= Hélène van Zuylen =

French socialite, author, auto racing pioneer

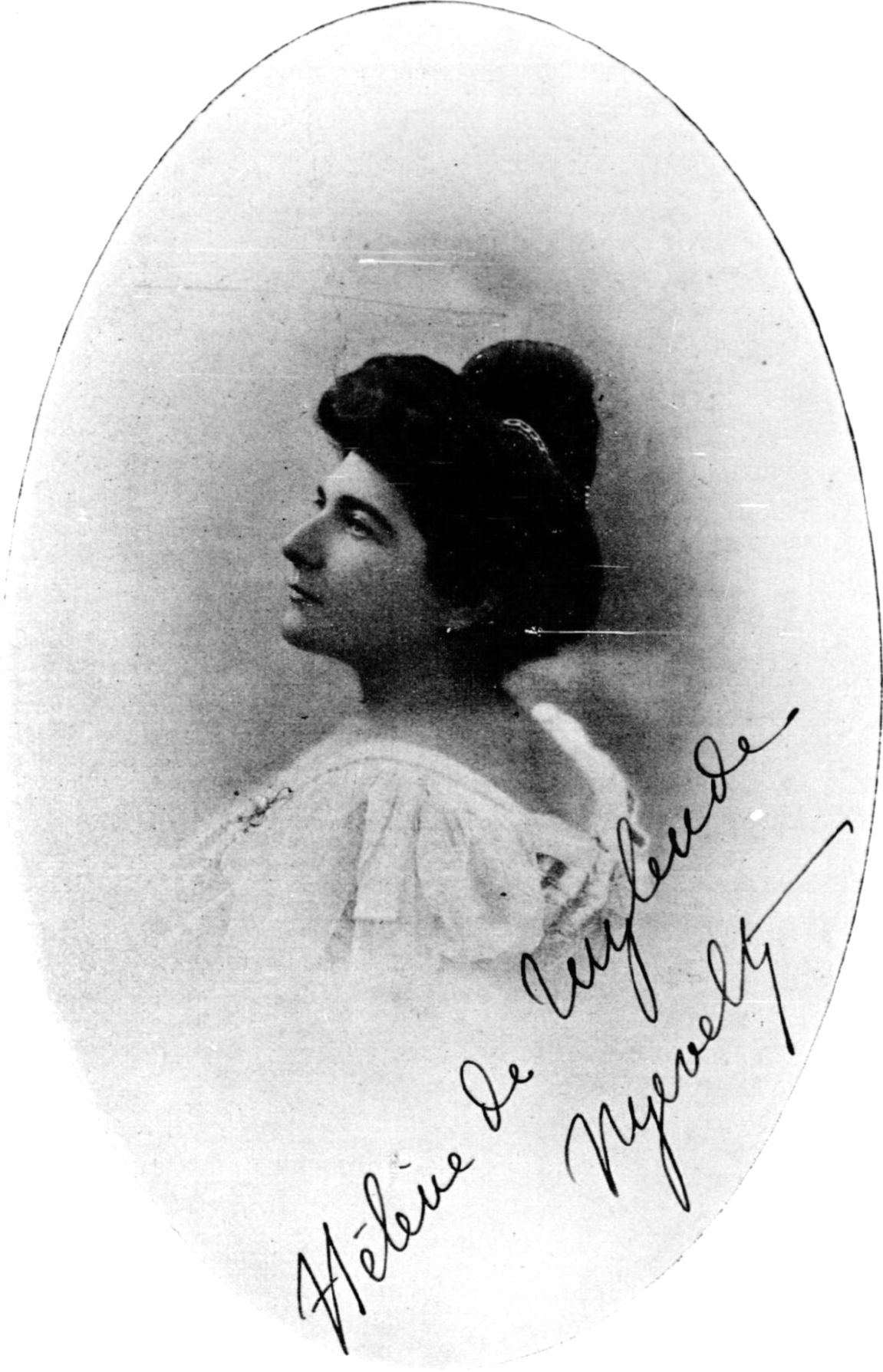
- Nouvelle Revue internationale illustrée, December 1908
- Born: Hélène Betty Louise Caroline de Rothschild; 21 August 1863; Paris, France
- Died: 17 October 1947 (aged 84); Lisbon, Portugal
- Other names: La Brioche, Paule Riversdale; Snail
- Occupation: author
- Known for: Poetry, plays and stories First woman to compete in an international motor race
- Title: Baroness
- Parent(s): Salomon James de Rothschild (father); Adèle von Rothschild (mother)

Baroness Hélène van Zuylen van Nijevelt van de Haar or Hélène de Zuylen de Nyevelt de Haar, née de Rothschild (21 August 1863 – 17 October 1947) was a French author and a member of the prominent Rothschild banking family. She collaborated on stories and poems with her lesbian partner Renée Vivien, sometimes under the pen name Paule Riversdale. An only child, the daughter of Salomon James de Rothschild, she was disinherited by her mother for marrying a Catholic, Baron Etienne van Zuylen of the old Dutch noble family Van Zuylen van Nievelt.

Hélène was one of a trio of French female motoring pioneers of the Belle Epoque. She entered the 1898 Paris–Amsterdam–Paris Trail, thus becoming the first woman to compete in an international motor race.

== Personal life ==
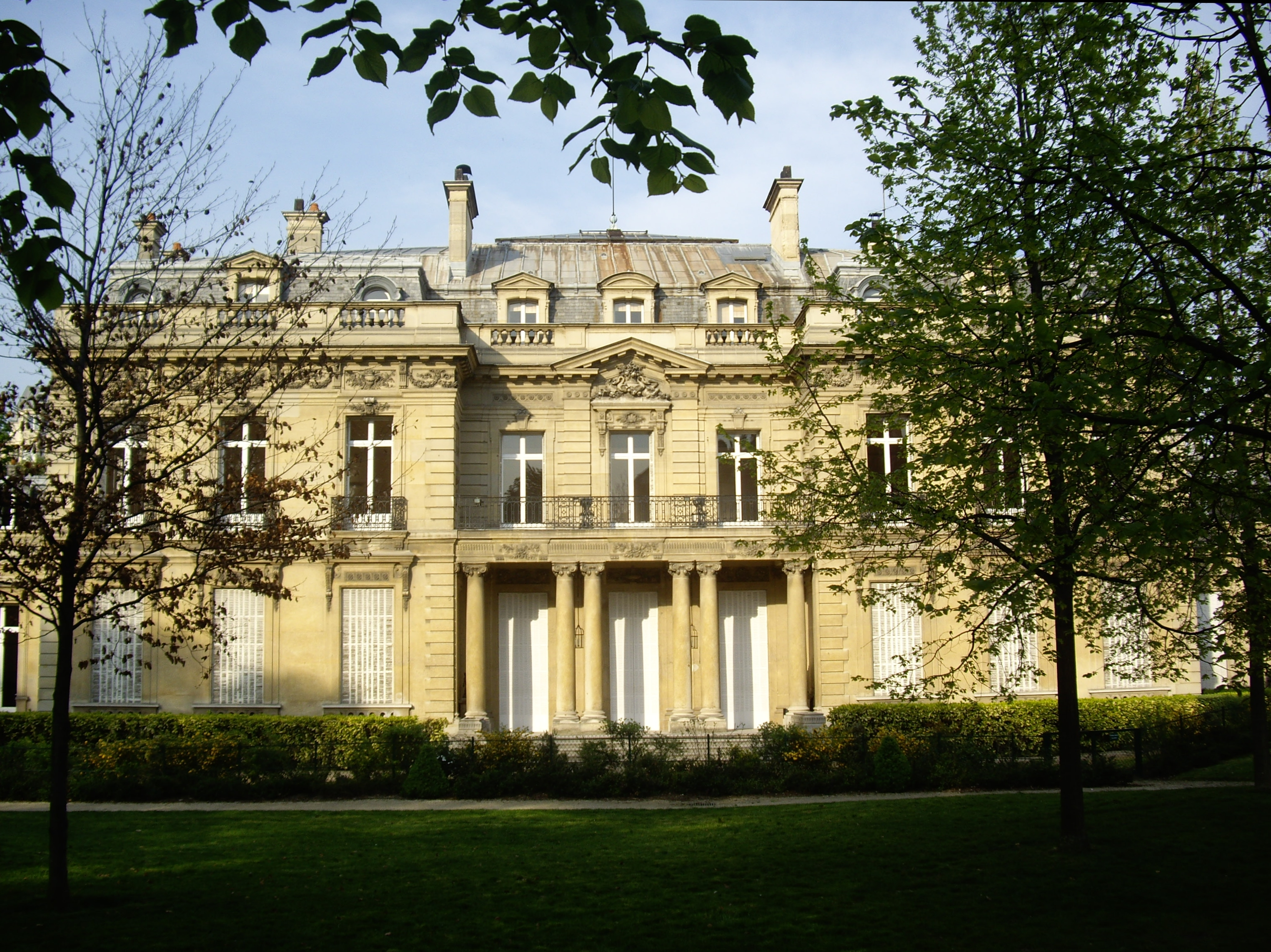
Hôtel Salomon de Rothschild, the childhood home of Hélène de Rothschild.

Hélène Betty Louise Caroline de Rothschild was the daughter of Baron Salomon James de Rothschild and Adèle von Rothschild (née Adele Hannah Charlotte de Rothschild) (the daughter of Salomon's German cousin Mayer Carl von Rothschild). She was raised at the Hôtel Salomon de Rothschild at 11. rue Berryer in the 8th arrondissement in the heart of Paris, near the Rue du Faubourg Saint-Honoré. Her mother bequeathed the property to the French government fine arts administration rather than to her only child, because Hélène was disinherited for marrying a Roman Catholic.

=== Relationships ===
On 16 August 1887 Hélène married the Roman Catholic Baron Etienne van Zuylen (1860–1934) of the House of Van Zuylen van Nievelt. They had two sons. Her son Baron Egmont van Zuylen van Nyevelt (1890–1960) was a diplomat and businessman and the father of Parisian socialite Marie-Hélène de Rothschild (born Baroness Marie-Hélène Naila Stephanie Josina van Zuylen van Nyevelt).

In 1901 Zuylen, a lesbian, met Renée Vivien to whom she provided much-needed emotional support and stability. Zuylen's social position did not allow for a public relationship, but she and Vivien often traveled together and continued a discreet affair for a number of years. Vivien's letters to her confidant, the French journalist and Classical scholar Jean Charles-Brun, reveal that she considered herself married to the Baroness. She may have published poetry and prose in collaboration with Zuylen under the pen name Paule Riversdale. The true attribution of these works is uncertain, however; some scholars believe they were written solely by Vivien. Even certain books published under Zuylen's name may be, in fact, Vivien's work. Most of Vivien's work is dedicated to "H.L.C.B.," the initials of Zuylen's first names.

In 1907 Zuylen abruptly left Vivien for another woman, which quickly fueled gossip within the lesbian coterie of Paris. Neither had been faithful.

On 23 July 1935 she founded the initial Renée Vivien Prize, an annual French literary prize awarded in honour of the poet she once loved, intended to give encouragement to women poets at the beginning of their career, along with a pecuniary endowment.

She was a member of the Automobile Club féminin de France.

== Nazi Occupation of France ==
Art from van Zuylen's collection was seized by the Reichsleiter Rosenberg Taskforce Nazi looting organisation during the occupation of France in World War II.

== Death ==
Baroness Hélène van Zuylen died in Lisbon, Portugal, on 17 October 1947.

== Writing ==
Hélène van Zuylen was a writer and between 1902 and 1914 she wrote poems, short stories, novels and three plays, many in collaboration with Renée Vivien:

Works published under the name of Paule Riversdale (Renée Vivien & Hélène de Zuylen de Nyevelt in collaboration):

- 1903 – Échos et Reflets (Echoes and Reflections) – Poetry. Cover by Lucien Lévy-Dhurmer.
- 1903 – Vers L'Amour (To Love) – Poetry.
- 1904 – L'Etre Double (The Double Being) – A novel on androgyny. Cover by Lucien Lévy-Dhurmer.
- 1904 – Netsuké – A Japanese-themed novel.

Works published under the name of Hélène de Zuylen de Nyevelt (attributed at least in part to Renée Vivien):

- 1904 – Effeuillements (Falling Leaves) – Poetry.
- 1905 – Copeaux (Chips) – A large volume of prose poems, stories and plays.
- 1905 – L'Impossible Sincérité (Impossible Sincerity)- A play.
- 1905 – Comédie dans un Jardin (Comedy in a Garden) – A one-act play performed at the 'Théâtre de l'Automobile Club de France', 11 décembre 1905.
- 1907 – Le Chemin du Souvenir (The Path of Memory) – A play.
- 1910 – L'Inoublée (The Unforgotten) – A series of short stories in tribute to Renée Vivien. 'Night's Dream', 'The Image inviolate', 'Public Gardens', 'The Two Irises', 'Someone came', 'The Adventurous', 'The Eternal Siren', 'The Garden of Mr Dubois', 'Confidences of flowers', 'Death in the mirror', 'I will give my eyes to the woman I love'.

Works published under the name of Hélène de Zuylen de Nyevelt (believed to be her work alone):

- 1906 – La Mascarade Interrompue (The Interrupted Mascarade) – A play.
- 1908 – Béryl – A play in 4 acts which furthers the intrigues of 'L'Impossible Sincérité'.
- 1912 – La Dernière étreinte (The Last Embrace) – A novel.
- 1914 – L'Enjoleuse (The Coaxer) – A novel.

== Motoring ==
Together with Camille du Gast and Duchesse d'Uzès Anne de Rochechouart de Mortemart, (Note: Duchesse d'Uzès Anne de Rochechouart de Mortemart was the first woman, along with Camille du Gast, to hold a driving license in 1897, the first woman to be ticketed for speeding in 1898 (15 km/h instead of 12 km/h), and the first woman 'lieutenant de louveterie' (Wolfcatcher Royal) in 1923.) Baroness Hélène van Zuylen was one of a trio of French female motoring pioneers of the Belle Epoque. She entered the 1898 Paris–Amsterdam–Paris Trail using the pseudonym Snail, thus becoming the first woman to compete in an international motor race.

Baron Etienne van Zuylen, her Dutch husband, was the President of the Automobile Club de France (A.C.F.), the main organiser of the 1898 Paris–Amsterdam–Paris Trail. Using the pseudonym Snail, Baroness van Zuylen successfully completed the Trail, thus becoming the first woman to compete in an international motor race. The Trail was run between 7–13 July over 1431 km and won by Fernand Charron driving a Panhard-Levassor in a time of 33:04:34. In retrospect it is sometimes referred to as the III Grand Prix de l'ACF.

In 1901 van Zuylen entered the Paris-Berlin race but was stopped by technical failure on the first day. The only other female entrant among the 122 starters was Camille du Gast, who successfully completed the event, climbing from starting last to finishing 33rd.

She was nicknamed La Brioche, and used the pseudonym Snail for motor racing whilst her husband, Baron Etienne van Zuylen, competed as Escargot (French for snail).

== Kasteel de Haar ==
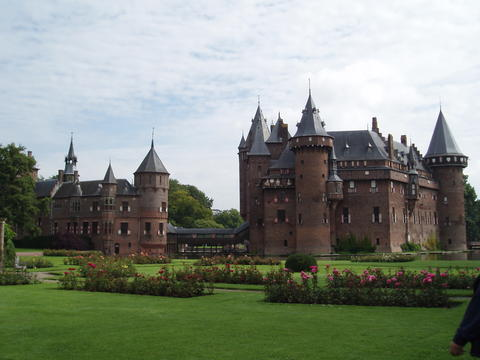
Kasteel de Haar

On her marriage to Baron Etienne van Zuylen the Kasteel de Haar, located near Haarzuilens in the province of Utrecht in the Netherlands, became her official residence. Originally belonging to the de Haar family, the castle passed to the van Zuylen family in 1440 when the last male de Haar heir died childless. The castle fell into disrepair and ruin until the baroness used her Rothschild family money to fully rebuild it in neo-Gothic style. The current buildings, except for the chapel, date from 1892 and are the work of Dutch architect P.J.H. Cuypers. Her extensive refurbishments turned it into one of the foremost Gothic Revival castles in the Netherlands.

== See also ==
- Slot Zuylen
- Renée Vivien Prize
- Online Dictionary of Dutch Women
