= Van Zuylen van Nievelt =

Dutch noble family

van Zuylen van Nijevelt
- noble family
- Coat of Arms
- Country: Netherlands; Belgium
- Founded: 13th century
- Founder: Steven van Zuylen
- Titles: baron

Van Zuylen van Nievelt (Dutch pronunciation: [vɑn ˈzœylə(ɱ) vɑ ˈnivɛlt]) is an old noble Dutch family originating from Utrecht.

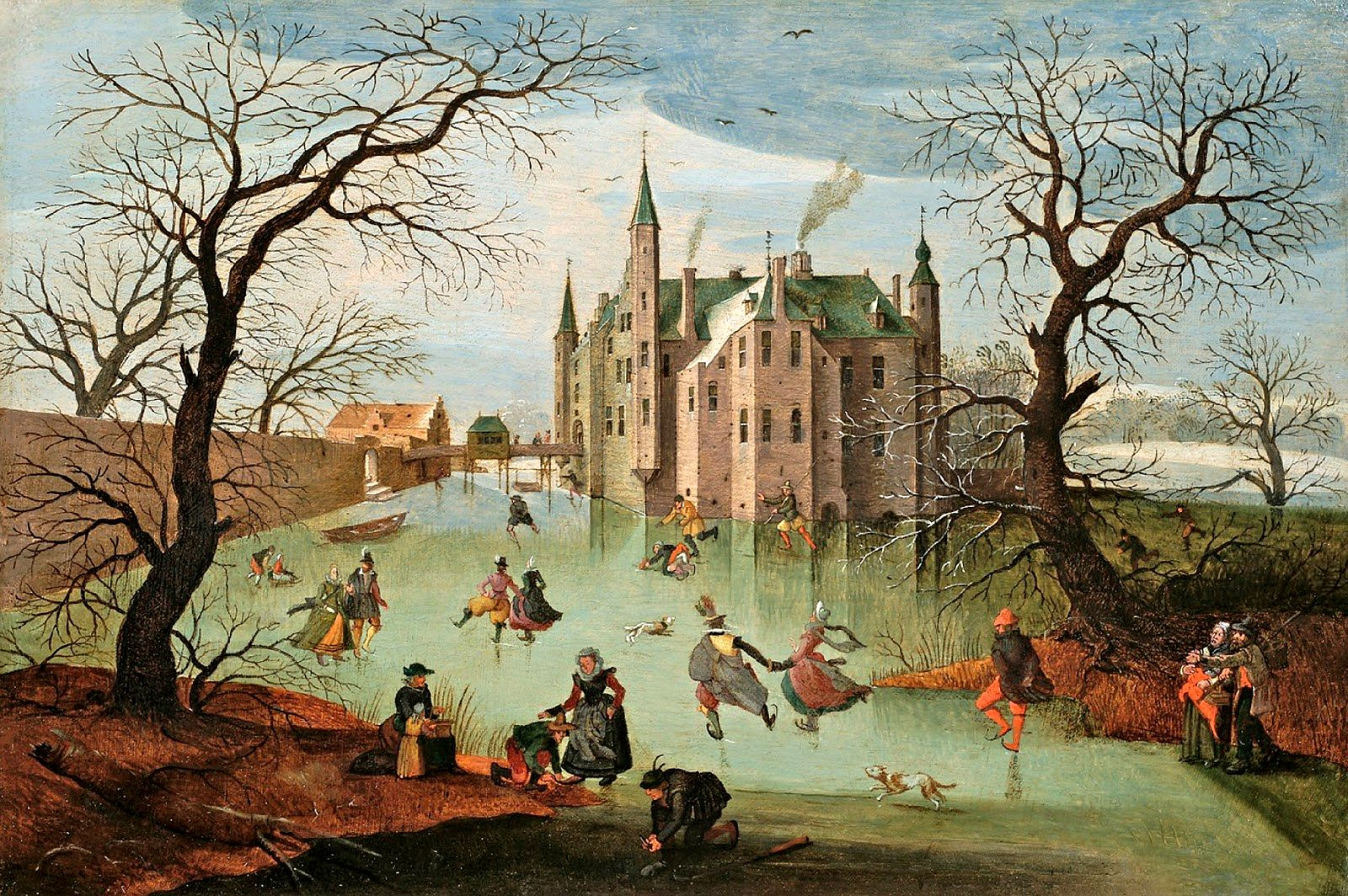
Castle Zuylen, by artist Abel Grimmer

== History ==
=== Utrecht ===
The family was already noble from earliest times ("Uradel"). The first known ancestor is the knight Steven van Zulen, who early in the 13th century settled in Utrecht. His descendants married into leading families and built the castle called Zuylen. They later joined Nievelt to their family name, being the name of an estate and castle Nijeveld ("new field") they had acquired. Their main fortune was a result of their activities in impoldering morasses.

From the 19th century to the present, the name of the family was written as Van Zuylen van Nievelt. Members received recognition of nobility in 1814 and the title of baron was confirmed in 1822. Several members of the family lived in Barneveld where they built a castle named Schaffelaar. The Dutch branch of the family became extinct in 1947.

A family Van Zuylen van Nijevelt, originating from Rotterdam, must not be confused with this family.

=== Belgium ===
In the 17th century, Pieter-Frederic van Zuylen (1604–1691) was the first of the family to settle in the catholic southern parts of the Netherlands, nowadays Belgium.. He was an officer in the Spanish army and married Olympio Sindico and Gertrude van Voorst. This Belgian branch continues under the name van Zuylen van Nyevelt and has many members, until today.

== Genealogy ==
=== Early generations ===
The existing genealogy must, certainly for the first generations, be approached with circumspection, being somewhat problematic regarding the chronology of the succeeding generations:

- Steven van Zuylen (around 1200), lord of Zuylen-Anholt
  - Steven van Zuylen (around 1230)
    - Frederic van Zuylen van Vecht (†Battle of Soesterenge 1282)
      - Steven van Zuylen m. Bertha van Dale
        - Jacob van Zuylen van Vecht (-1355) m. Christina Uten Ham
          - Steven van Zuylen van Nyevelt m. Agnes van Heemskerck
            - Willem van Zuylen (-1430) m. Beatrix van Amstel van Mijnden
              - Frederic van Zuylen (around 1460) m. Diderica van Maerssen
                - Steven van Zuylen (1440–1529) m. Heylwig van Acquoy
                  - Frederic van Zuylen (born 1485) m. Lucia van Buchel (-1564)
                    - Steven van Zuylen (1530–1596) m. Cornelia van Oostrum (-1563)
                      - Willem van Zuylen van Nyevelt, lord of Snaefburg (†Utrecht 1639) m. Maria van de Vijvere (-1623)
                        - Pieter-Frederic van Zuylen van Nyevelt (Maarssen 1604–1691), married in Brussels with Olympia Sindico (†1634) and a second time in Utrecht with Gertrude van Voorst. He was an officer in the Spanish army.

=== Notable members of the family Van Zuylen van Nievelt ===
- Hendrik van Zuylen van Nijevelt (c. 1440 – 1483), general.
- Willem van Zuylen van Nijevelt (died 1543), Dutch writer.

Genealogy of the last name bearers:

- Jasper Hendrik van Zuylen van Nievelt (1751–1828), lord of Glindhorst, den Brieller and Schaffelaar, mayor of Barneveld, MP for Gelderland.
  - Gerrit Willem van Zuylen van Nievelt, lord van Dorth 1787- (1756–1813).
    - Coenraad Jan van Zuylen van Nievelt, lord of Glinthorst and den Brieller (1779–1837).
      - Gerrit Willem baron van Zuylen van Nievelt (1807–1881), member of the provincial government of Gelderland, mayor of Barneveld 1837 to 1841.
        - Louise Marie Clemence baroness van Zuylen van Nievelt (1858–1947), last of her name, married with mr. Alexander Adriaan baron van Nagell (1859–1921), brother of A.W.J.J. baron van Nagell (1851–1936)
      - Jasper Hendrik van Zuylen van Nievelt (1808–1877), lord of Schaffelaar, member of the provincial government of Gelderland.
        - Johanna Magdalena Cornelia van Zuylen van Nievelt, (1856–1934), married with Anne Willem Jacob Joost baron van Nagell (1851–1936), mayor of Barneveld
      - Theodoor Willem van Zuylen van Nievelt (1813–1881), political personality

=== Van Zuylen van Nyevelt in Belgium ===
- Pieter-Andries van Zuylen (Oudenaarde 1649 - Bruges 1708), a son out of the first marriage of Pieter-Frederic, became the ancestor of the Catholic van Zuylens. He was first an officer in the Spanish army and then in the service of prince Eugène de Tour et Taxis. He was appointed by him as postmaster general for Bruges and its surrounding province. He married Caroline Le Febure (1658–1723).
  - Their son, Jacques-Rodolphe van Zuylen van Nyevelt (Bruges 1691–1752) was also general postmaster. He married Marie-Anne van Steelant (1693–1722) and they had seven children. Amongst them:
    - Jacques-Antoine van Zuylen van Nyevelt de Gaesebeke (Bruges 1719–1779) married with Claire de la Coste (1724–1804). His descendants omitted to ask for confirmation of their noble status, after 1814.
    - Jean-Bernard van Zuylen van Nyevelt (1721–1791), postmaster general, married with Isabelle du Bois (1730–1804). They are the ancestors of all van Zuylen van Nyevelts in the Southern Netherlands, later Belgium.

=== Confirmation of nobility ===
Under the United of Kingdom of the Netherlands several children of Jean-Bernard asked for confirmation of their noble status and of their title of baron. This was granted as follows:

- 1816: Jean-Jacques van Zuylen van Nyevelt van de Haar (he had inherited the estate of de Haar, from a childless member of the Dutch van Zuylens).
- 1827: Jean-Baptiste van Zuylen van Nyevelt (1755–1837)
- 1827: Marie-Dominique van Zuylen van Nyevelt (1769–1846)
- 1828: the sons of Joseph van Zuylen van Nyevelt (1761–1824): Jean-Joseph (1802–1883), Guy (1809–1852), the godfather of Guido Gezelle and Frederic (1814–1881).
- 1855: the sons of André-Patrice van Zuylen van Nyevelt (1772–1849): Jean-Jacques (1801–1875) and André (1805–1882).

Of the eight sons of Jean-Bernard van Zuylen, only Jean-Jacques (who had thirteen children) has male descendants up to this day. The eldest branch inherited the De Haar estate near Utrecht. They are the branch known as van Zuylen van Nijevelt van de Haar. The last male heir died in 2011.

One of the sons of Jean-Bernard, François van Zuylen van Nyevelt (1764–1835) was accepted within the Bavarian nobility and married Countess Octavia von Jenison-Walworth (a daughter of Count Francis Jenison). This branch became extinct for the males in 1906 with the death of François-Ghislain van Zuylen van Nyevelt (1836–1906) and in 1953 the last female member of the family died, Linda van Zuylen van Nyevelt (1874–1953).

=== Notable members of the Belgian family Van Zuylen van Nyevelt ===
- Jean-Jacques van Zuylen van Nyevelt van de Haar (1752–1846), MP, mayor of Bruges.
  - Gustave van Zuylen van Nyevelt van de Haar (1818–1890), diplomat, married Julie Visart de Bocarmé (1823–1862) and baroness Leontine van Lockhorst (1830–1906)
    - Étienne van Zuylen van Nyevelt van de Haar (1860–1934), was able to restore thoroughly the De Haar estate, with the financial support of his wife Hélène de Rothschild (1863–1947). He founded the Automobile Club de France.
      - Egmont van Zuylen van Nyevelt van de Haar (1890–1960), diplomat. He was married with the Egyptian Marguerite Namétalla (1901–1996)
        - Marie-Hélène van Zuylen van Nijevelt van de Haar (1927–1996), a society personality and maecenas was married with François de Nicolay (1919–1963) and with baron Guy de Rothschild (1909–2007)
        - Sybil van Zuylen van Nyevelt van de Haar (1929–1939)
        - Thierry van Zuylen van Nyevelt van de Haar (1932–2011), last lord of the castle De Haar at Haarzuilens and last male descendant of the branch van Zuylen van Nyevelt van de Haar
  - Hector van Zuylen van Nyevelt (1833–1915)
    - Albert van Zuylen van Nyevelt (1870–1936), historian and keeper of the public records.

== Gallery ==
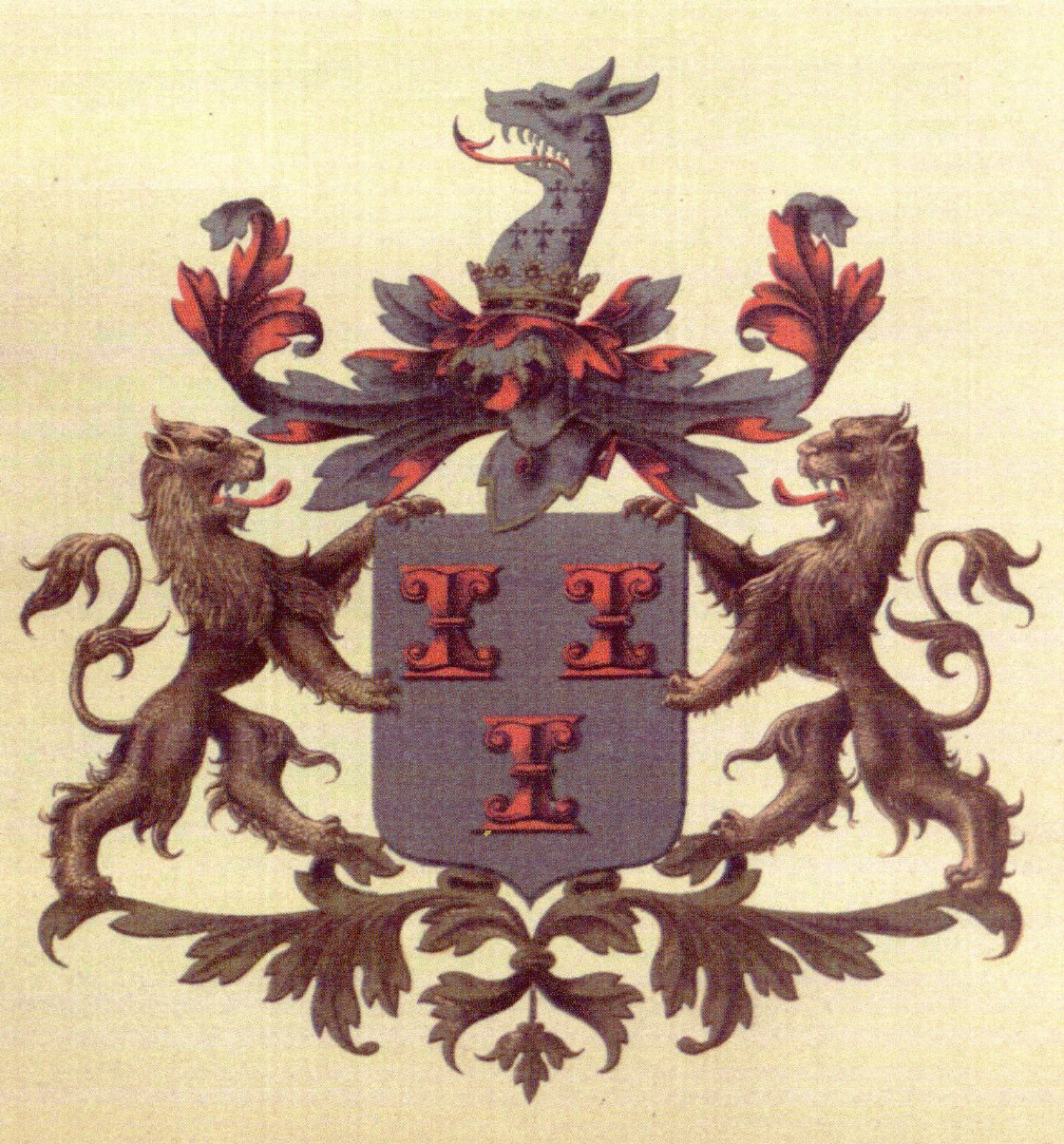
Zuylen arms

Zuylen arms in the medieval Gelre Armorial.

== Literature ==
- H. Obreen, La maison de Zuylen dans l'histoire des Pays-Bas, (Tongerloo, 1933).
- J. Gailliard, Maison de Zuylen, histoire et généographie, (Bruges, 1863).
- Nederland's Adelsboek 25 (1927); 46 (1953), p. 547-557 (met stamreeks).
- Louis van Renynghe de Voxvrie, Descendance de Jean-Bernard van Zuylen van Nyevelt et d'Isabelle du Bois, Brugge, 1964.
- Luc Duerloo & Paul Janssens, Wapenboek van de Belgische adel, Brussel, 1992
- Genealogisches Handbuch des Adels 120 (1999), p. 580-581.
- Oscar Coomans de Brachène, Etat Présent de la Noblesse Belge, Annuaire 2002, Brussel, 2002, p. 35-56.
