= De Haar Castle =

Castle in Utrecht, Netherlands

Castle De Haar
- Kasteel de Haar
- Haarzuilens, Utrecht, Netherlands
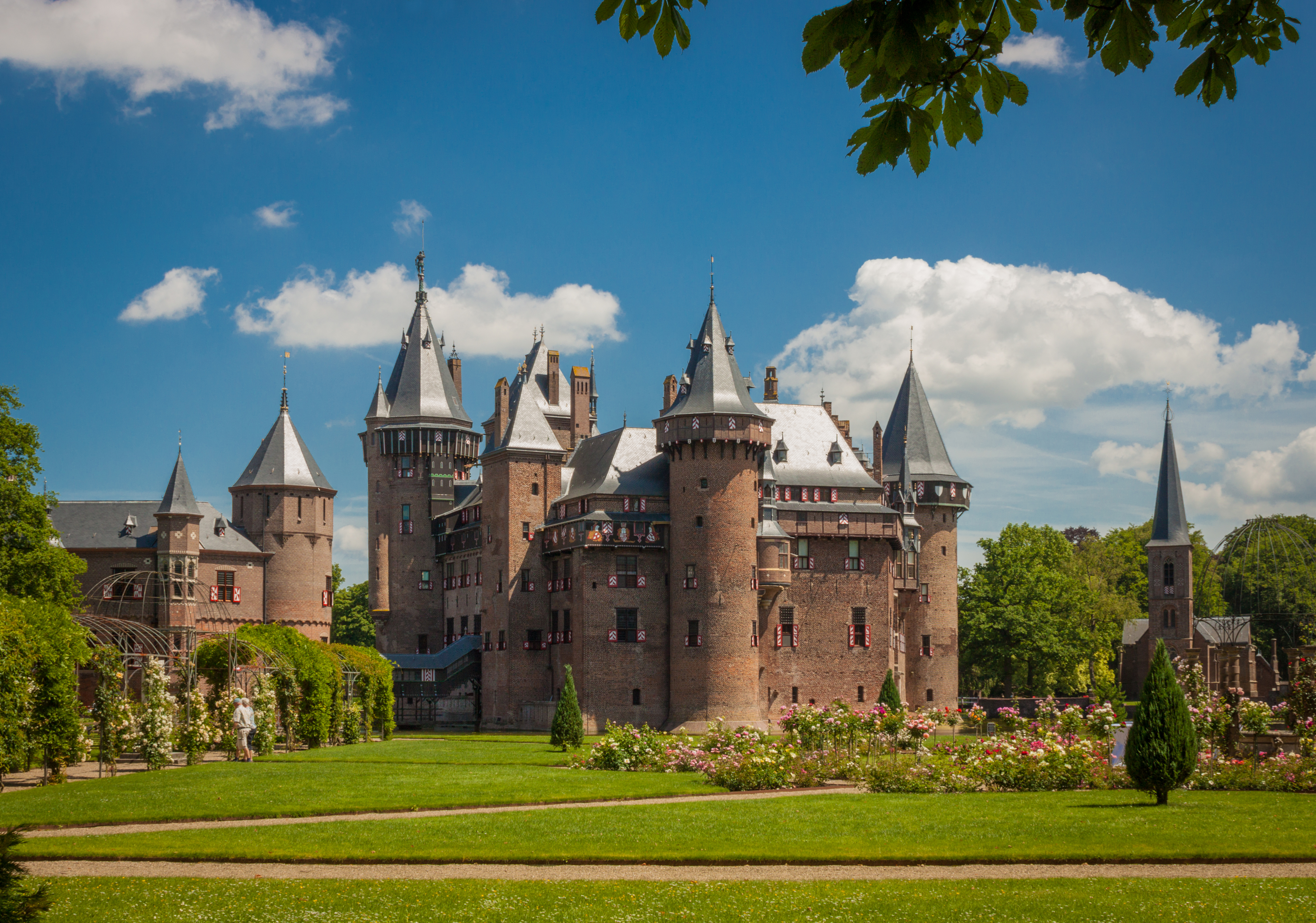
- De Haar

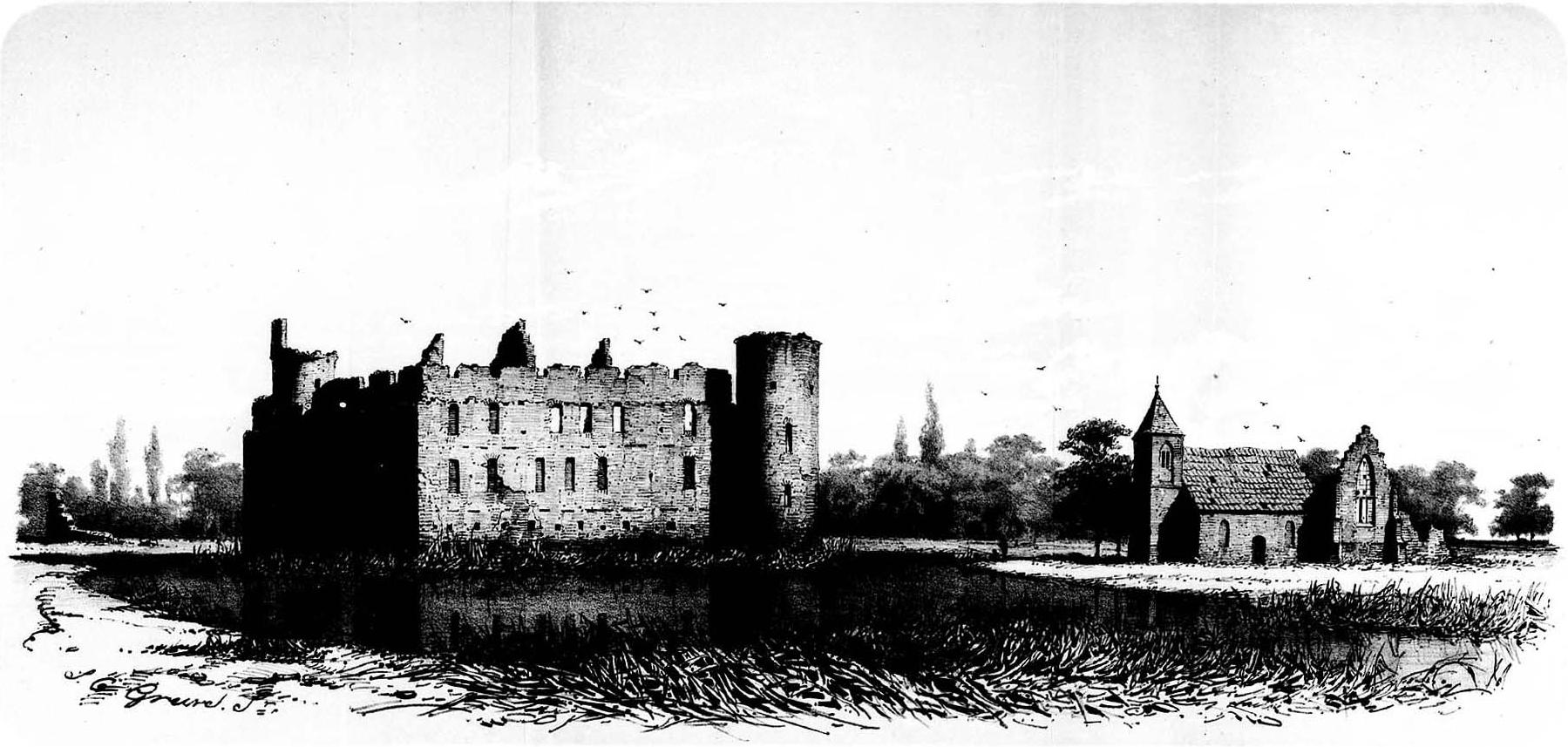
- Before restoration (1862)

Site information
- Type: Castle
- Owner: Foundation Kasteel de Haar
- Open to the public: Yes
- Condition: Good

Location
- Location in the Netherlands
- Coordinates: 52°07′17″N 4°59′11″E

Site history
- Built: 1892-1907
- Built by: P. J. H. Cuypers

De Haar Castle (Dutch: Kasteel de Haar) is located outside Utrecht, Netherlands. It is the largest castle in The Netherlands.

== Original site ==
The oldest historical record of a building at the location of the current castle dates to 1391. In that year, the De Haar family received the castle and the surrounding lands as a fiefdom from Hendrik van Woerden. The castle remained in the ownership of the De Haar family until 1440, when the last male heir died childless. The castle then passed to the Van Zuylen family. In 1482, the castle was burned down and the walls were destroyed, except for the parts that did not have a military function. These parts probably were incorporated into the castle when it was rebuilt during the early 16th century. The castle is mentioned in an inventory of the possessions of Steven van Zuylen from 1506, and again in a list of fiefdoms in the province Utrecht from 1536. The oldest image of the castle dates to 1554 and shows that the castle had been largely rebuilt by then. After 1641, when Johan van Zuylen van de Haar died childless, the castle seems to have gradually fallen into ruins. The castle escaped total destruction by the French during the Rampjaar 1672.

In 1801 the last Catholic van Zuylen in the Netherlands, the bachelor Anton-Martinus van Zuylen van Nijevelt (1708–1801), bequeathed the property to his cousin Jean-Jacques van Zuylen van Nyevelt (1752–1846) of the Catholic branch in the Southern Netherlands.

== 1892 restoration ==
In 1887, Jean-Jacques' grandson, Etienne Gustave Frédéric Baron van Zuylen van Nyevelt van de Haar (1860–1934), married Baroness Hélène de Rothschild, of the Rothschild family. When Etienne inherited the ruined castle in 1890 from his grandfather, the couple set about rebuilding the castle, fully financed by Hélène's family. For the restoration of the castle, they contracted famous architect Pierre Cuypers. He would work on this project for 20 years (from 1892 to 1912). The castle has 200 rooms and 30 bathrooms, of which only a small number on the ground and first floor have been opened to be viewed by the public. Cuypers placed a statue of himself in a corner of the gallery on the first floor.

The castle was equipped by Cuypers with the most modern gadgets, such as electrical lighting with its own generator, and central heating by way of steam. This installation is internationally recognized as an industrial monument. The kitchen was for that period also very modern and still has its copper pots and pans, the largest extant set in the Netherlands, and an enormous furnace approximately 6 metres long, which was heated with peat or coals. The tiles in the kitchen are decorated with the coats of arms of the families De Haar and Van Zuylen, which were for this purpose especially baked in Franeker. Cuypers emphasized the difference between the old and new walls by using different kinds of bricks. For the interior Cuypers made extensive use of cast iron.

Many details in the castle refer to the Rothschild family, such as the Stars of David on the balconies of the knight's hall and the coat of arms of the family right underneath on the hearth in the library. The coat of arms of the Van Zuylen family are omnipresent. Their motto is on the hearth in the knight's hall (A majoribus et virtute).

Despite many attempts by the Nazi to seize the castle on the grounds that the owners were Jewish, the attempts failed due to actions taken by the property's steward, Hendrik de Greef.

== Interior ==
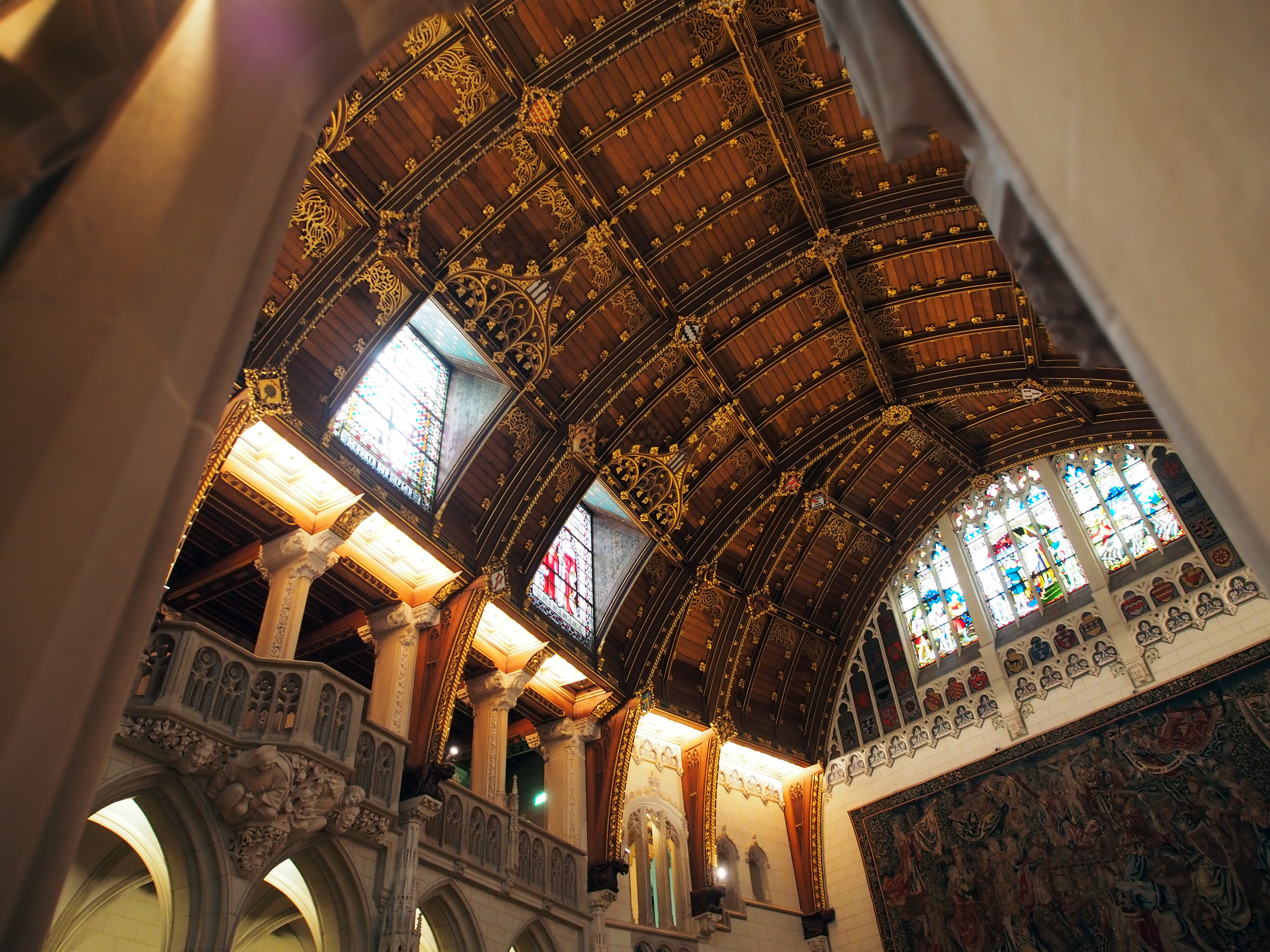
Interior of the main hall

The interior of the castle is decorated with richly ornamented woodcarving, reminiscent of the interior of a Roman Catholic church. This carving was made in the workshop of Cuypers in Roermond, who even designed the tableware. The interior is furnished with many works from the Rothschild collections, including beautiful old porcelain from Japan and China, and several old Flemish tapestries and paintings with religious illustrations. The centrepiece is a carrier coach of the wife of a Japanese shōgun, which reportedly is only one of two worldwide, the other one being exhibit in Tokyo. Japanese tourists come to De Haar to admire this coach, which was donated from the Rothschilds' collections.

== Park and gardens ==
Surrounding the castle there is a park, designed by Hendrik Copijn, for which Van Zuylen ordered 7,000 grown trees. Because these could not be transported through the city of Utrecht, Van Zuylen bought a house and demolished it. The park contains many waterworks and a formal garden reminiscent of the French gardens of Versailles. During the Second World War many of the gardens were lost, because the wood was used to light fires, and the soil was used to grow vegetables. Today most are restored to their original state.

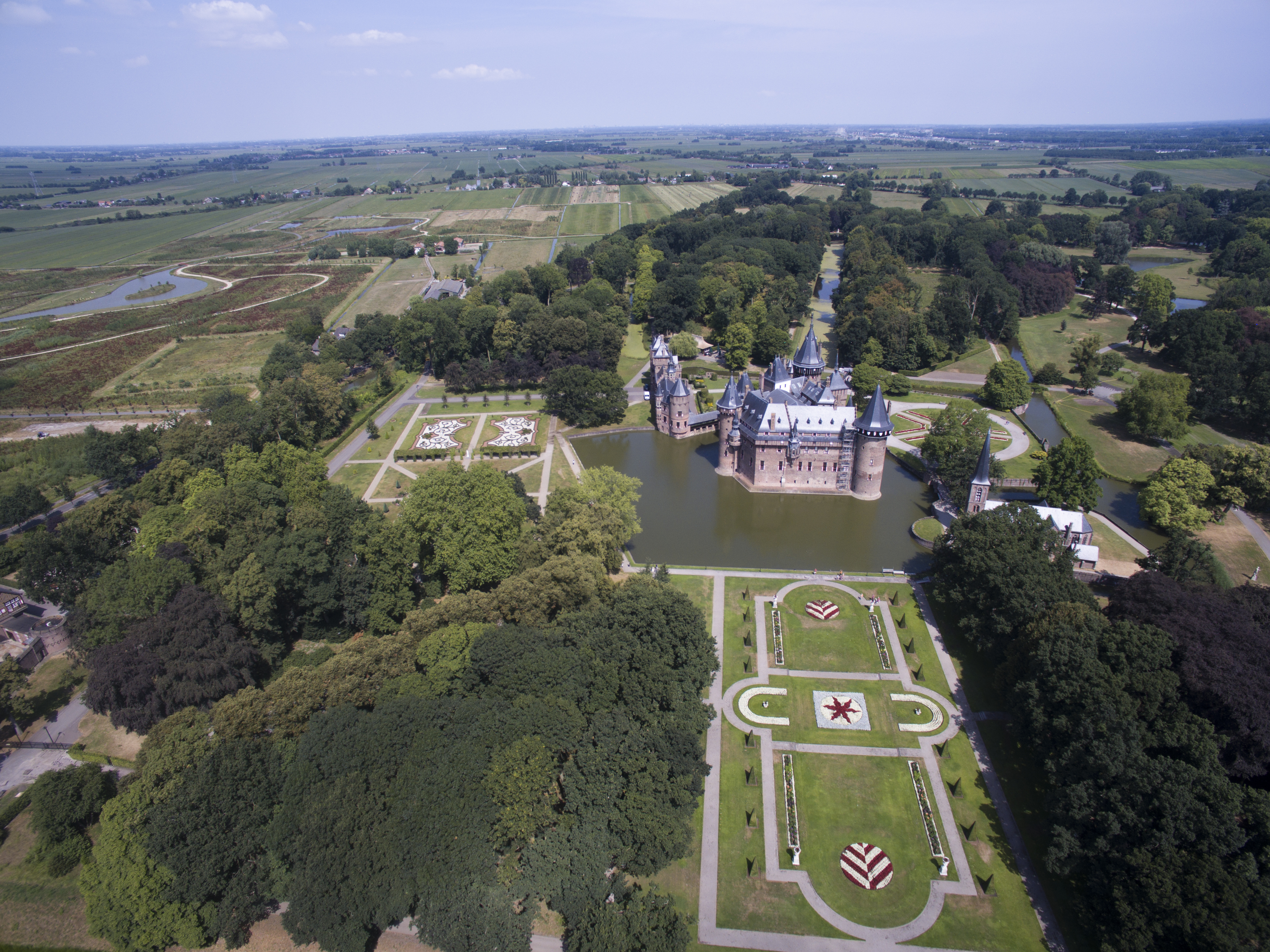
The castle seen from the air

For the decoration of the park, the village Haarzuilens, except for the town church, was demolished. The inhabitants were moved to a place a kilometre away, where a new Haarzuilens arose and where they lived as tenants of the lord of the castle. This new village was also built in a pseudo-medieval style, including a rural village green. The buildings were for the most part designed by Cuypers and his son Joseph Cuypers. Since 2000, the estate is partly owned by Natuurmonumenten.

== Arms ==
The colours of the family van Zuylen are red and white. The coat of arms consists of three red columns on a white field. The different branches of this family differ slightly on these colours. This coat of arms does not only live on in the colours of the castle, but also in nearly all of the houses of Haarzuilens, even in the newly constructed ones.

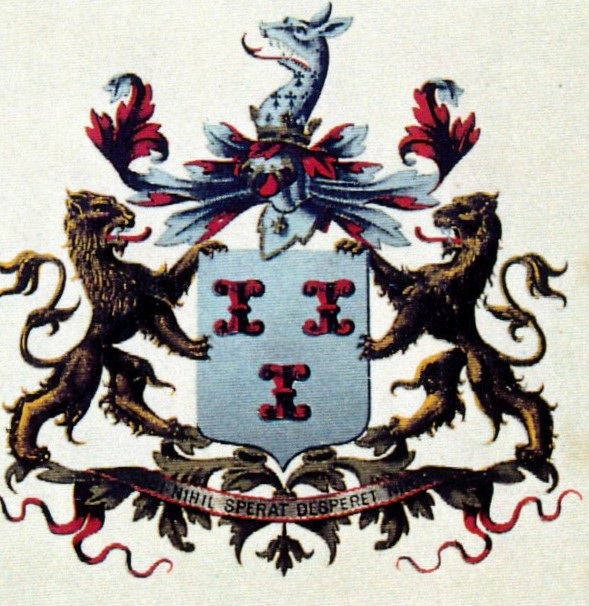
Arms of the Zuylen family

Coat of arms of Zuylen

Two versions of van Zuylen arms

== Current ownership ==
In 2000, the family Van Zuylen van Nyevelt passed ownership of the castle and the gardens (45 ha) to the foundation Kasteel de Haar. However, the family retained the right to spend one month per year in the castle. In the same year, the Dutch society Natuurmonumenten bought the surrounding estate of 400 ha. An extensive restoration programme of the castle and the gardens was initiated in 2001 and was completed in 2011.

After the death in 2011 of the last male heir, Thierry van Zuylen, his five daughters also sold the castle's art collection and furnishings to the new owners.

== Fairs ==
The castle terrain is regularly used for fairs and markets, such as the Elf Fantasy Fair.

== Gallery ==
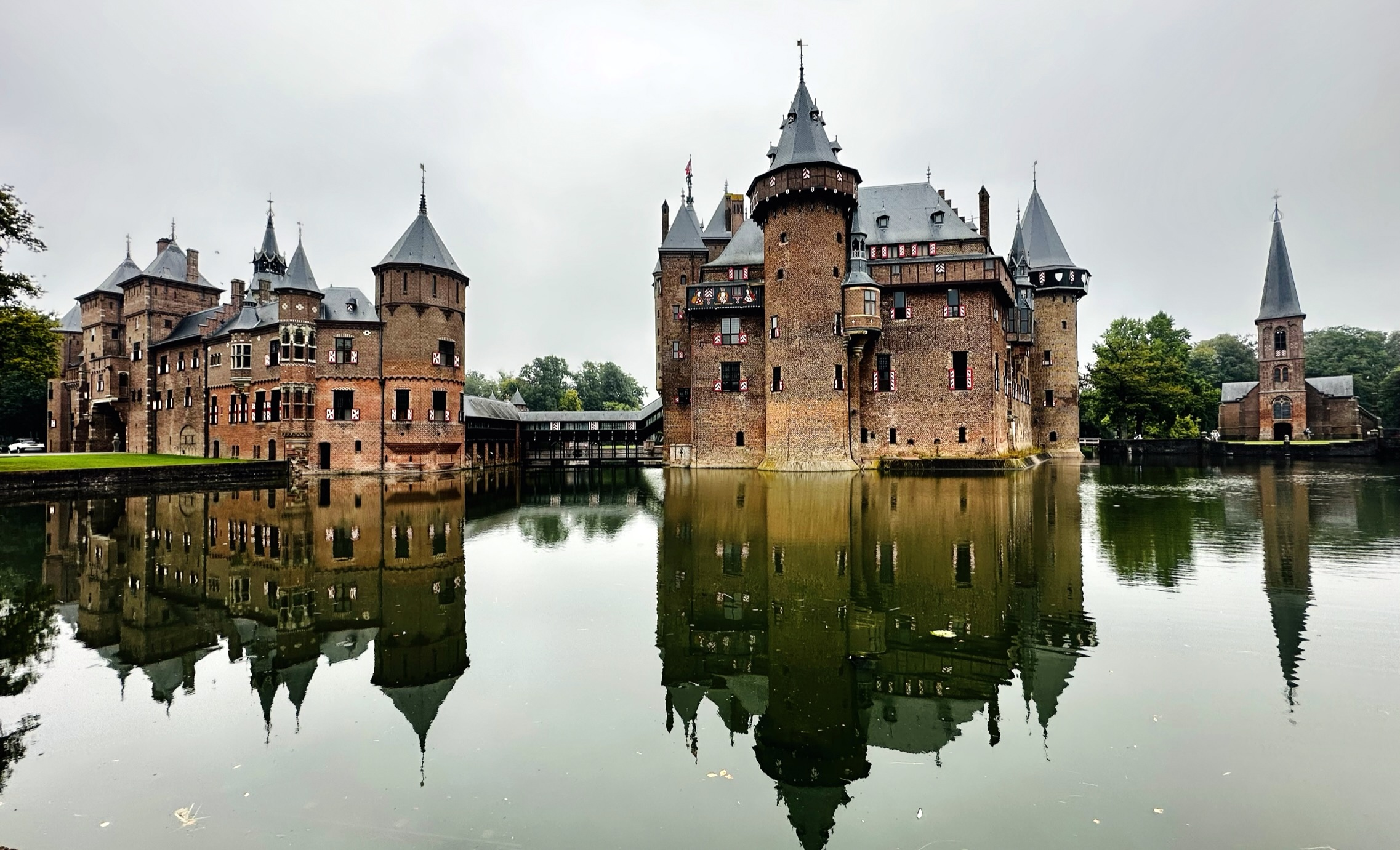
De Haar Castle

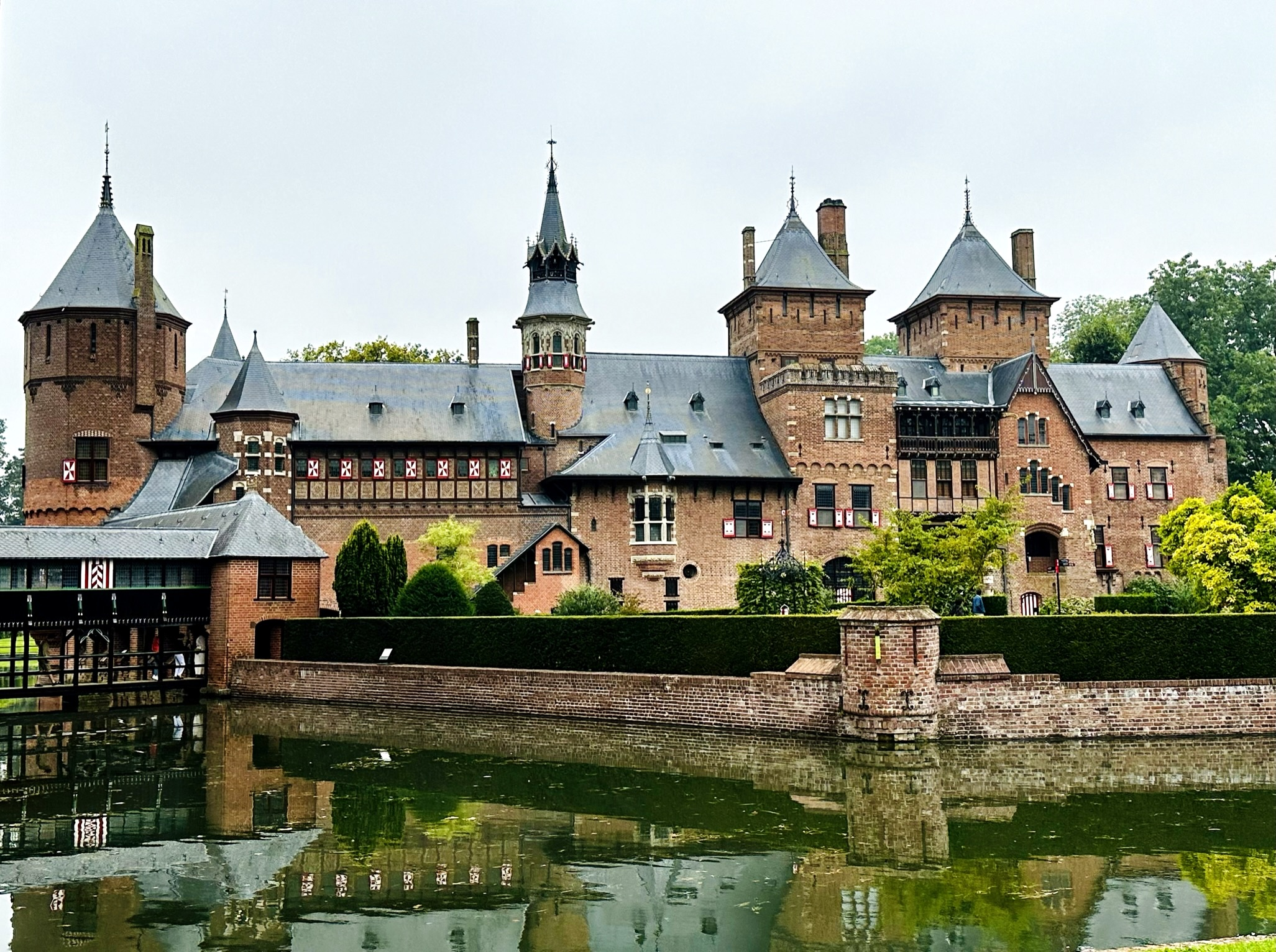
Châtelet rear view

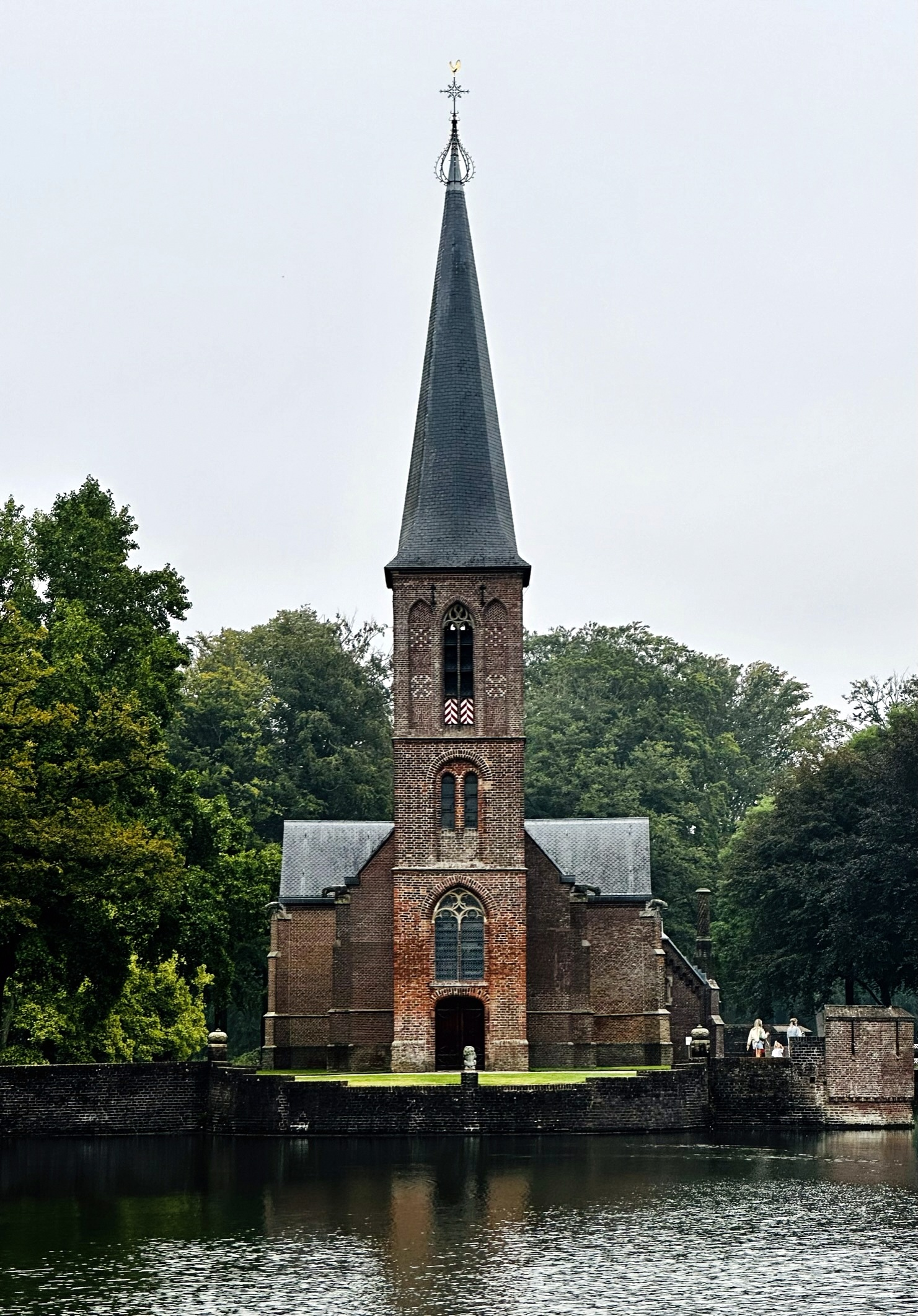
The castle's chapel

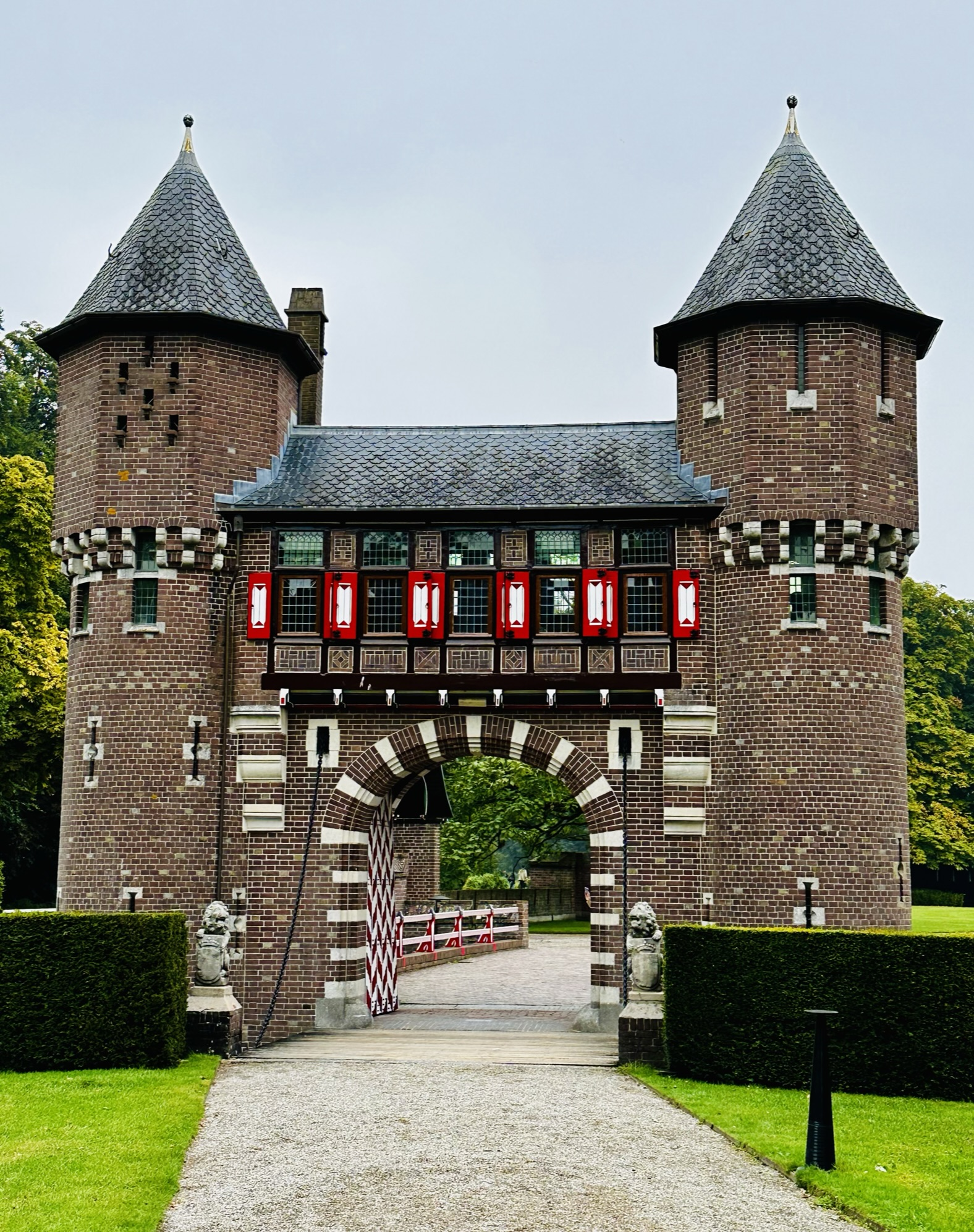
One of many gates and bridges on the property

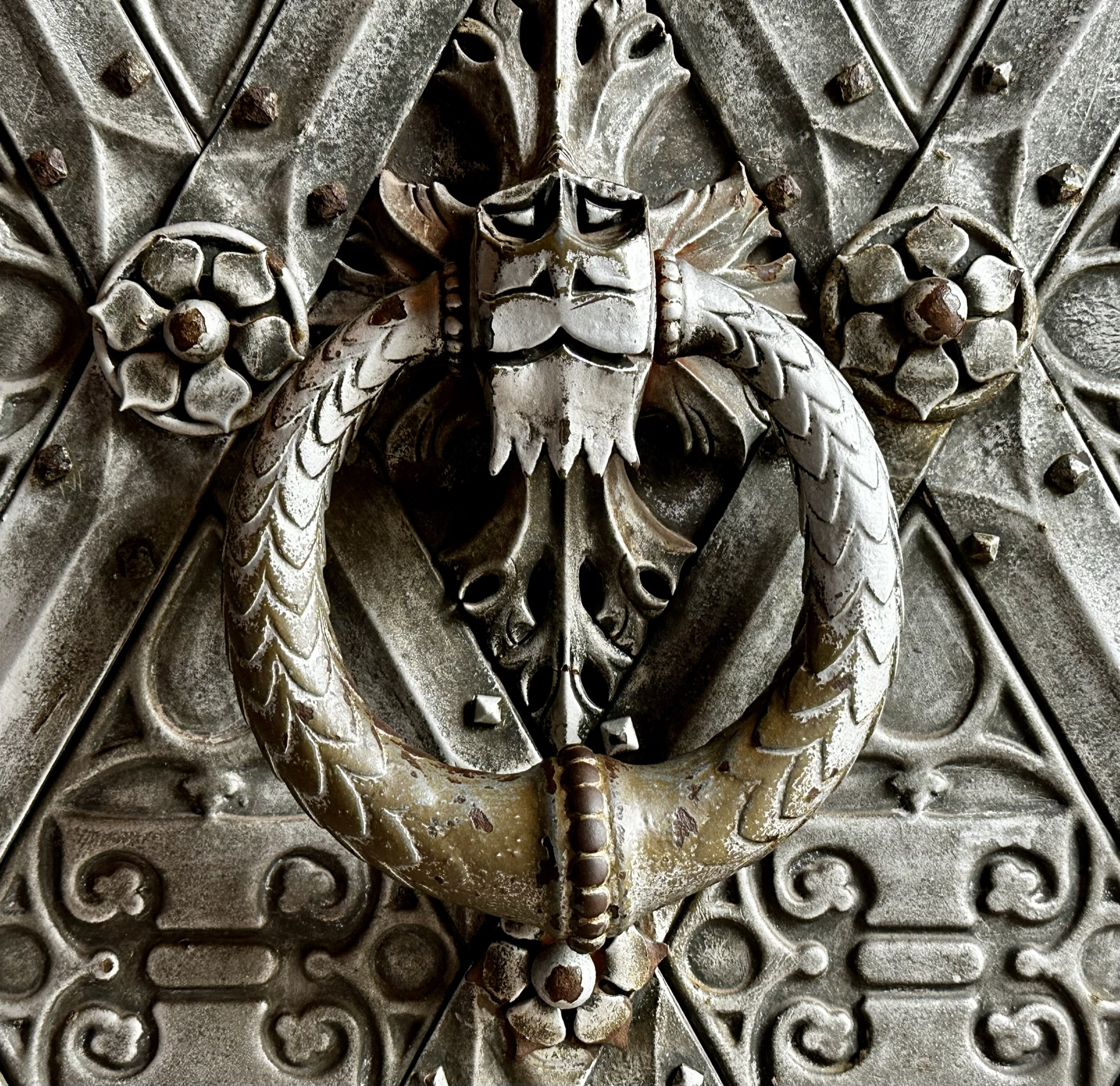
Door knocker to the main building

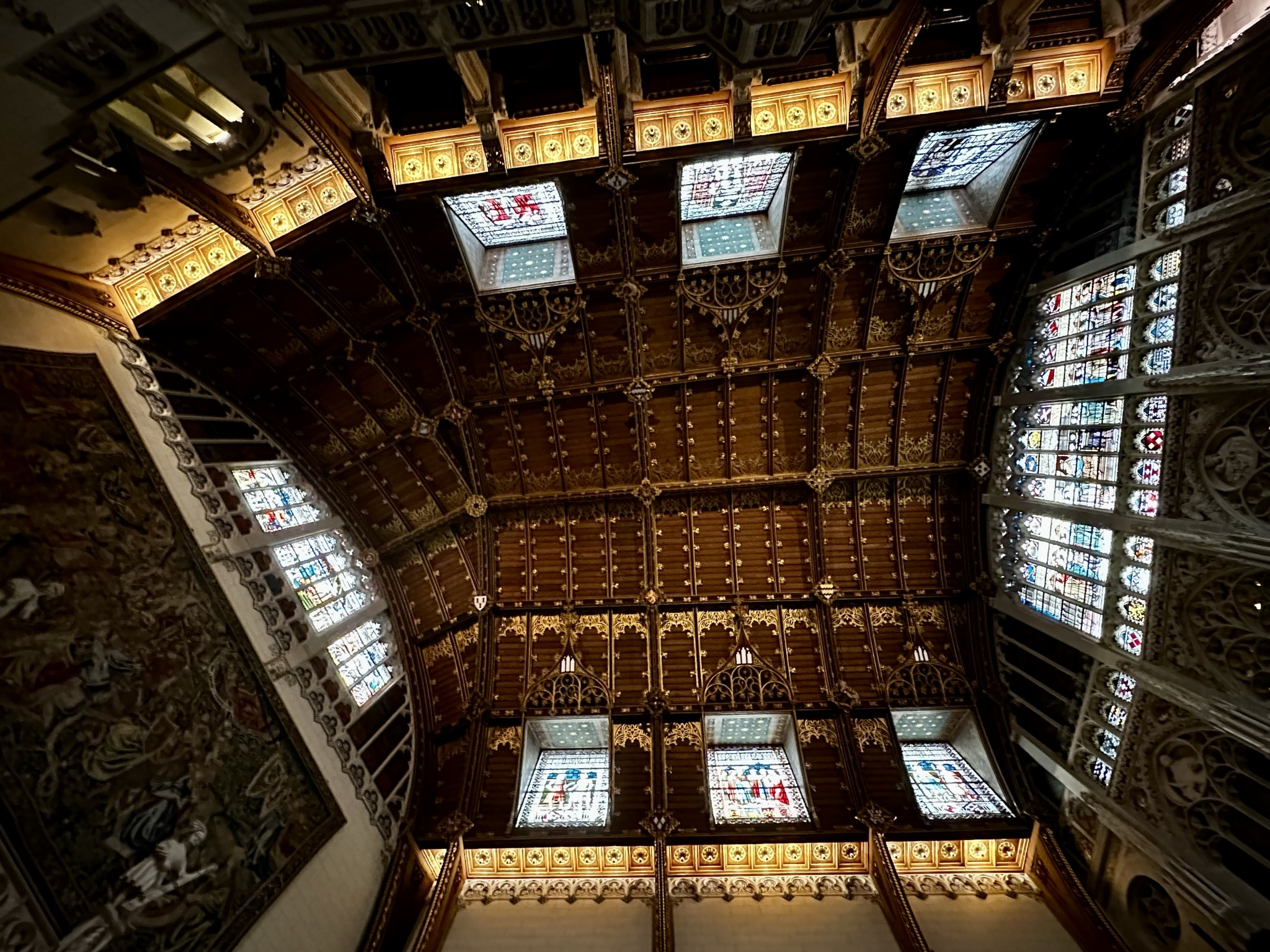
Central Hall ceiling

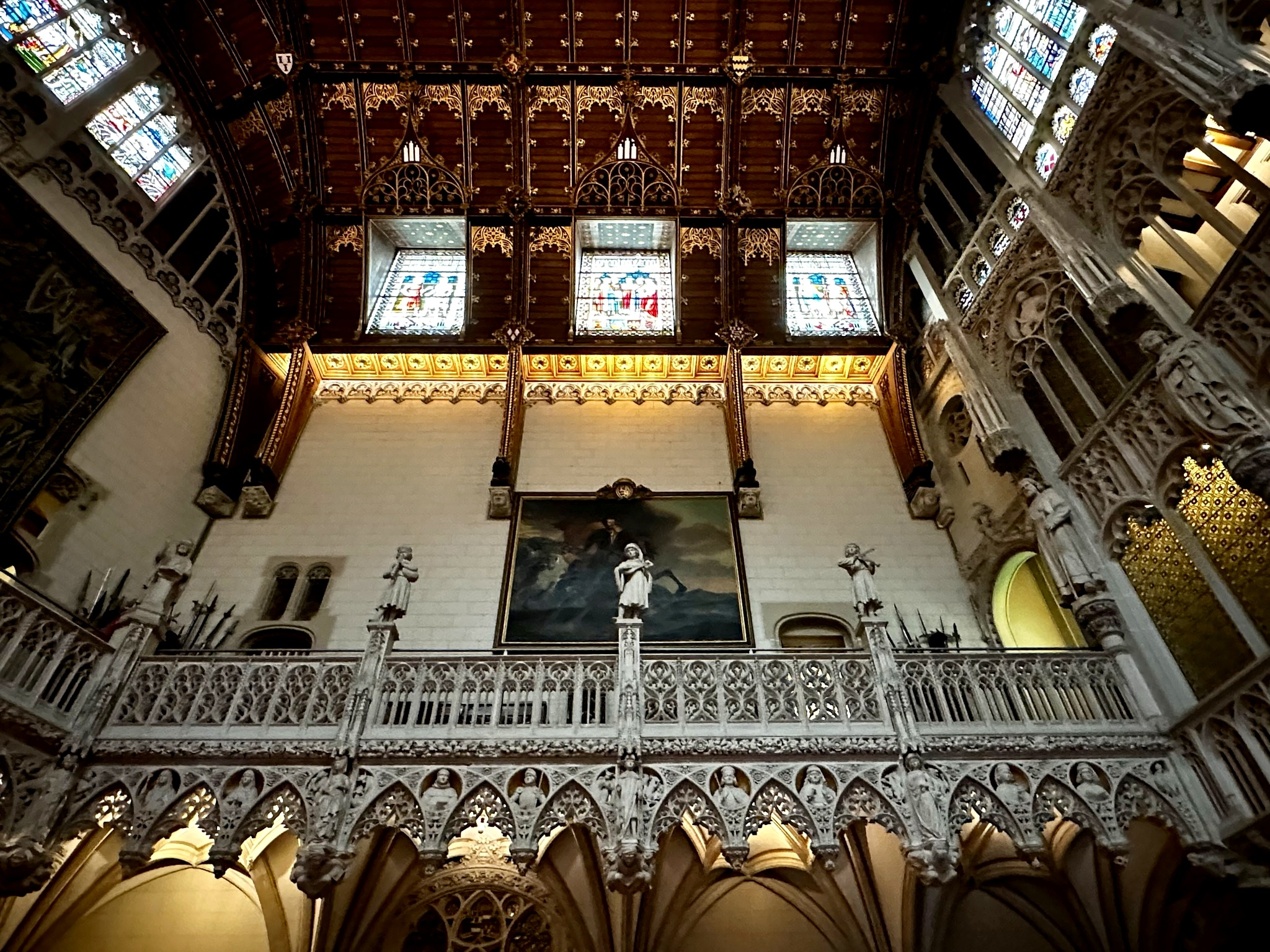
Statues and stained-glass windows inside the Central Hall

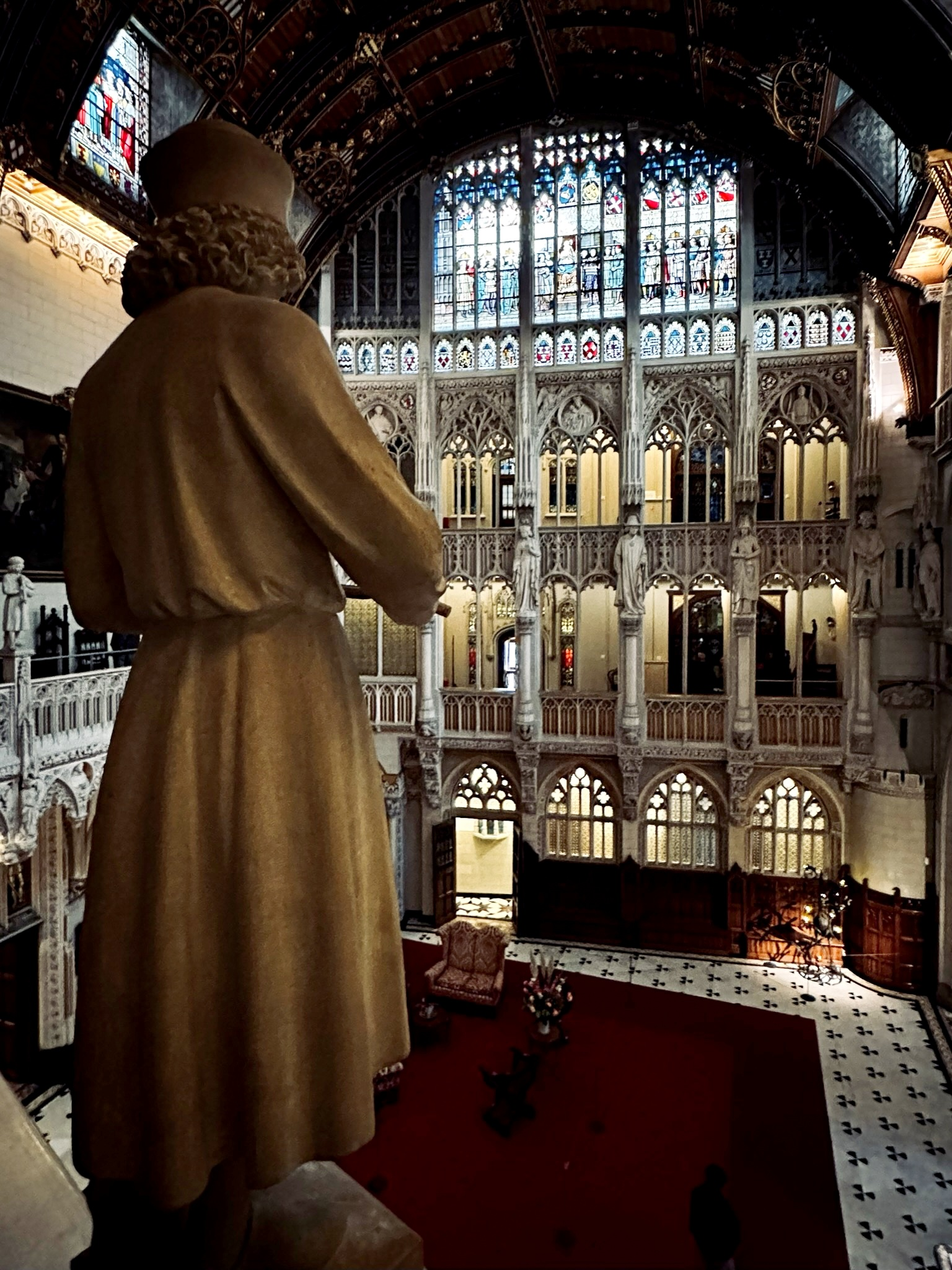
Statue overlooking the Central Hall

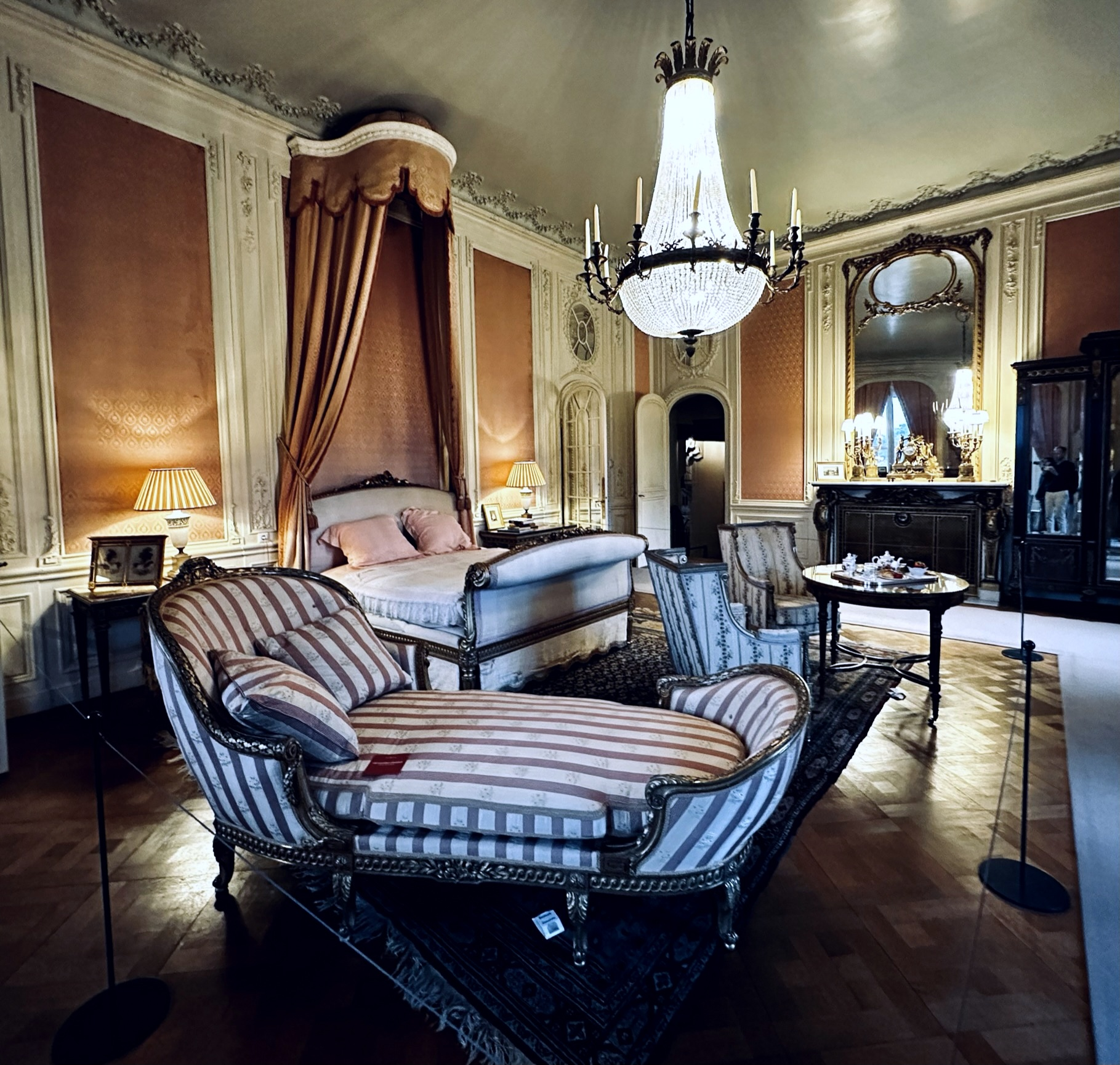
One of many bedrooms

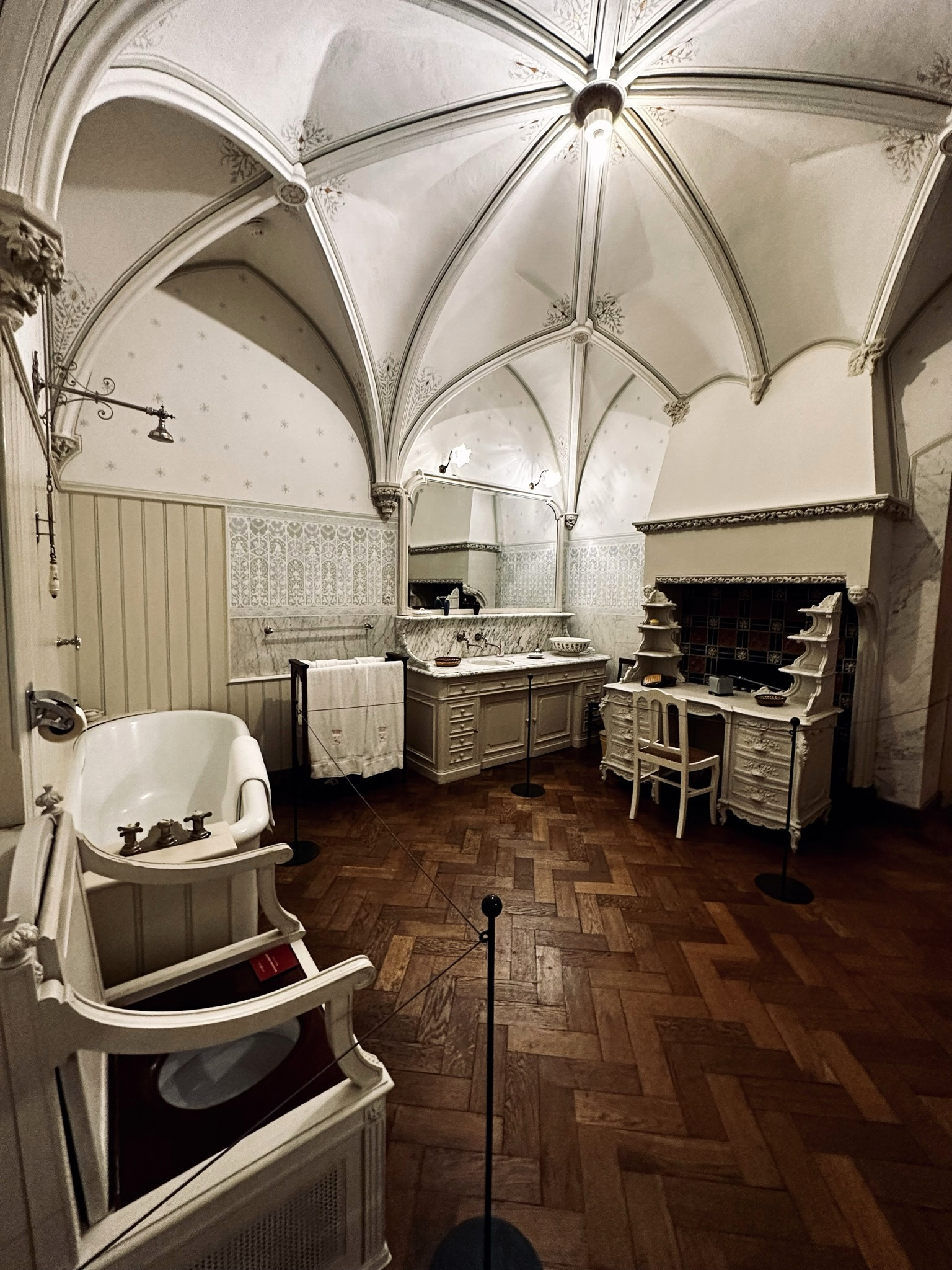
A bathroom with vanity

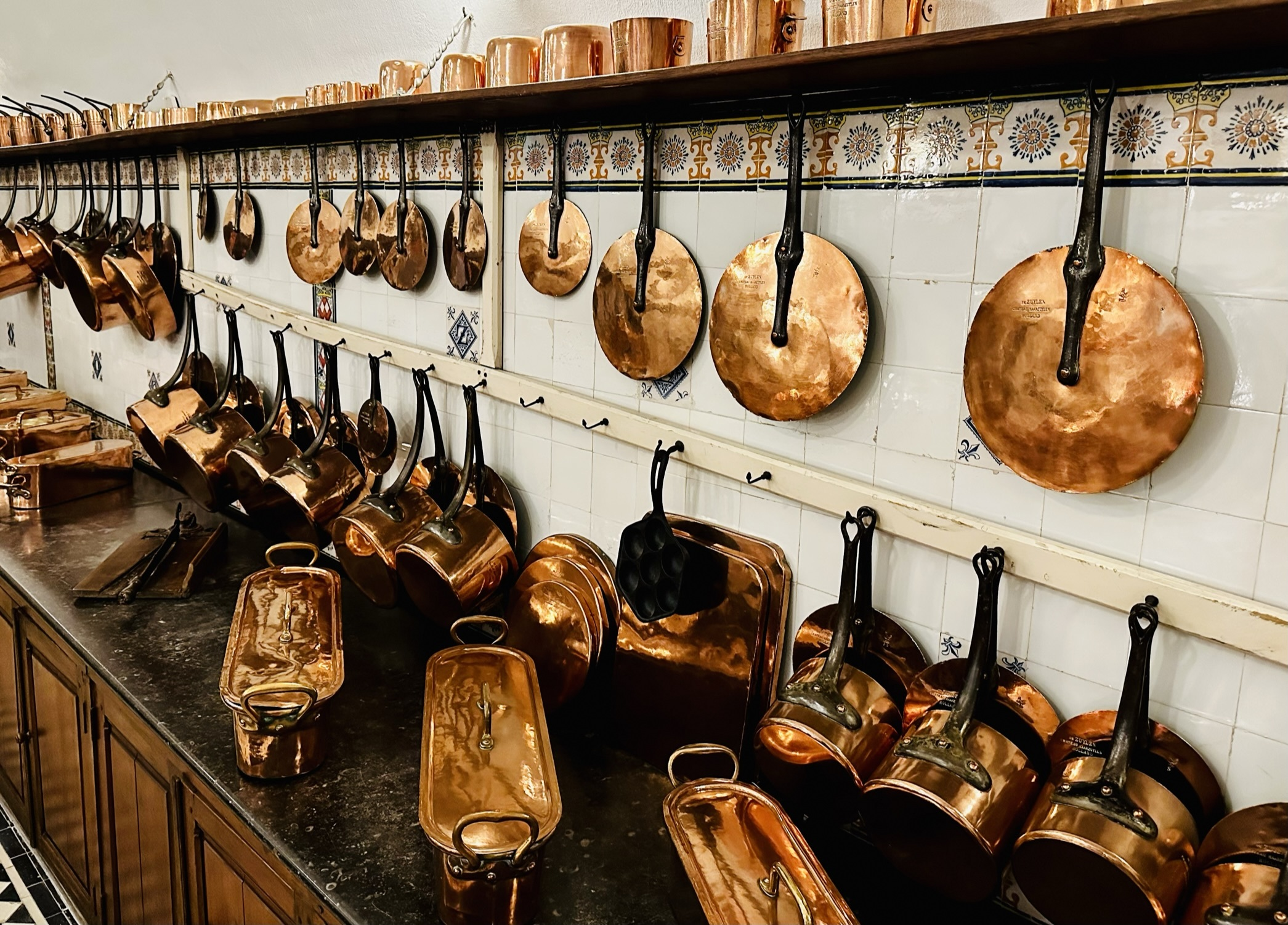
Kitchen and the copper pot collection

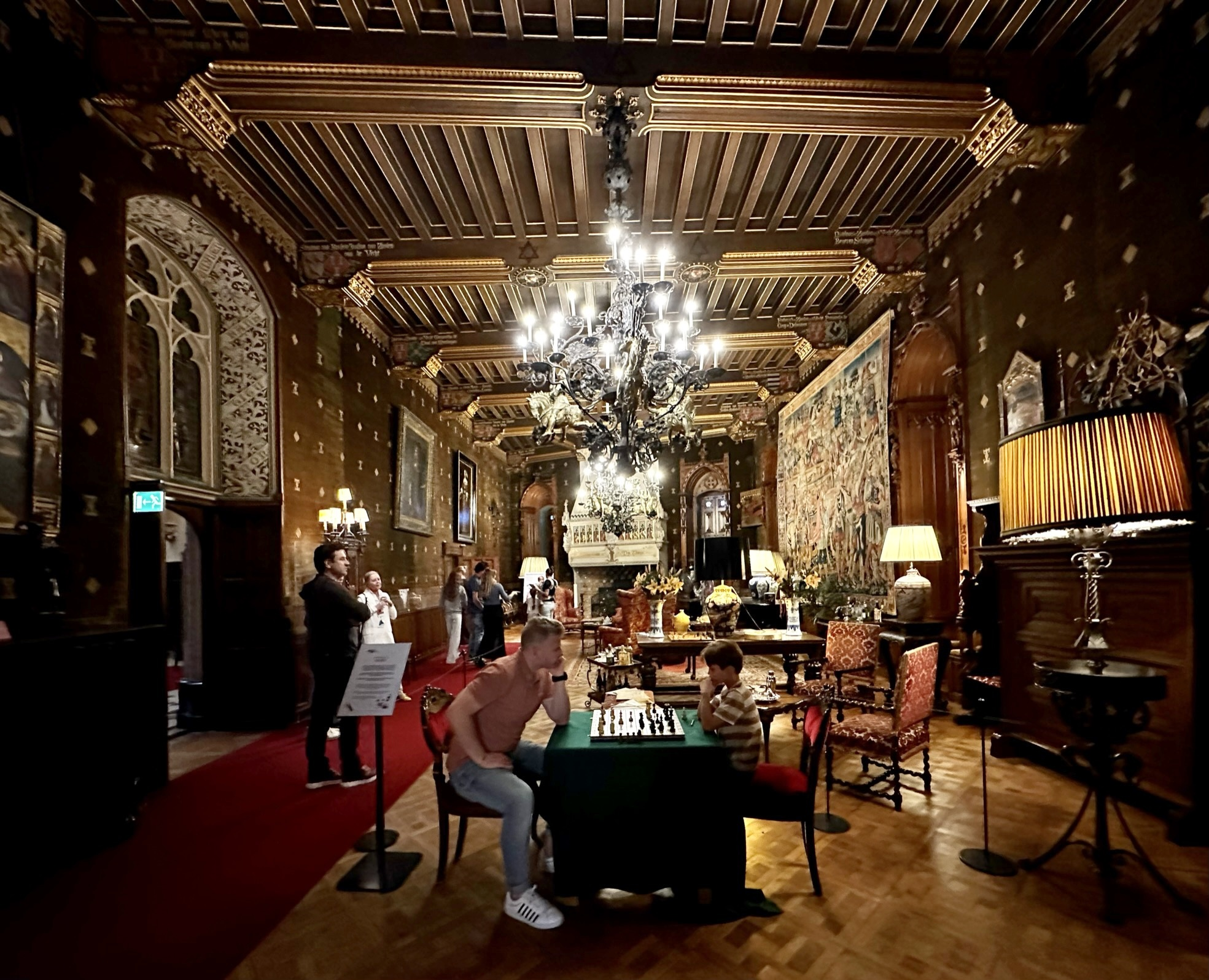
Game room

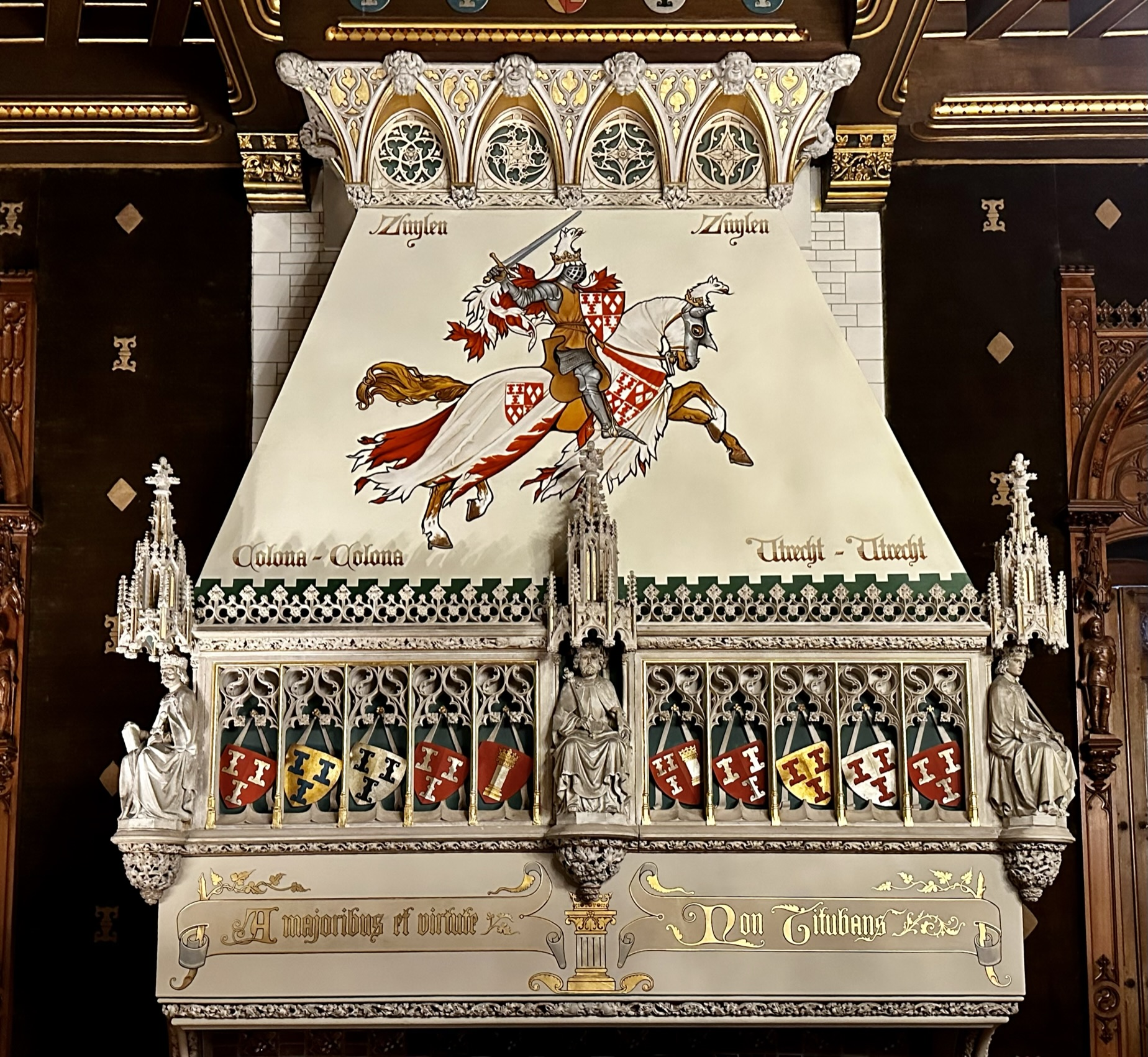
Decorated mantel

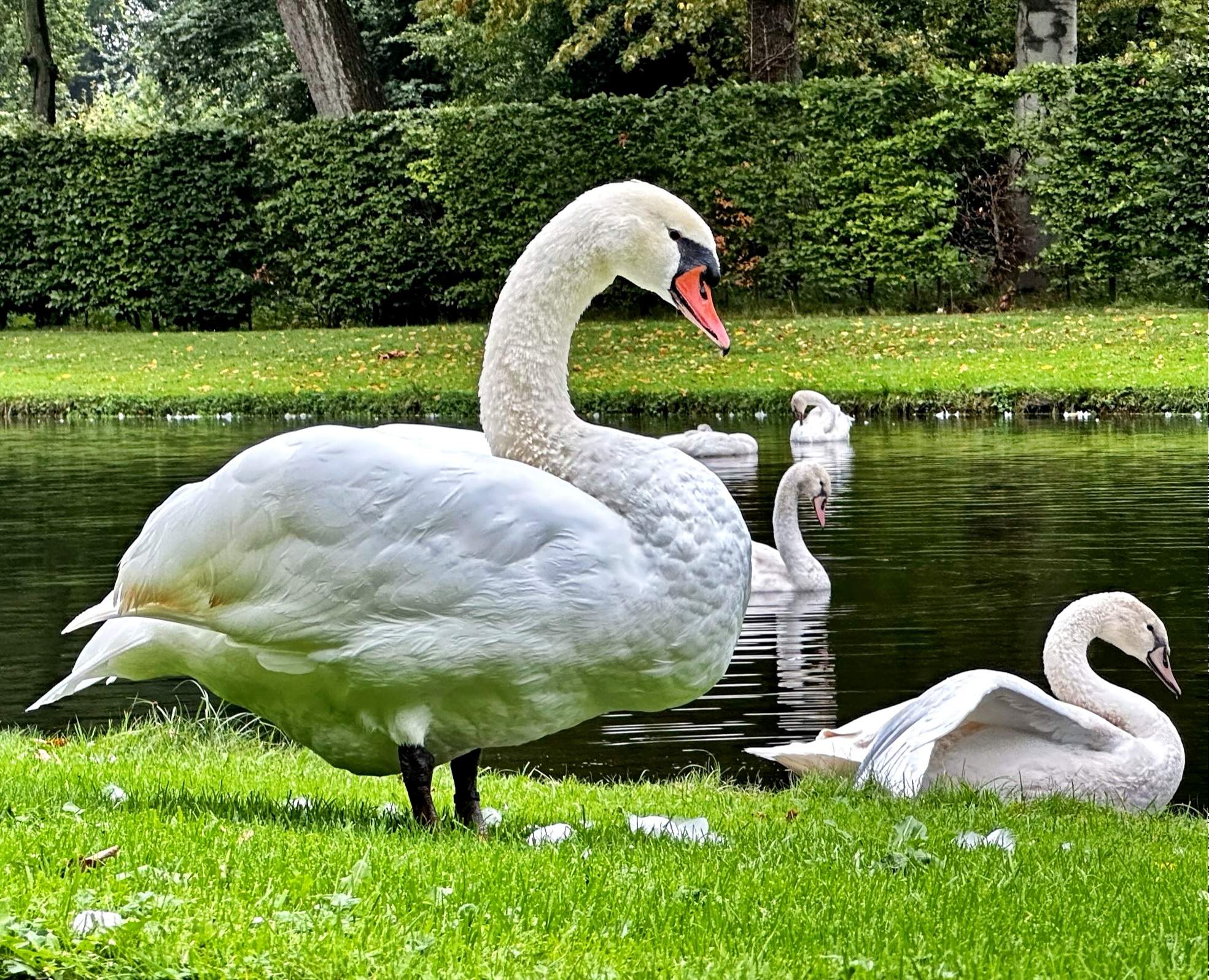
Swans in one of many gardens on the property

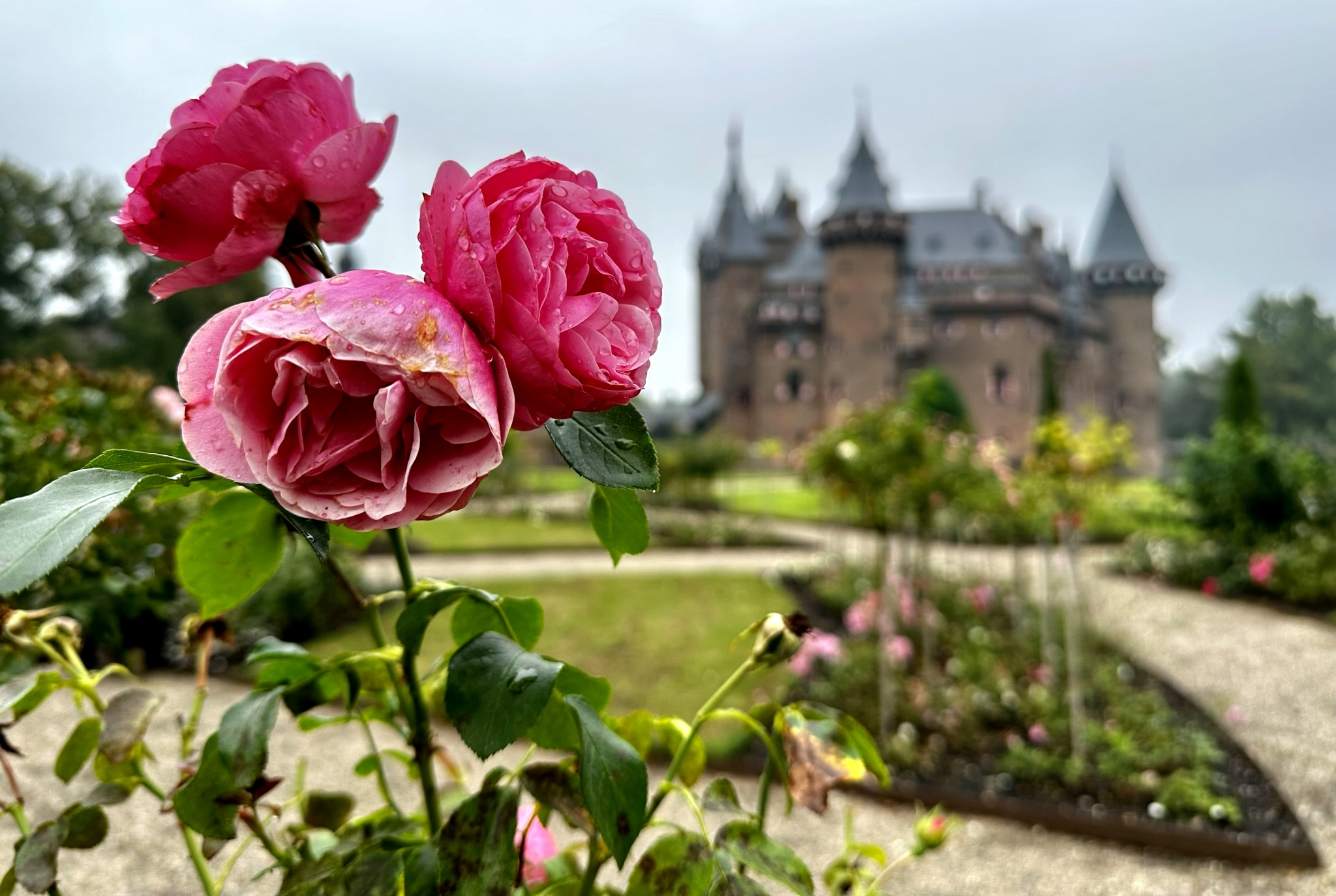
Flowers growing in the front garden

== See also ==
- List of castles in the Netherlands
- Hélène van Zuylen
- Marie-Hélène de Rothschild
- Rothschild family
- Waddesdon Manor
- Van Zuylen van Nievelt
- Van Zuylen van Nijevelt
- Slot Zuylen
