= Haarzuilens =

- Part of Utrecht
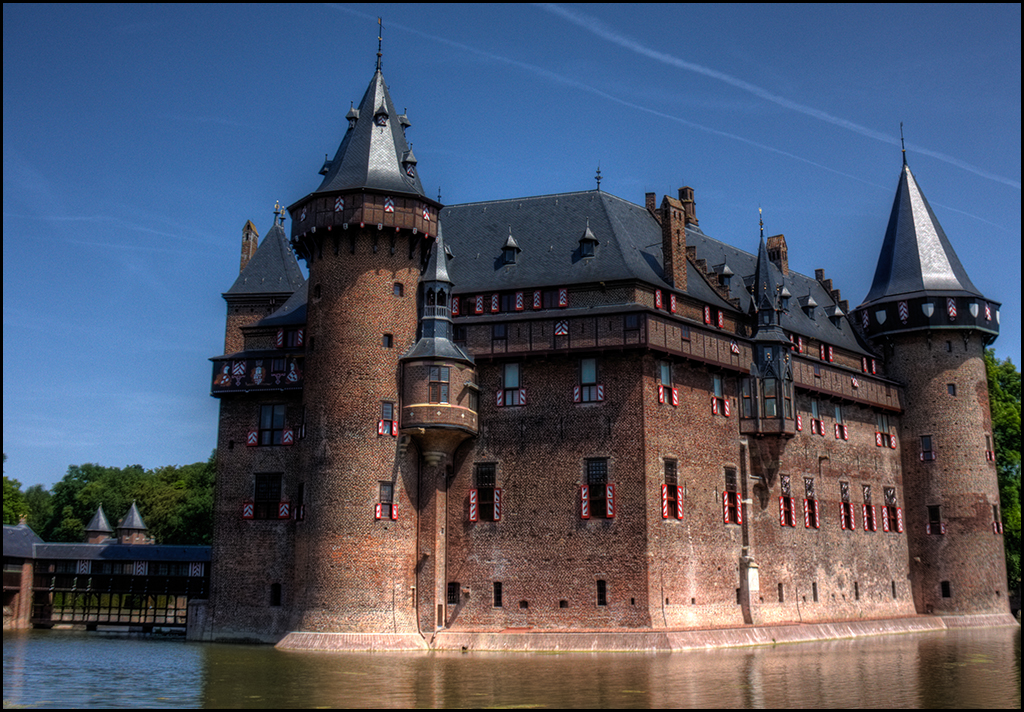
- Kasteel de Haar

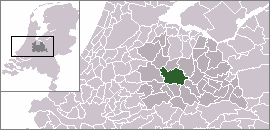

- The village centre (dark green) and the statistical district (light green) of Haarzuilens in the municipality of Utrecht.
- Coordinates: 52°7′17″N 4°59′47″E
- Country: Netherlands
- Province: Utrecht
- Municipality: Utrecht
- District: Vleuten-De Meern

Population (2018)
  - Total: 534
- Time zone: UTC+1 (CET)
  - Summer (DST): UTC+2 (CEST)

Haarzuilens is a village in the Utrecht province of the Netherlands. It is a part of the municipality of Utrecht, and lies about 12 km west of the city centre of Utrecht. It was a separate municipality until 1954, when it was joined to the municipality of Vleuten.

In 2018, the village of Haarzuilens had about 500 inhabitants.

Pronounced "Harzollens" by the local Dutch inhabitants, the village was built around the turn of the 19th century after its predecessor and the local castle De Haar had been destroyed in a devastating fire. The trees surrounding the castle are said to have originated in a forest on the other side of Utrecht. Local lore has it that several houses in Utrecht were demolished in order to move the trees to their new location and to give the castle's owner his forest without the decades usually required to grow new trees. Nevertheless, the owner allegedly went on a five-year honeymoon trip before the trees had been replanted.

It is famous for De Haar Castle, which is surrounded by gardens and is the location of the annual Elf Fantasy Fair. The castle, after 1892 fully refurbished by the Baroness Hélène van Zuylen and owned by baron Thierry van Zuylen since 2000, attracted 76,500 visitors in 2002.
