= Marie-Hélène de Rothschild =

French socialite

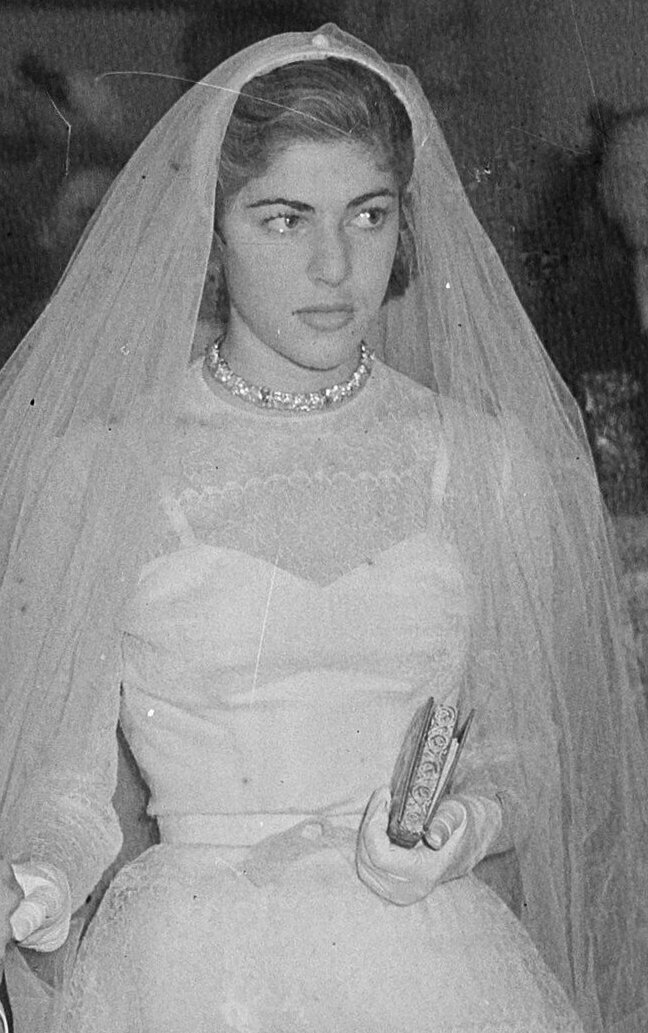
- Marie-Hélène at her 1950 wedding
- Born: Marie-Hélène Naila Stephanie Josina van Zuylen van Nyevelt van de Haar; November 17, 1927; New York City, United States
- Died: March 1, 1996 (aged 68); Touques, Calvados, France
- Spouses: François de Nicolay (m. 1950; div. 1956) Guy de Rothschild (m. 1957)

Marie-Hélène Naila Stephanie Josina de Rothschild (pronounced [maʁi elɛn də ʁɔt.ʃild]; November 17, 1927 – March 1, 1996) was a French socialite who became a doyenne of Parisian high-society and was a member of the prominent Rothschild banking family of France.

== Early life and education ==
Born Baroness Marie-Hélène Naila Stephanie Josina van Zuylen van Nyevelt van de Haar in New York City, she was the eldest of the three children of Marguerite Marie Namétalla and Baron Egmont Van Zuylen van Nyevelt. Her mother was born in Egypt of Syrian-immigrant parents, and her father was a diplomat and businessman of Jewish and Dutch descent. Marie-Hélène's paternal grandmother was Baroness Hélène de Rothschild, the first woman to take part in an international motor race and the daughter of Baron Salomon James de Rothschild. Marie-Hélène's paternal grandfather was the Dutch Roman Catholic Baron Etienne van Zuylen van Nyevelt of the House of Van Zuylen van Nievelt.

She was educated at Marymount College in Tarrytown, New York, and after finishing school she went to Paris.

== Marriages ==
Marie-Hélène was married twice:

- In 1950, she married the French Count François de Nicolay, a horsebreeder whom she had met in Paris after school. They had one son, Philippe de Nicolay (b. 1955). They divorced in 1956. Philippe is a director of Paris Orleans PA, a French investment bank belonging to the Rothschild family. Philippe is married to Princess Sophie de Ligne, the daughter of Belgium's Antoine, Prince of Ligne and princess Alix of Luxembourg.
- In 1957, she married her third cousin once-removed Baron Guy de Rothschild, head of the de Rothschild Frères bank. They were married on February 17, 1957, in New York City. This was the first time a head of one of the Rothschild families had married a non-Jewish spouse. Guy was forced to resign from the presidency of the Jewish community in France. Marie-Hélène, being Catholic, was required to get a papal dispensation in order to annul her first marriage so that she could remarry outside the Catholic faith. They had one child, Edouard Etienne Alphonse, who was raised Jewish.

== Ferrières Château ==
Her husband and his sisters, Jacqueline and Bethsabée, had been raised at the Château de Ferrières in the country outside of Paris. Seized by the Germans during the occupation of France in World War II, the château remained empty until 1959 when the newlywed Rothschilds decided to reopen it. Marie-Hélène took charge of refurbishing the huge château, making it a place where European nobility mingled with musicians, artists, fashion designers and Hollywood movie stars at grand soirées. Much talked about for the lavish and creative theme balls and charity fundraisers she organized both in Paris and New York, in 1973, she brought together five French couturiers and five American designers for a fashion show at the Théâtre Gabriel in the Château de Versailles.

She hosted regular parties at the Château, mainly inviting aristocracy, but which also included her friends from a wider society such as Grace Kelly and Audrey Hepburn (with whom she was a close friend).

In 1975, Château de Ferrières was gifted to the chancellery of the universities of Paris by Guy and Marie-Hélène de Rothschild but they retained the home they had built in the woods surrounding the château.

== Hôtel Lambert ==
In 1975, the couple purchased Hôtel Lambert on the Île Saint-Louis, one of the most luxurious mansions in Paris, where they took up residence in the top floors. Marie-Hélène became friends with the socialite Baron Alexis de Redé who was a tenant on the first floor in Hôtel Lambert and who would later become a fixture at her gatherings. In recognition of her importance in promoting French culture and fashion on an international level, Marie-Hélène de Rothschild was awarded the Legion of Honor.

== Illness and death ==
After battling cancer and crippling rheumatoid arthritis for more than ten years, Marie-Hélène de Rothschild died in 1996 at her Ferrières country home, aged 68. A Catholic funeral mass was held at the Saint-Louis-en-l'Île church in Paris, funeral guests were Valéry Giscard d’Estaing, Claude Pompidou, Bernadette Chirac, Gianni Agnelli, Alain Delon and Yves Saint Laurent. She was buried in Touques, Calvados where for more than a century her husband's branch of the French Rothschild family has owned Haras de Meautry, a noted horse farm.
