= Étienne van Zuylen van Nyevelt =

Belgian businessman

Baron Étienne van Zuylen van Nyevelt
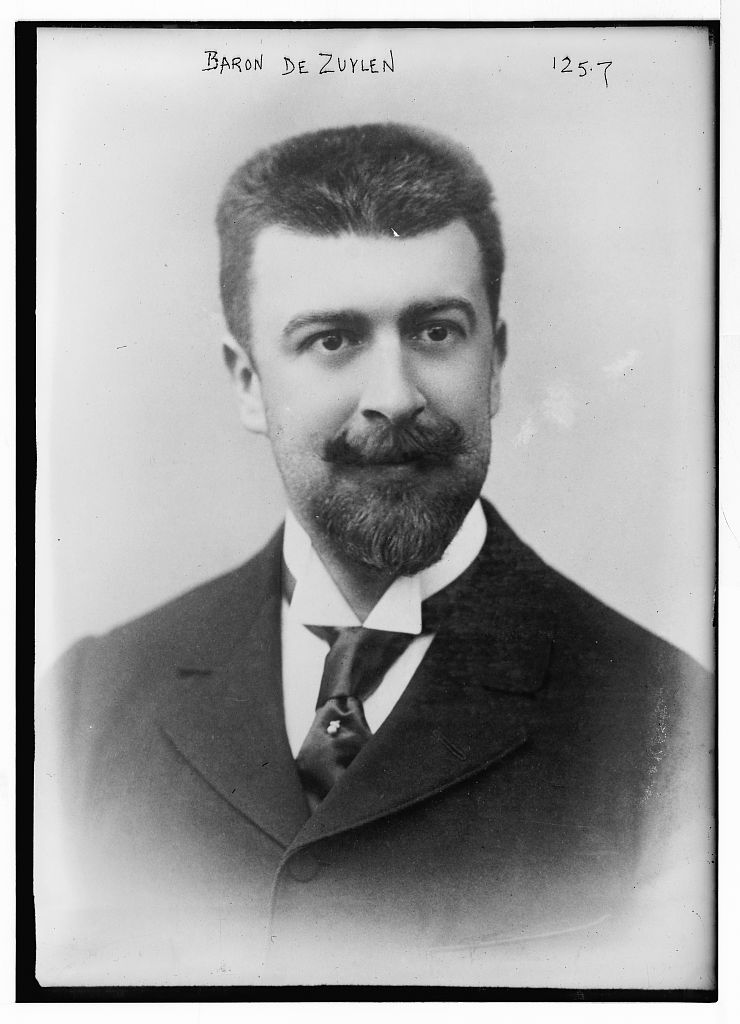

President of the Association Internationale des Automobile Clubs Reconnus (AIACR)
- In office 1904–1931
- Succeeded by: Robert de Vogüé

President of the Automobile Club de France
- In office 1895–1922
- Succeeded by: Robert de Vogüé

Personal details
- Born: Étienne Gustave Frédéric van Zuylen van Nyevelt van de Haar; 16 October 1860 Saint-Étienne, near Nice, France
- Died: 8 May 1934 (aged 73) Nice, France
- Spouse: Hélène de Rothschild (after 1887)
- Relatives: Marie-Hélène de Rothschild (granddaughter)
- Occupation: Banker, businessman
- Awards: Legion of Honour, Order of Leopold

Étienne Gustave Frédéric, 3rd Baron van Zuylen van Nyevelt van de Haar (16 October 1860 – 8 May 1934), was a Dutch-Belgian banker, businessman, philanthropist, equestrian and car enthusiast. He was a founding member of the Automobile Club de France, serving as the organisation's first president, and was the first president of the Association Internationale des Automobile Clubs Reconnus (AIACR, later known as the FIA).

== Personal life ==
Van Zuylen was born in Saint-Étienne, near Nice, on 16 October 1860, a member of the old Dutch Van Zuylen van Nievelt noble family; he was the 3rd Baron van Zuylen van Nyevelt van de Haar. His father, Gustave, was a diplomat and his grandfather, Jean-Jacques was a former mayor of Bruges. On 16 August 1887, Van Zuylen married Hélène de Rothschild, daughter of Salomon James de Rothschild of the Rothschild banking family of France, in Paris. They had two sons, Egmont and Hélin. Hélin was killed in a car accident in 1912, and Egmont worked as a diplomat; his eldest child was Parisian socialite Marie-Hélène de Rothschild.

In 1890, Van Zuylen inherited the ruined De Haar Castle and set about restoring it. Financed by Rothschild money and directed by Dutch architect Pierre Cuypers, work started in 1892 and took 20 years.

Van Zuylen received recognition with appointments as an officer of the Legion of Honour, and as a knight of the Order of Leopold.

Van Zuylen died in Nice on 8 May 1934.

== Cars and motorsport ==
With Jules-Albert de Dion and Paul Meyan, Van Zuylen was a founding member of the Automobile Club de France, and served as the organisation's first president between 1895 and 1922. He was also the first president of the Association Internationale des Automobile Clubs Reconnus (AIACR, English: 'International Association of Recognized Automobile Clubs'), later known as the Fédération Internationale de l'Automobile (FIA), holding the position from 1904 until his retirement in 1931.

== Equestrian ==
In June 1900, Van Zuylen took part in the four-in-hand mail coach event during the International Horse Show in Paris. He entered two teams, the second driven by Olivier, Count de La Mazelière. The event was part of the Exposition Universelle, and later classified as part of the 1900 Summer Olympics.
