= Salomon James de Rothschild =

French banker and socialite

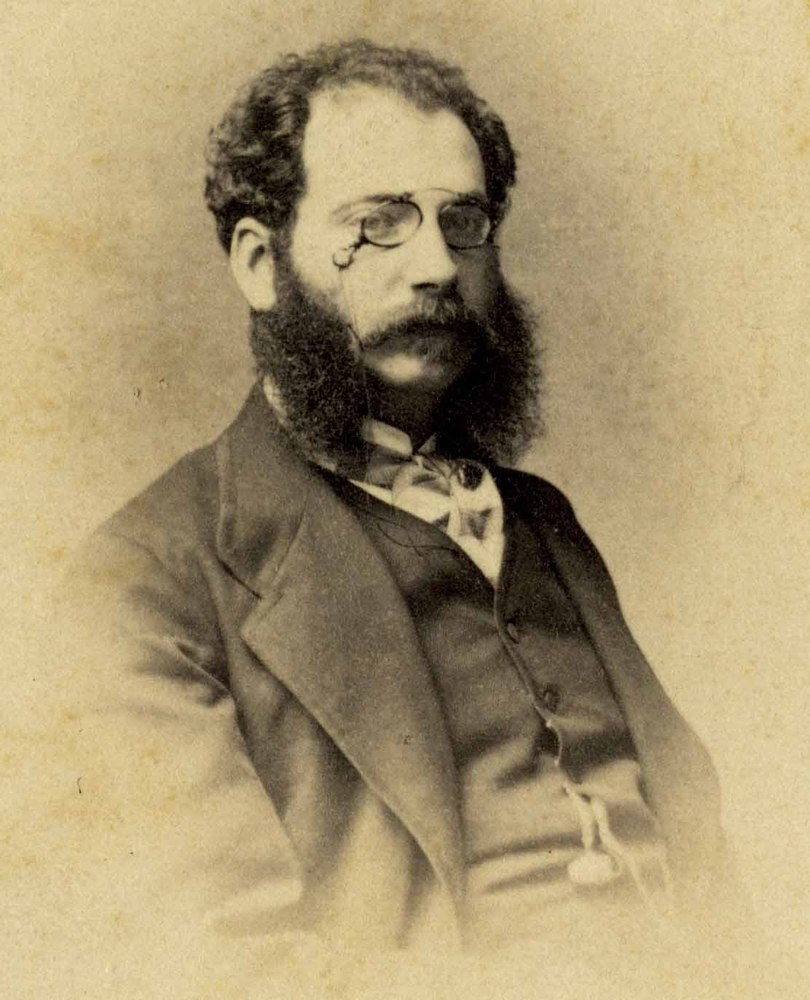
- Born: 30 March 1835; Paris, France
- Died: 14 May 1864 (aged 29); Paris, France
- Occupation: Banker
- Spouse: Adèle von Rothschild (m. 1862)
- Children: Hélène de Rothschild (1863–1947)

Salomon James de Rothschild (1835–1864) was a French banker and socialite.

== Early life ==
Salomon James de Rothschild was born on 30 March 1835. His father was James Mayer de Rothschild, head of the Paris branch of the Rothschild family of bankers.

== Personal life ==
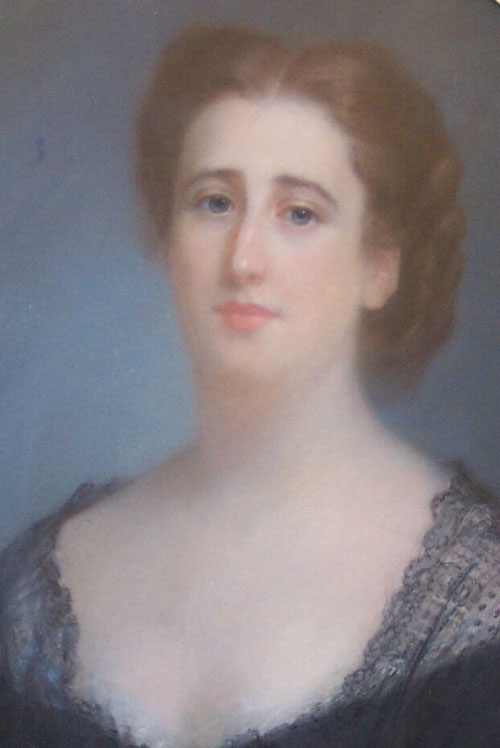
Adèle von Rothschild c. 1870 by Charles Louis Gratia

Salomon married Adèle von Rothschild, daughter of his cousin Mayer Carl von Rothschild. Their daughter Hélène de Rothschild became the Baroness Hélène van Zuylen van Nijevelt de Haar, after her marriage to the Dutchborn Roman Catholic Baron Étienne van Zuylen van Nyevelt van de Haar of the House of Van Zuylen van Nijevelt.
