= Automobile Club of France =

Private automobile men's club in France

Automobile Club de France
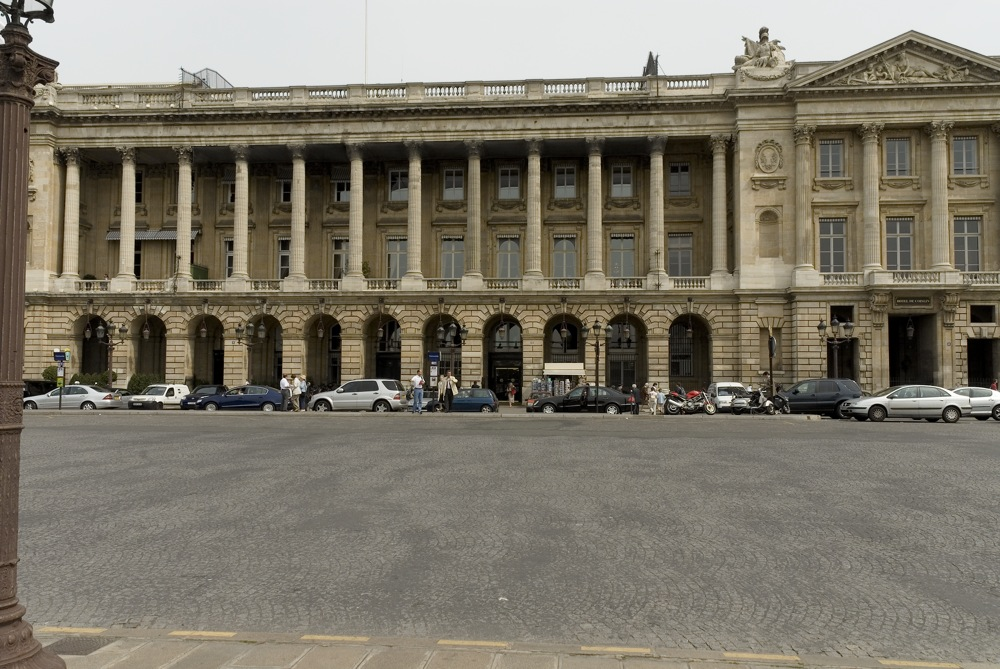
- Formation: 12 November 1895
- Founder: Marquis de Dion (Note: Participant of 1894 Paris-Rouen.); Baron de Zuylen (Note: Later became the President of The Association Internationale des Automobile Clubs Reconnus (AIACR, International Association of Recognized Automobile Clubs) in 1904, which later became FIA.); Count Récopé (Note: Later, he chaired the sporting committee of the club and organised the 1896 Paris–Marseille–Paris.); Paul Meyan (Note: Founder of a sports (rowing) directory, Annuaire français de l'Aviron, and publisher of a directory of intellects, Annuaire des diplômés, and magazine "La France Automobile". Co-organiser and participant of 1894 Paris-Rouen.)
- Headquarters: 6-8, Place de la Concorde, Paris
- President: Count Yann de Pontbriand
- Website: www.automobileclubdefrance.fr

The Automobile Club of France (French: Automobile Club de France) (ACF) is a gentlemen's club founded on 12 November 1895 in Paris. It is notable for its influence on the early automotive industry and motorsport industries in France and throughout the world. It advocated for the use and acceptance of automobiles in street traffic through lobbying of government law and policy; and promoted automobile use in touring. Its members included prominent motor manufacturers, business leaders and racing drivers. The club was a founder member of the Fédération Internationale de l'Automobile (FIA).

in 1952, the club yielded control of motorsport in France to the FFSA, an office of the French state. Today, the club maintains its head office on the Place de la Concorde in Paris, sharing the building and its facilities with the FIA. Facilities include lounges, swimming pool, gym, library containing more than 50,000 references, movie theatre, bars, dining rooms, hair salon and travel agency. Activities including yoga, squash, shooting, billiards and fencing are offered.

== History ==
=== Foundation ===
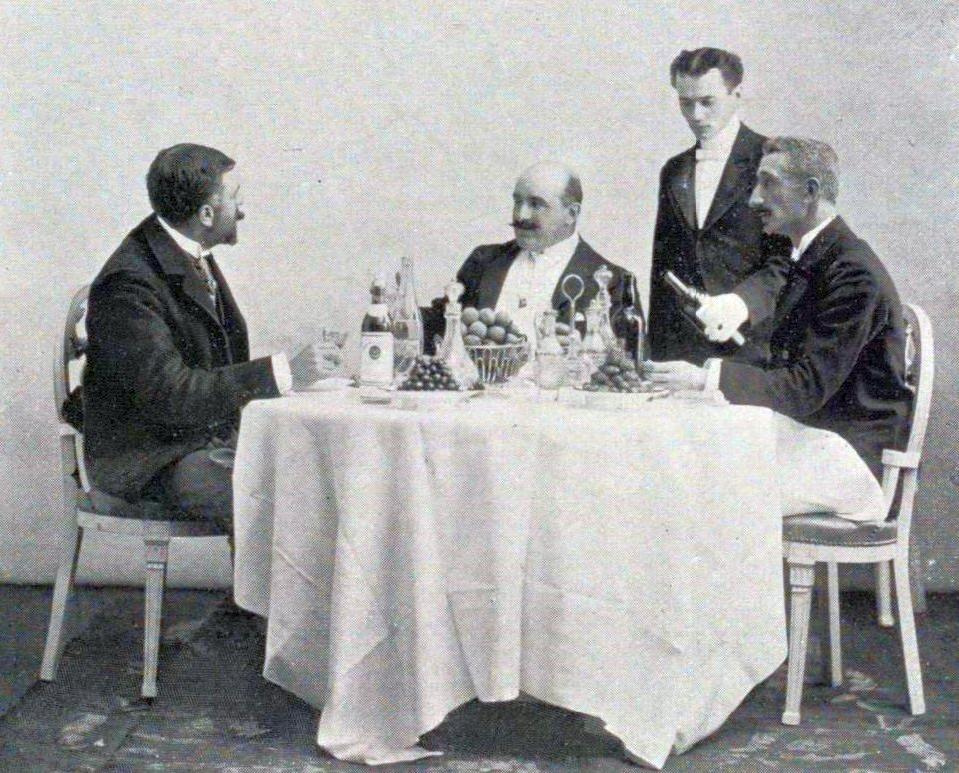
A lunch of the Paris-Bordeaux-Paris organising committee in October 1895 at which the proposal of forming the ACF was made. Seated left to right, van Zuylen, De Dion and Meyan. Count Récopé joined the meal later.

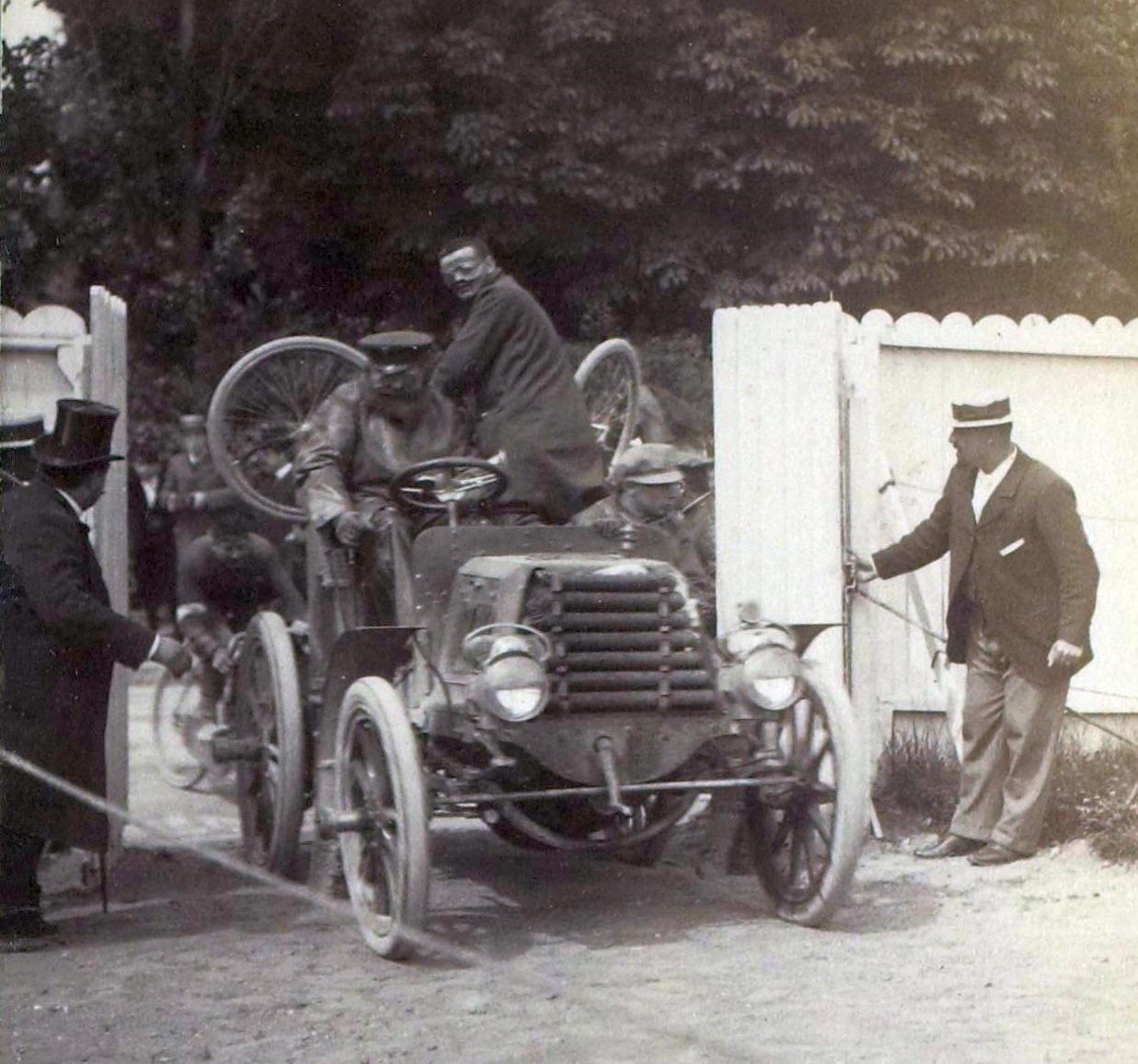
René de Knyff driving a Panhard-Levassor, coachbuilt by Carosserie Rothschild, (Note: J. Rothschild & Fils of Josef Rothschild at 33 Quai Michelet, Levallois-Perret, Paris (Clément-Rothschild was likely his joint venture with Adolphe Clément-Bayard), not to be confused with Rothschild & Co. at 530 W.27th St., New York of Maurice. J. Rothschild.) with which he won many races in 1899-1900 (Note: This picture was taken at the goal of Paris-Bordeaux Critérium des Entraîneurs (1899) bicycle race. Standing on the Panhard is Constant Huret who just won the event with a record-breaking result, achieved with Knyff driving ahead of the bicycle as the guide car, when nobody knew much about aerodynamic drag. This record stood for 34 years, and a car or motorcycle shielding the competitor by running immediately ahead was prohibited later by bicycle race organisers.)

Following Le Petit Journal's Paris-Rouen horseless carriage contest of July 1894, a committee of some competitors and automotive industry businessmen arranged to organise the Paris-Bordeaux-Paris race of June 1895. The committee included a pioneer automobile manufacturer, Marquis de Dion, and the eventual club's first president to-be, the noble-Dutch Baron Étienne van Zuylen van Nyevelt. After the race, de Dion proposed the idea of the Automobile Club de France to the temporary committee, declaring that "allowing such forces to disperse would be a crime against the fatherland". The proposal was agreed upon, however no action was taken as a result.

In October 1894, de Dion met with the newspaper and automobile magazine publisher, Paul Meyan, who suggested meetings of car owners could progress the manufacture and improvement of automobiles through collaboration. De Dion agreed and invited Meyan, with van Zuylen and decorated naval engineer (Count) Edmond Récopé, to dinner where the formation of the ACF was discussed. According to Meyan the club was named and founded by the time dessert was served. He was tasked with drafting the club's statutes.

At a 12 November 1895 meeting at de Dion's mansion at 25 quai d'Orsay, Paris, which involved further associates as founder members, the club's statutes were approved and the club was officially formed. Van Zuylen was appointed as club president.

The club, also known in French as "ACF" or "l'Auto", was initially located near the Paris Opera and benefited from a villa in the Bois de Boulogne. In 1898, the club moved to the site of the former "Place Louis XV" (currently Place de la Concorde) in order to offer its members more comfort in a prestigious setting. The club still occupies more than 10,000 square meters in the Hotels du Plessis-Bellière and Moreau.

=== Grand Prix and Formula One ===
After the Paris-Bordeaux-Paris race event organised in June 1895 by the initial members of this club, the highest level of motor racing in France was defined and organised by the Sporting Committee ("Commission Sportive") of the club initially in three classes, under 400 kg, 400–650 kg, and over 650 kg.

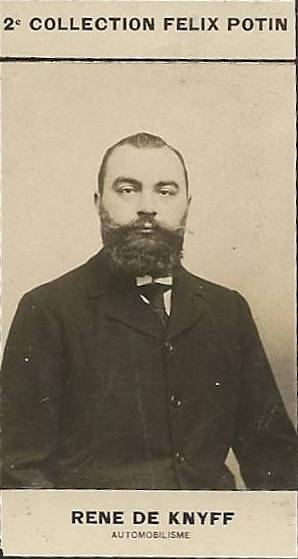
René de Knyff, circa 1908

In 1906, the term "Grand Prix" was adopted as the name of the largest race organised by ACF, Grand Prix de l'Automobile Club de France, which became a uniquely successful series of race events in the world, open to entrants from any country. The class divisions were redefined in engine size (as opposed to the previous vehicle weight) as the smaller Voiturette (under 1,500cc supercharged) and the unlimited 'Voiture' classes. After a period with series of fatal accidents and regulation changes, "under 1,500cc supercharged, or 4,500cc without" was adopted to the Voiture class in 1914, (Note: See 1914 French Grand Prix for details.) and the 'Voiturette' was redefined as "under 1,100cc without supercharger".

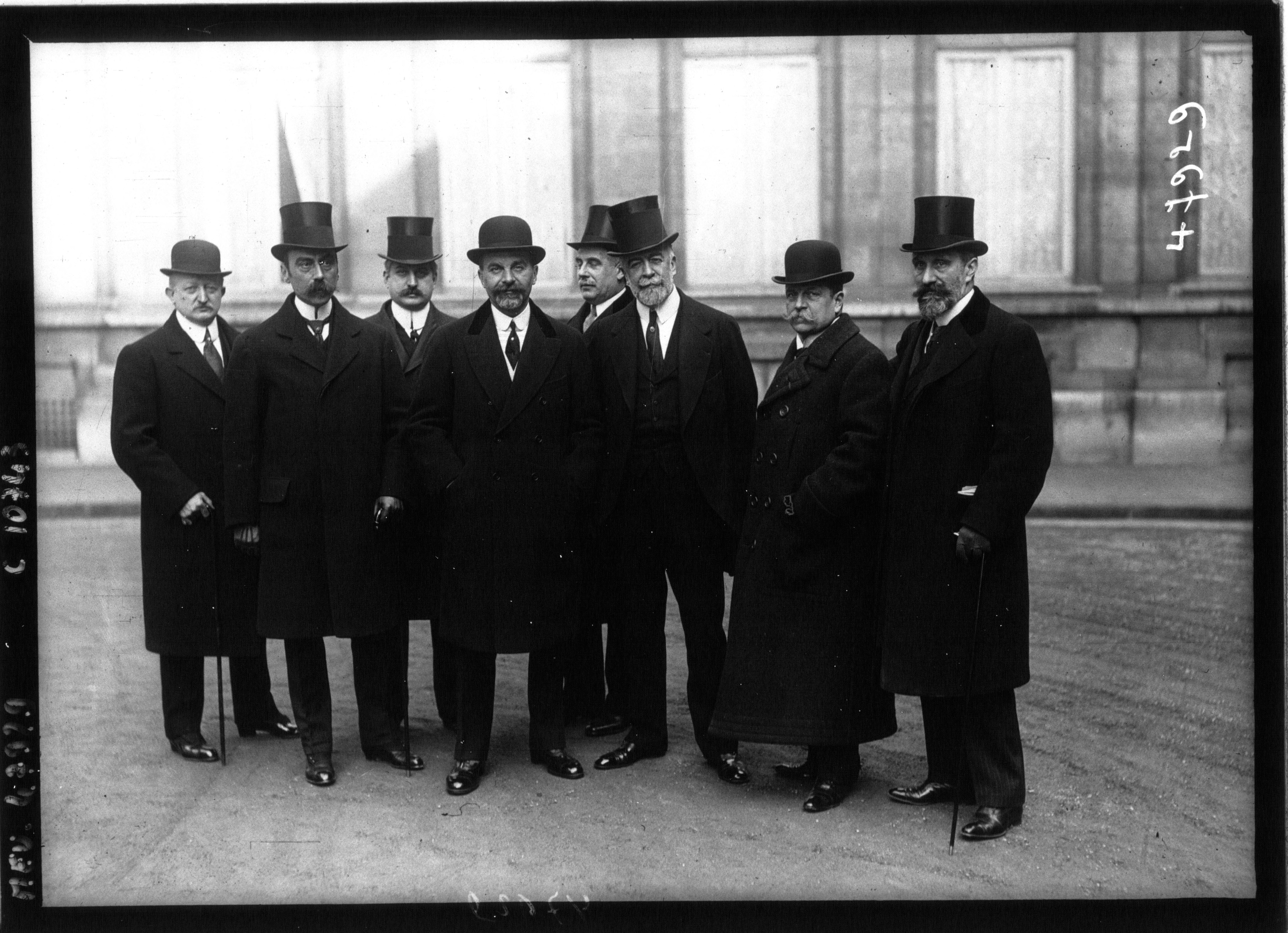
Competition governors (Sporting committee, "commission sportive") of ACF in 1914

World War I (1914–1918) disrupted racing until 1921 when the national annual event returned under the official name "ACF Grand Prix" (Grand Prix de l'A.C.F. in French, ACF stands for Automobile Club de France).

In 1946, the first internationally applicable racing regulation, Formula One, was proposed by ACF. This proposal was accepted by other members of AIACR, (Note: Which had become FIA in 1946. Probably because the French automobile industry used to be the largest in the world, and the French grands prix had been successful with international participation.) and it came into effect in 1947.

The "Grand Prix de l'A.C.F." name was used until 1967 when it was changed to French Grand Prix.

== Presidents ==
- 1895-1922 : Baron de Zuylen de Nyevelt (1860–1934), president of AIACR from 1904 to 1931.
- 1922-1928 : Count Robert de Vogüé (1870–1936), president of AIACR from 1931 to 1936.
- 1928-1948 : Viscount de Rohan-Chabot (1884–1968), president of AIACR from 1936 to 1946, president of FIA from 1946 to 1958
- 1948-1971 : Count Hadelin de Liedekerke Beaufort (1887–1974), president of FIA from 1958 to 1963
- 1971-1977 : Mr. Jean Richard-Deshais (1898–1978), chairman of Aero-club de France
- 1977-1989 : Mr. Jean Panhard (1913–2014), director of automobile manufacturer Panhard
- 1989-1998 : Mr. Philippe Clément
- 1998-2006 : Marquis Philippe de Flers (1927–2012), vice president of FIA
- 2006-2012 : Marquis du Rouret
- 2012-2018 : Mr. Robert Panhard
- 2018-2024 : Mr. Louis Desanges
- from 2024 : Count Yann de Pontbriand
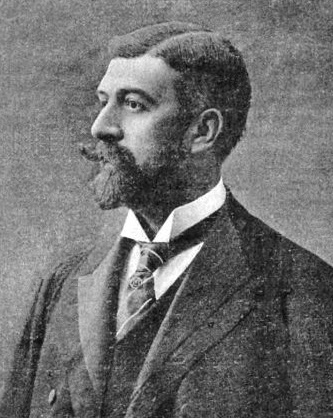
Baron Étienne van Zuylen van Nyevelt, the first president of ACF from 1895 to 1922 (picture in 1895)

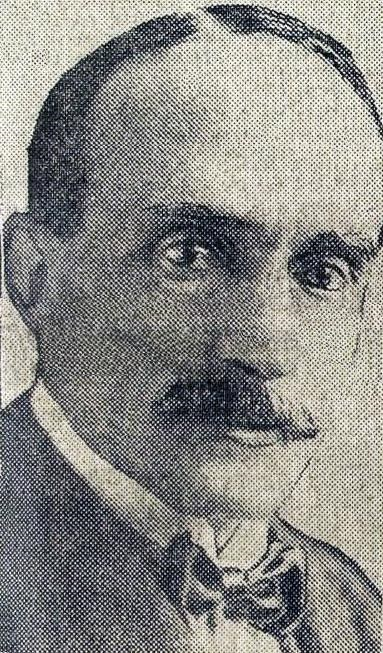
Count Robert de Vogüé, president of ACF from 1922 to 1928 (picture in 1926).

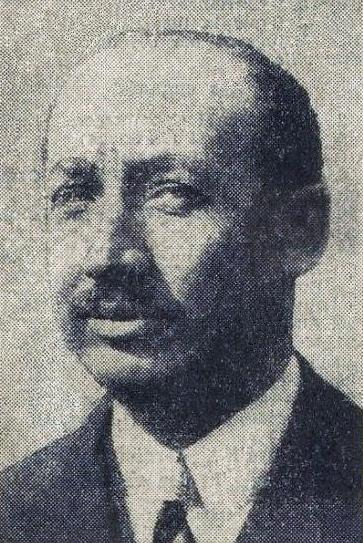
Viscount Jehan de Rohan-Chabot, president of ACF from 1928 to 1948 (picture in 1934)

== Eminent members ==
- François Bujon de l'Estang, former French ambassador to the United States
- Michel David-Weill, former head of Lazard Frères in Paris and New York
- Jean-Martin Folz, former CEO of Peugeot
- Gérard Wertheimer, co-owner of Chanel
- Alain-Dominique Perrin, CEO of Richemont
- Baron Ernest-Antoine Seilliere de Laborde, CEO of Wendel and former head of Medef
- Carlos Ghosn, former chairman & CEO of Renault and Nissan
- Roland Peugeot, former chairman of Peugeot
- Baron Guy de Rothschild
- Frantz Taittinger
