= Rothschild family =

Jewish noble banking family

Rothschild
- Jewish noble banking family
- Coat of arms granted to the Barons Rothschild in 1822 by Emperor Francis I of Austria
- Current region: Western Europe (mainly United Kingdom, France, and Germany)
- Etymology: Rothschild (German): 'red shield'
- Origin: Frankfurter Judengasse, Frankfurt, Holy Roman Empire
- Founded: 1760s (1577)
- Founder: Elchanan Rothschild (b. 1577)
- Current head: Nathaniel Rothschild, 5th Baron Rothschild
- Titles: List: Freiherr von Rothschild (1822); Baronet, of Tring Park (1847); Baron Rothschild (1885)
- Traditions: Goût Rothschild
- Motto: Concordia, Integritas, Industria (Latin for 'Harmony, Integrity, Industry')
- Estates: List: Family residences; British properties; Palais Rothschild
- Cadet branches: List: Austrian branch; English branch; French branch; Neapolitan branch
- Website: rothschildarchive.org

The Rothschild family (Hebrew: משפחת רוטשילד) is a wealthy Ashkenazi Jewish noble banking family originally from Frankfurt, Germany. The family's documented history starts in 16th-century Frankfurt; its name is derived from the family house, Rothschild, built by Isaak Elchanan Bacharach in Frankfurt in 1567. The family rose to prominence with Mayer Amschel Rothschild (1744–1812), a court factor to the German Landgraves of Hesse-Kassel in the Free City of Frankfurt, Holy Roman Empire, who established his banking business in the 1760s. Unlike most previous court factors, Rothschild managed to bequeath his wealth and establish an international banking family through his five sons, who established businesses in Paris, Frankfurt, London, Vienna, and Naples. The family was elevated to noble rank in the Holy Roman Empire and the United Kingdom. The only subsisting branches of the family are the French and British ones.

During the 19th century, the Rothschild family possessed the largest private fortune in the world, as well as in modern world history. The Rothschild family dominated international finance in Europe between the 1820s and the 1870s, when their hegemony over European finance was broken by joint-stock banks. The family's wealth declined over the 20th century and was divided among many descendants. Today, their assets cover a diverse range of sectors, including financial services, real estate, mining, energy, agriculture, and winemaking. The family is additionally involved in philanthropic endeavours and funds nonprofits. Many examples of the family's rural architecture exist across northwestern Europe. The Rothschild family has frequently been the subject of antisemitic conspiracy theories.

== Overview ==
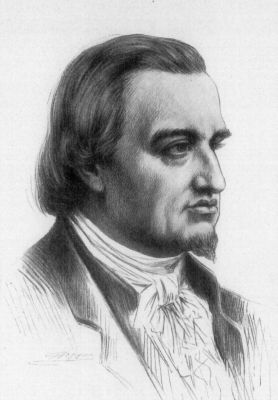
Mayer Amschel Rothschild, founder of the Rothschild banking dynasty.

The first member of the family known to use the name "Rothschild" was Isaak Elchanan Rothschild, born in 1577. The name is derived from the German zum rothen Schild (with the old spelling "th"), meaning "at the red shield", in reference to the house where the family lived for many generations (in those days, houses were designated not by numbers, but by signs displaying different symbols or colours). A red shield can still be seen at the centre of the Rothschild coat of arms. The family's ascent to international prominence began in 1744, with the birth of Mayer Amschel Rothschild in Frankfurt am Main, Germany. He was the son of Amschel Moses Rothschild (born circa 1710), a money changer who had traded with the Prince of Hesse. Born in the "Judengasse", the ghetto of Frankfurt, Mayer developed a finance house and spread his empire by installing each of his five sons in the five main European financial centres to conduct business. The Rothschild coat of arms contains a clenched fist with five arrows symbolising the five dynasties established by the five sons of Mayer Rothschild, in a reference to Psalm 127, "Like arrows in the hands of a warrior, so are the children of one's youth". The family motto appears below the shield: Concordia, Integritas, Industria ("Unity, Integrity, Industry").

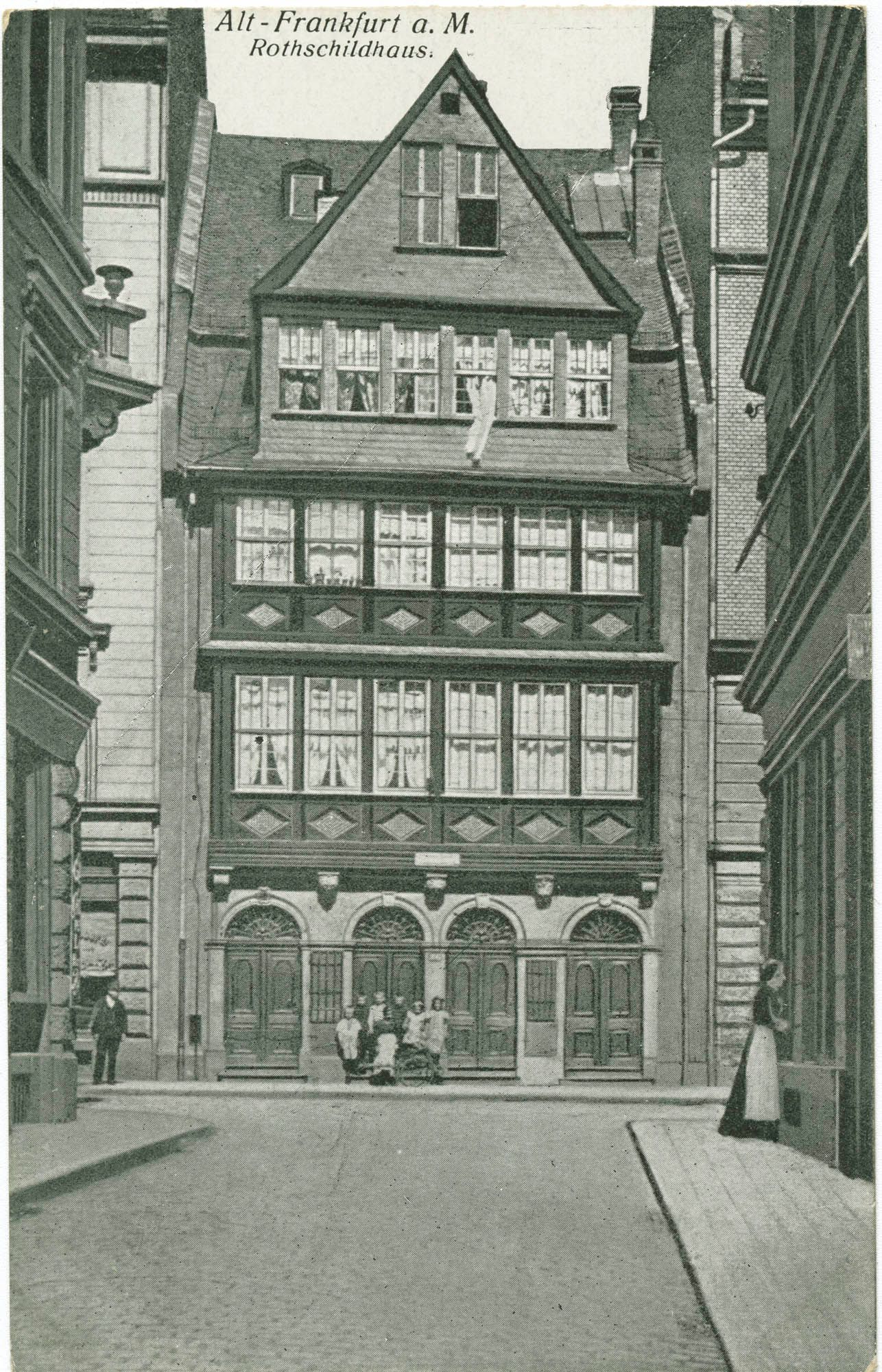
House of the Rothschild family, Judengasse, Frankfurt

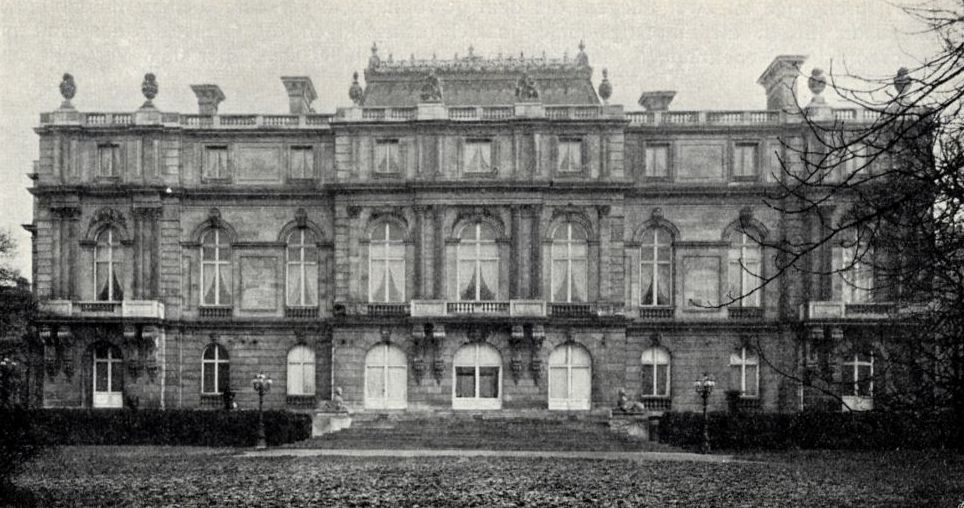
Palace of Baron Albert von Rothschild (photo 1884)

Paul Johnson writes "[T]he Rothschilds are elusive. There is no book about them that is both revealing and accurate. Libraries of nonsense have been written about them... A woman who planned to write a book entitled Lies about the Rothschilds abandoned it, saying: 'It was relatively easy to spot the lies, but it proved impossible to find out the truth.'" Johnson writes that, unlike the court factors of earlier centuries, who had financed and managed European noble houses, but often lost their wealth through violence or expropriation, the new kind of international bank created by the Rothschilds was impervious to local attacks. Their assets were held in financial instruments, circulating through the world as stocks, bonds and debts. Changes made by the Rothschilds allowed them to insulate their property from local violence: "Henceforth their real wealth was beyond the reach of the mob, almost beyond the reach of greedy monarchs." Johnson argued that their fortune was generated to the greatest extent by Nathan Mayer Rothschild in London; however, more recent research by Niall Ferguson indicates that similar or even greater profits were also realised by the other Rothschild dynasties, including James Mayer de Rothschild in Paris, Carl Mayer von Rothschild in Naples and Amschel Mayer Rothschild in Frankfurt.

Another essential part of Mayer Rothschild's strategy for success was to keep control of their banks in family hands, allowing them to maintain full secrecy about the size of their fortunes. In about 1906, the Jewish Encyclopedia noted: "The practice initiated by the Rothschilds of having several brothers of a firm establish branches in the different financial centres was followed by other Jewish financiers, like the Bischoffsheims, Pereires, Seligmans, Lazards and others, and these financiers by their integrity and financial skill obtained credit not alone with their Jewish confrères, but with the banking fraternity in general. By this means, Jewish financiers obtained an increasing share of international finance during the middle and last quarter of the 19th century. The head of the whole group was the Rothschild family..." It also says: "Of more recent years, non-Jewish financiers have learned the same cosmopolitan method, and, on the whole, the control is now rather less than more in Jewish hands than formerly." Mayer Rothschild successfully kept the fortune in the family with carefully arranged marriages, often between first- or second-cousins (similar to royal intermarriage). By the late 19th century, however, almost all Rothschilds had started to marry outside the family, usually into the aristocracy or other financial dynasties. His sons were:

- Amschel Mayer Rothschild (1773–1855): Frankfurt (died childless, so his fortune passed to the sons of Salomon and Kalman)
- Salomon Mayer Rothschild (1774–1855): Vienna
- Nathan Mayer Rothschild (1777–1836): London
- Kalman Mayer Rothschild (1788–1855): Naples
- Jakob Mayer Rothschild (1792–1868): Paris

The German family name "Rothschild" is pronounced [ˈʁoːt.ʃɪlt] in German, unlike /ˈrɒθ(s)tʃaɪld/ in English. The surname "Rothschild" is rare in Germany.

Families by country:

- Rothschild banking family of Austria
- Rothschild banking family of England
- Rothschild banking family of Naples
- Rothschild banking family of France

The five sons of Mayer Amschel Rothschild were elevated to the Austrian nobility by Emperor Francis I of Austria, and they were all granted the Austrian hereditary title of Freiherr (baron) on 29 September 1822. The British branch of the family was elevated by Queen Victoria, who granted the hereditary title of baronet (1847) and later the hereditary peerage title of Baron Rothschild (1885).

== Napoleonic Wars ==
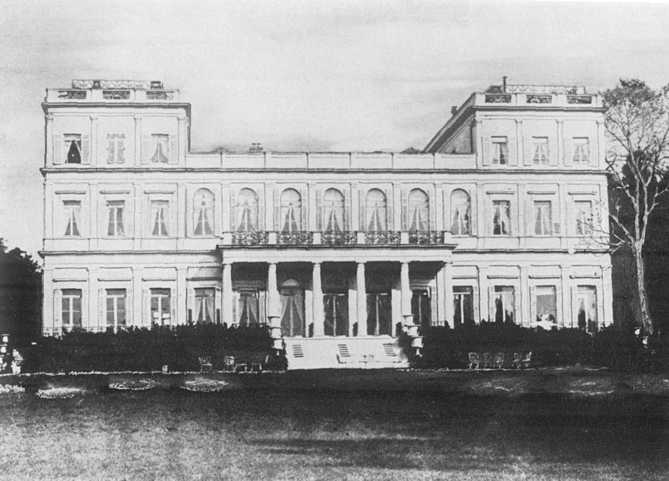
A landmark Rothschild palace in Frankfurt, Germany, Villa Günthersburg (photographed 1855)

The Rothschilds already possessed a significant fortune before the start of the Napoleonic Wars (1803–1815), and the family had gained preeminence in the bullion trade by this time. From London in 1813 to 1815, Nathan Mayer Rothschild was instrumental in financing the British war effort, organising the shipment and transfer of bullion and funds from Britain to the Duke of Wellington's armies across Europe, as well as arranging the payment of British financial subsidies to their continental allies. In 1815 alone, the Rothschilds provided £9.8 million (equivalent to about £910 million in 2024) in subsidy loans to Britain's continental allies.

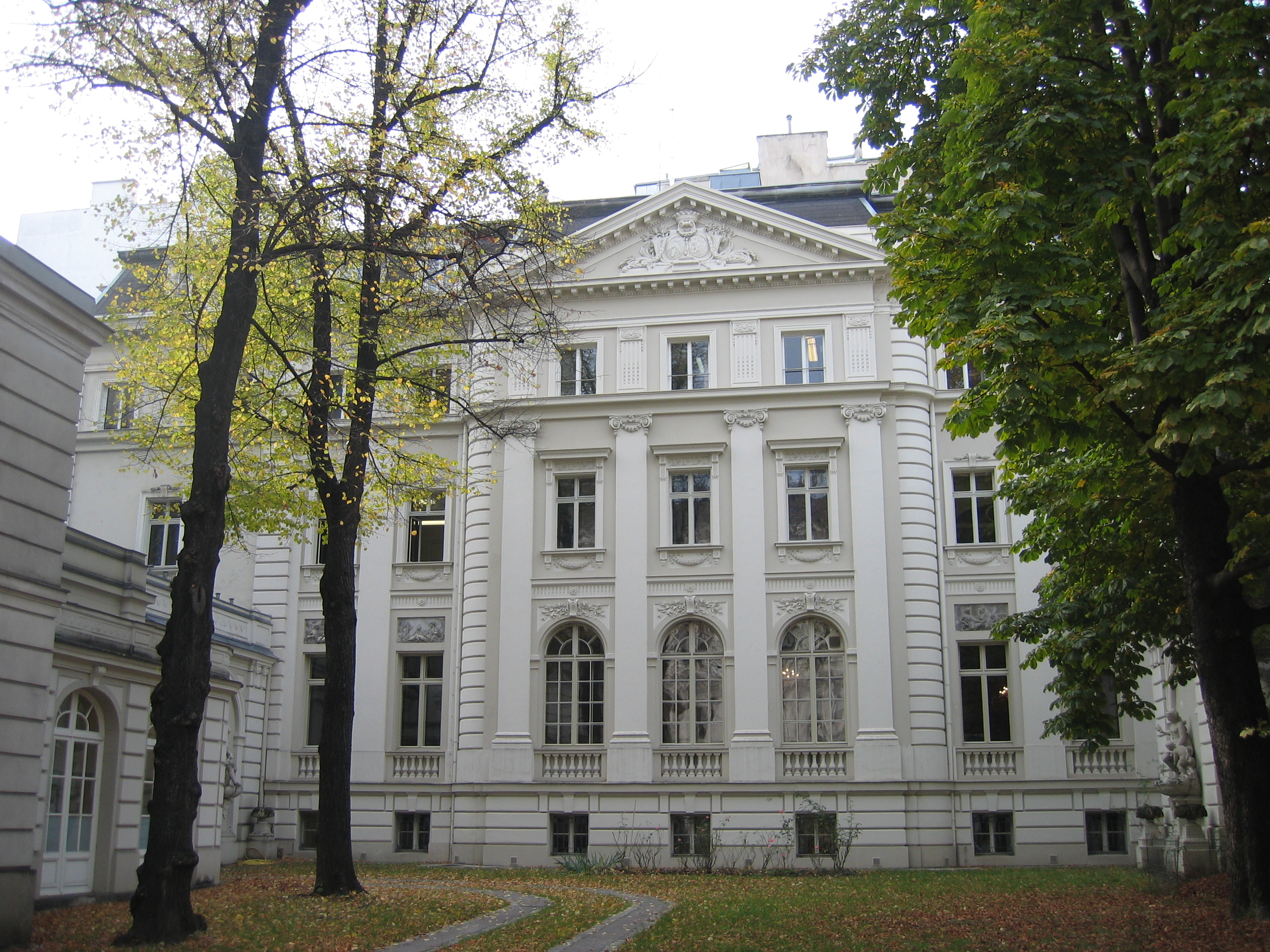
One of the smaller city houses, Vienna. A collection of far larger Viennese palaces known as Palais Rothschild were torn down during the Second World War.

The brothers helped coordinate Rothschild activities across the continent, and the family developed a network of agents, shippers and couriers to transport gold across war-torn Europe. The family network was also to provide Nathan Rothschild time and again with political and financial information ahead of his peers, giving him an advantage in the markets and rendering the house of Rothschild still more invaluable to the British government. In one instance, the family network enabled Nathan to receive in London the news of Wellington's victory at the Battle of Waterloo a full day ahead of the government's official messengers. Rothschild's first concern on this occasion was not to the potential financial advantage on the market which the knowledge would have given him; he and his courier immediately took the news to the government. That he used the news for financial advantage was a fiction then repeated in later popular accounts, such as that of Morton.

The basis for the Rothschilds' most famously profitable move was made after the news of British victory had been made public. Nathan Rothschild calculated that the future reduction in government borrowing brought about by the peace would create a bounce in British government bonds after a two-year stabilisation, which would finalise the post-war restructuring of the domestic economy. In what has been described as one of the most audacious moves in financial history, Nathan immediately bought up the government bond market, for what at the time seemed an excessively high price, before waiting two years, then selling the bonds on the crest of a short bounce in the market in 1817 for a 40% profit. Given the sheer power of leverage the Rothschild family had at their disposal, this profit was an enormous sum.

Nathan Mayer Rothschild started his business in Manchester in 1806 and gradually moved it to London, where in 1809 he acquired the location at 2 New Court in St. Swithin's Lane, City of London, where it operates today; he established N M Rothschild & Sons in 1811. In 1818, he arranged a £5 million (equivalent to £460 million in 2024) loan to the Prussian government, and the issuing of bonds for government loans formed a mainstay of his bank's business. He gained a position of such power in the City of London that by 1825–26 he was able to supply enough coin to the Bank of England to enable it to avert a market liquidity crisis.

== International high finance ==
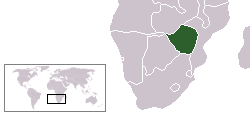
The family financed the creation of the country Rhodesia, and it became the site of the first international expansion of one of their mining enterprises—the Rio Tinto mining company.

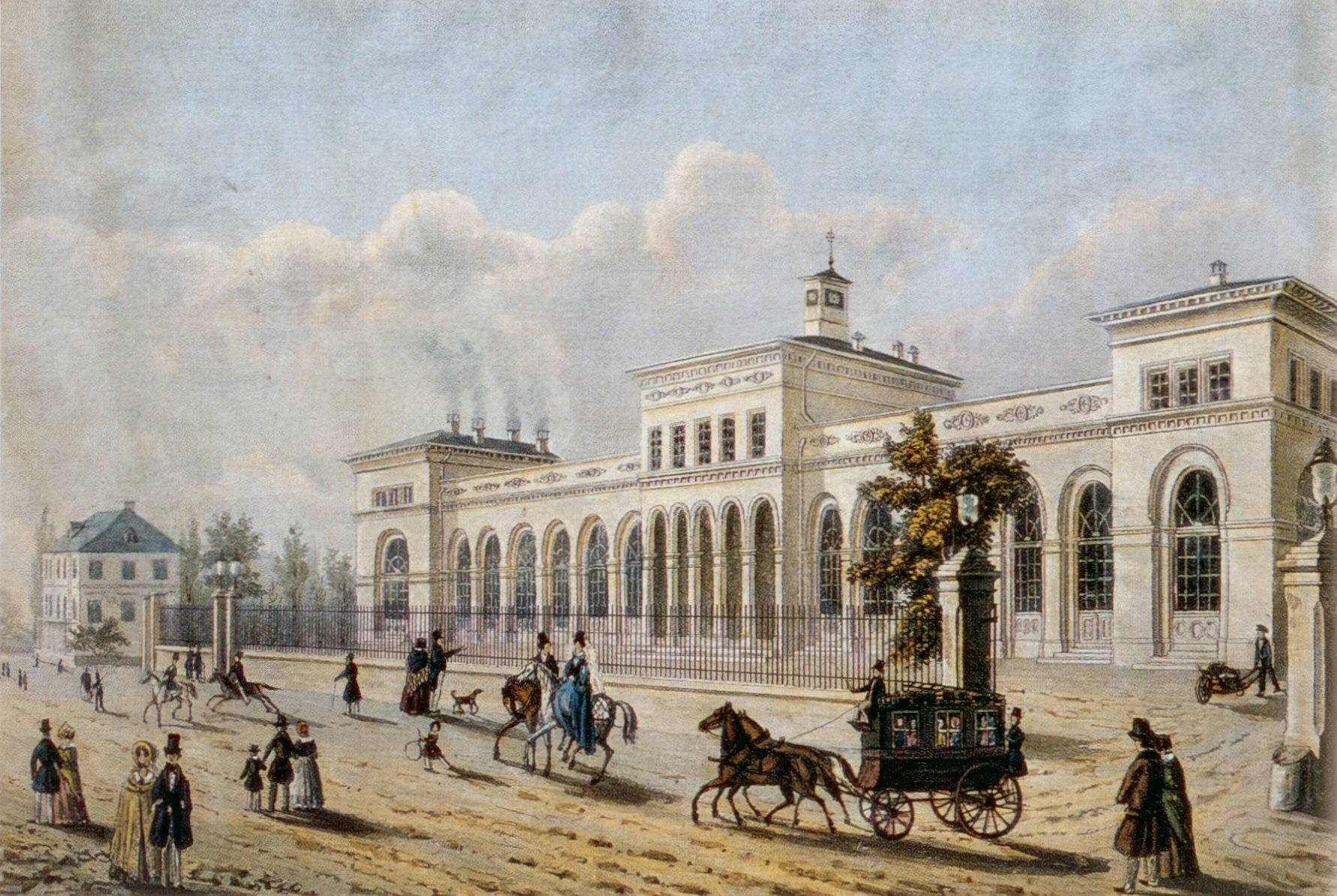
The Frankfurt terminus of the Taunus railway, financed by the Rothschilds. Opened in 1840, it was one of Germany's first railways.

Rothschild family banking businesses pioneered international high finance during the industrialisation of Europe and were instrumental in supporting railway systems across the world and in complex government financing for projects such as the Suez Canal. From 1895 through 1907 they loaned nearly $450,000,000 (equivalent to $15.5 billion in 2025) to European governments. During the 19th century, the family bought up a large proportion of the property in Mayfair, London.

The Rothschild family was directly involved in the independence of Brazil from Portugal in the early 19th century. Under an agreement, the Brazilian government was to pay a compensation of two million pounds sterling to the Kingdom of Portugal to accept Brazil's independence. N M Rothschild & Sons was pre-eminent in raising this capital for the government of the newly formed Empire of Brazil on the London market. In 1825, Nathan Rothschild raised £2,000,000, and indeed was probably discreetly involved in the earlier tranche of this loan which raised £1,000,000 in 1824. Part of the price of Portuguese recognition of Brazilian independence, secured in 1825, was that Brazil should take over repayment of the principal and interest on a £1,500,000 loan made to the Portuguese government in 1823 by N M Rothschild & Sons. A correspondence from Samuel Phillips & Co. in 1824 suggests the close involvement of the Rothschilds in this matter. Major 19th-century businesses founded with Rothschild family capital include:

- Alliance Assurance (1824) (now Royal & Sun Alliance)
- Chemin de Fer du Nord (1845)
- The Rio Tinto mining company (1873) (from the 1880s onwards, the Rothschilds had full control of Rio Tinto)
- Eramet (1880)
- Imerys (1880)
- De Beers (1888)

The family funded Cecil Rhodes in the creation of the African colony of Rhodesia. From the late 1880s onwards, the family took over control of the Rio Tinto mining company. The Japanese government approached the London and Paris families for funding during the Russo-Japanese War. The London consortium's issue of Japanese war bonds would total £11.5 million (at 1907 currency rates; £1.15 billion in 2012 currency terms).

The name of Rothschild became synonymous with extravagance and great wealth, and the family was renowned for its art collecting, for its palaces, as well as for its philanthropy. By the end of the century, the family owned, or had built, at the lowest estimates, 41 palaces, of a scale and luxury perhaps unparalleled even by the richest royal families. The British Chancellor of the Exchequer David Lloyd George claimed, in 1909, that Nathan, Lord Rothschild was the most powerful man in Britain. Niles' Weekly Register, Volume 49 had the following to say about the Rothschilds' influence on international high finance in 1836:

The Rothschilds are the wonders of modern banking ... we see the descendants of Judah, after a persecution of two thousand years, peering above kings, rising higher than emperors, and holding a whole continent in the hollow of their hands. The Rothschilds govern a Christian world. Not a cabinet moves without their advice. They stretch their hand, with equal ease, from [Saint] Petersburgh to Vienna, from Vienna to Paris, from Paris to London, from London to Washington. Baron Rothschild, the head of the house, is the true king of Judah, the prince of the captivity, the Messiah so long looked for by this extraordinary people. He holds the keys of peace or war, blessing or cursing. ... They are the brokers and counselors of the kings of Europe and of the republican chiefs of America. What more can they desire?

== Changes to family fortunes ==
The Neapolitan branch of the Rothschild family was the first to decline when revolution broke out and Giuseppe Garibaldi captured Naples on 7 September 1860 and set up a provisional Italian government. Because of the family's close political connections with Austria and France, Adolph Carl von Rothschild was caught in a delicate position. He chose to take temporary sanctuary in Gaeta with the last Neapolitan king, Francis II of the Two Sicilies; however, the Rothschild branches in London, Paris, and Vienna were not prepared or willing to financially support the deposed king. With the ensuing unification of Italy, and the mounting tension between Adolph and the rest of the family, the Naples house closed in 1863 after forty-two years in business. In 1901, the German branch closed its doors after more than a century in business following the death of Wilhelm Rothschild with no male heirs. It was not until 1989 that the family returned to Germany, when N M Rothschild & Sons, the British branch, and Bank Rothschild AG, the Swiss branch, set up a representative banking office in Frankfurt. By the start of the 20th century, the introduction of national taxation systems had ended the Rothschilds' policy of operating with a single set of commercial account records, which resulted in the various branches gradually going their own separate ways as independent banks. The system of the five brothers and their successor sons all but disappeared by World War I.

The rise of Nazi Germany in the 1930s led to a precarious situation for the Austrian Rothschilds under the annexation of Austria in 1938, when the family was pressured to sell its banking operation at a fraction of its real worth. While other Rothschilds had escaped the Nazis, Louis Rothschild was imprisoned for a year and only released after a substantial ransom was paid by his family ($480 million, adjusted for inflation). After Louis was allowed to leave the country in March 1939, the Nazis placed the firm of S M von Rothschild under compulsory administration. Nazi officers and senior staff from Austrian museums also emptied the Rothschild family estates of all their valuables. Following the war, the Austrian Rothschilds were unable to reclaim much of their former assets and properties. Later, the fall of France during the Second World War led to the seizure of the property of the French Rothschilds under German occupation. Despite having their bank restored to them at the end of the war, the French Rothschilds were powerless in 1982 as the family business was nationalised by the socialist government of newly elected President François Mitterrand. In addition, The New York Times wrote that the Rothschilds "grossly misjudged the opportunities directly across the Atlantic" and quoted Evelyn de Rothschild as saying that despite the accomplishments made by the various branches of the family in international high finance for over 200 years, "we never seized the initiative in America and that was one of the mistakes my family made."

== Hereditary titles ==
In 1816, four of the five sons of Mayer Amschel Rothschild were elevated to the Austrian nobility by Emperor Francis I of Austria. The remaining son, Nathan, was elevated in 1818. All of them were granted the Austrian hereditary title of Freiherr (baron) on 29 September 1822. As a result, some members of the family used the nobiliary particle de or von before their surname to acknowledge the grant of nobility. In 1847, Anthony de Rothschild was made a hereditary baronet of the United Kingdom. In 1885, Sir Nathan Rothschild, 2nd Baronet, was granted the hereditary peerage title of Baron Rothschild in the Peerage of the United Kingdom. This title is currently held by the 5th Baron Rothschild.

== Branches ==
=== English branch ===
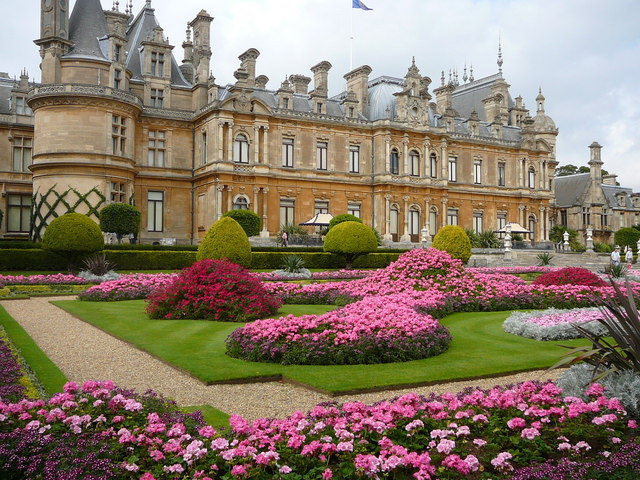
A Rothschild house, Waddesdon Manor in Waddesdon, Buckinghamshire, England, donated to the National Trust by the family in 1957

The Rothschild banking family of England was founded in 1798 by Nathan Mayer Rothschild (1777–1836), who first settled in Manchester but then moved to London. Nathan Mayer von Rothschild, the third son of Mayer Amschel Rothschild (1744–1812), first established a textile jobbing business in Manchester and from there went on to establish N M Rothschild & Sons bank in London.

During the early part of the 19th century, the Rothschild family's London bank took a leading part in managing and financing the subsidies that the British government transferred to its allies during the Napoleonic Wars. Through the creation of a network of agents, couriers and shippers, the bank was able to provide funds to the armies of the Duke of Wellington in Portugal and Spain, thereby funding the war. The provision of other innovative and complex financing for government projects formed a mainstay of the bank's business for the better part of the century. N M Rothschild & Sons' financial strength in the City of London became such that, by 1825–26, the bank was able to supply enough coin to the Bank of England to enable it to avert a liquidity crisis.

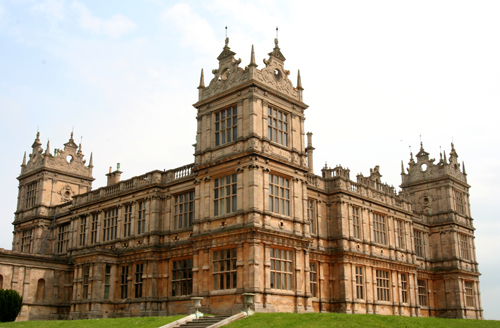
Mentmore Towers, one of the many Rothschild mansions built in Buckinghamshire

Nathan Mayer's eldest son, Lionel de Rothschild (1808–1879), succeeded him as head of the London branch. Under Lionel, the bank financed the British government's 1875 purchase of Egypt's interest in the Suez Canal. The Rothschild bank also funded Cecil Rhodes in the development of the British South Africa Company. Leopold de Rothschild (1845–1917) administered Rhodes's estate after his death in 1902 and helped to set up the Rhodes Scholarship scheme at the University of Oxford. In 1873, de Rothschild Frères in France and N M Rothschild & Sons of London joined with other investors to acquire the Spanish government's money-losing Rio Tinto copper mines. The new owners restructured the company and turned it into a profitable business. By 1905, the Rothschild interest in Rio Tinto amounted to more than 30 percent. In 1887, the French and British Rothschild banking houses loaned money to, and invested in, the De Beers diamond mines in South Africa, becoming its largest shareholders.

The London banking house continued under the management of Lionel Nathan de Rothschild (1882–1942) and his brother Anthony Gustav de Rothschild (1887–1961), and then passed to Sir Evelyn de Rothschild (1931–2022). In 2003, following Sir Evelyn's retirement as head of N M Rothschild & Sons of London, the British and French financial firms merged under the leadership of David René de Rothschild.

=== French branches ===
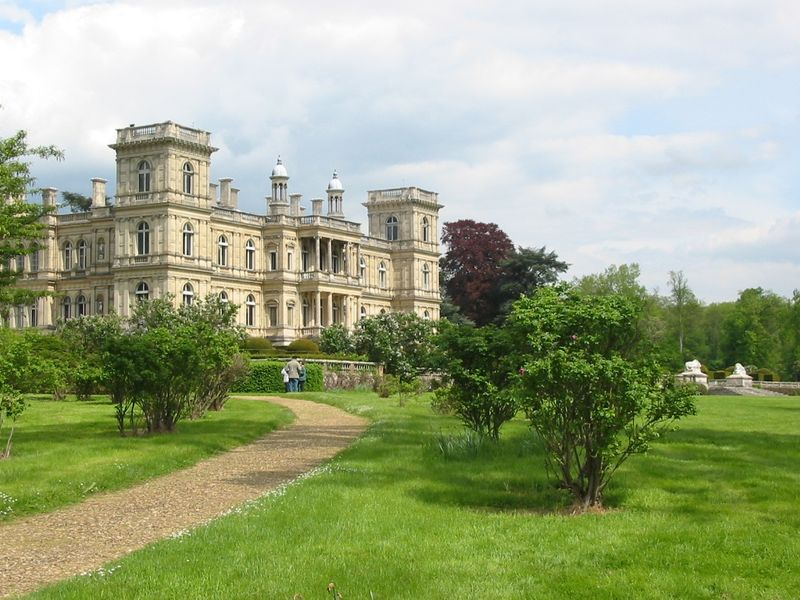
Château de Ferrières, the largest château of the 19th century, was built in 1854. It is set on a 30 km^{2} (12 sq mi) estate outside Paris. It was charitably donated by the family to the University of Paris in 1975.

There are two branches of the family connected to France. The first was the branch of James Mayer de Rothschild (1792–1868), known as "James", who established de Rothschild Frères in Paris; he married his niece Betty von Rothschild. Following the Napoleonic Wars, he played a major role in financing the construction of railways and mining businesses that helped make France an industrial power. By 1980, the Paris business employed about 2,000 people and had an annual turnover of 26 billion francs (€4.13 billion or $5 billion in the currency rates of 1980).

"No kings could afford this! It could only belong to a Rothschild."

— Wilhelm I, Emperor of Germany, on visiting Château de Ferrières.

The Paris business suffered a near-fatal blow in 1982, when the socialist government of François Mitterrand nationalised and renamed it Compagnie Européenne de Banque. Baron David de Rothschild, then 39, decided to stay and rebuild, creating a new entity named Rothschild & Cie Banque, with just three employees and €830,000 (US$1 million) in capital. In the 21st century, the Paris operation has 22 partners and accounts for a significant part of the global business. Ensuing generations of the Paris Rothschild family remained involved in the family business, becoming a major force in international investment banking. The Paris Rothschilds have since led the Thomson Financial League Tables in Investment Banking Merger and Acquisition deals in the UK, France and Italy.

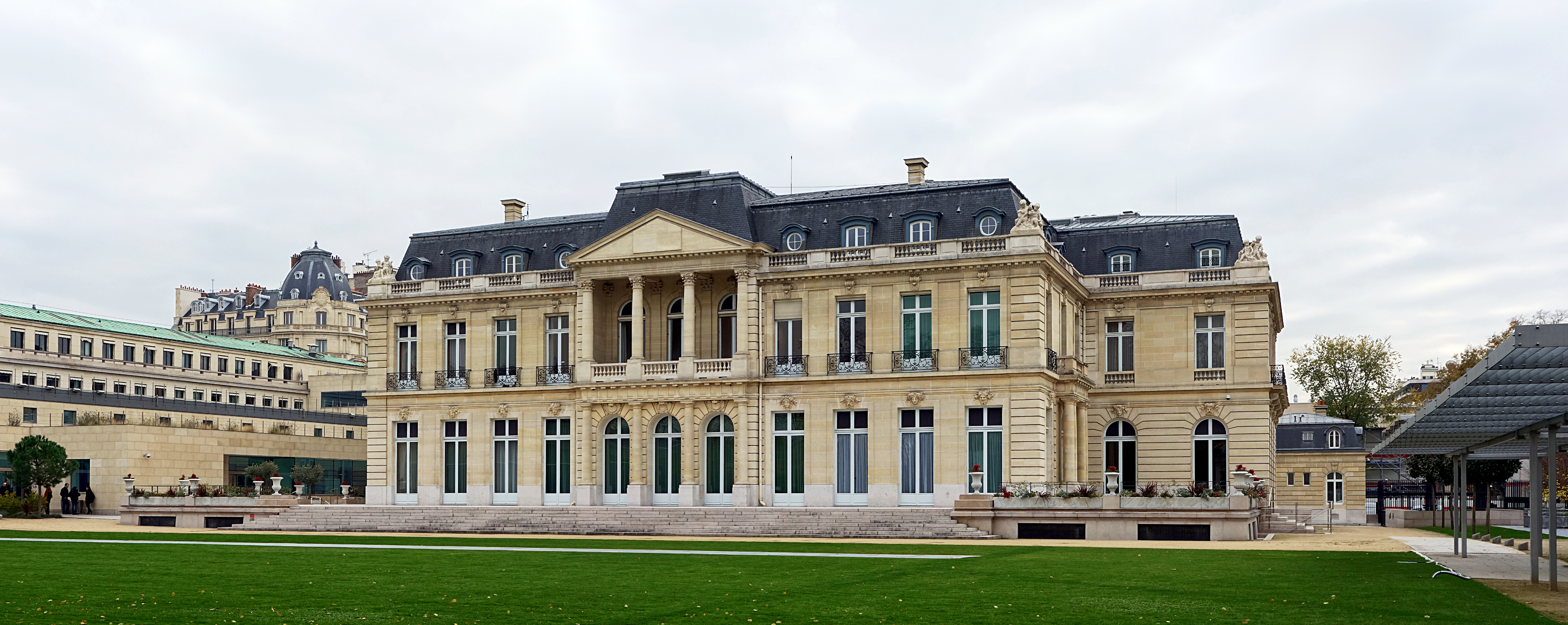
A former Rothschild family house, at the site of Château de la Muette, Paris. Built as a family residence by the secondary branch of the French Rothschild family, today it houses the headquarters of the OECD.

James Mayer de Rothschild's other son, Edmond James de Rothschild (1845–1934), was heavily engaged in philanthropy and the arts, and he was a leading proponent of Zionism. His grandson, Baron Edmond Adolphe de Rothschild, founded the LCF Rothschild Group in 1953, a private bank. In 1997, Baron Benjamin de Rothschild chaired the group. The group had €100 billion of assets in 2008 and owns many wine properties in France (Château Clarke, Château des Laurets), in Australia, and in South Africa. In 1961, the 35-year-old Edmond Adolphe de Rothschild purchased the company Club Med, after he had visited a resort and enjoyed his stay. His interest in Club Med was sold off by the 1990s. In 1973, he bought out the Bank of California, selling his interests in 1984 before it was sold to Mitsubishi Bank in 1985.

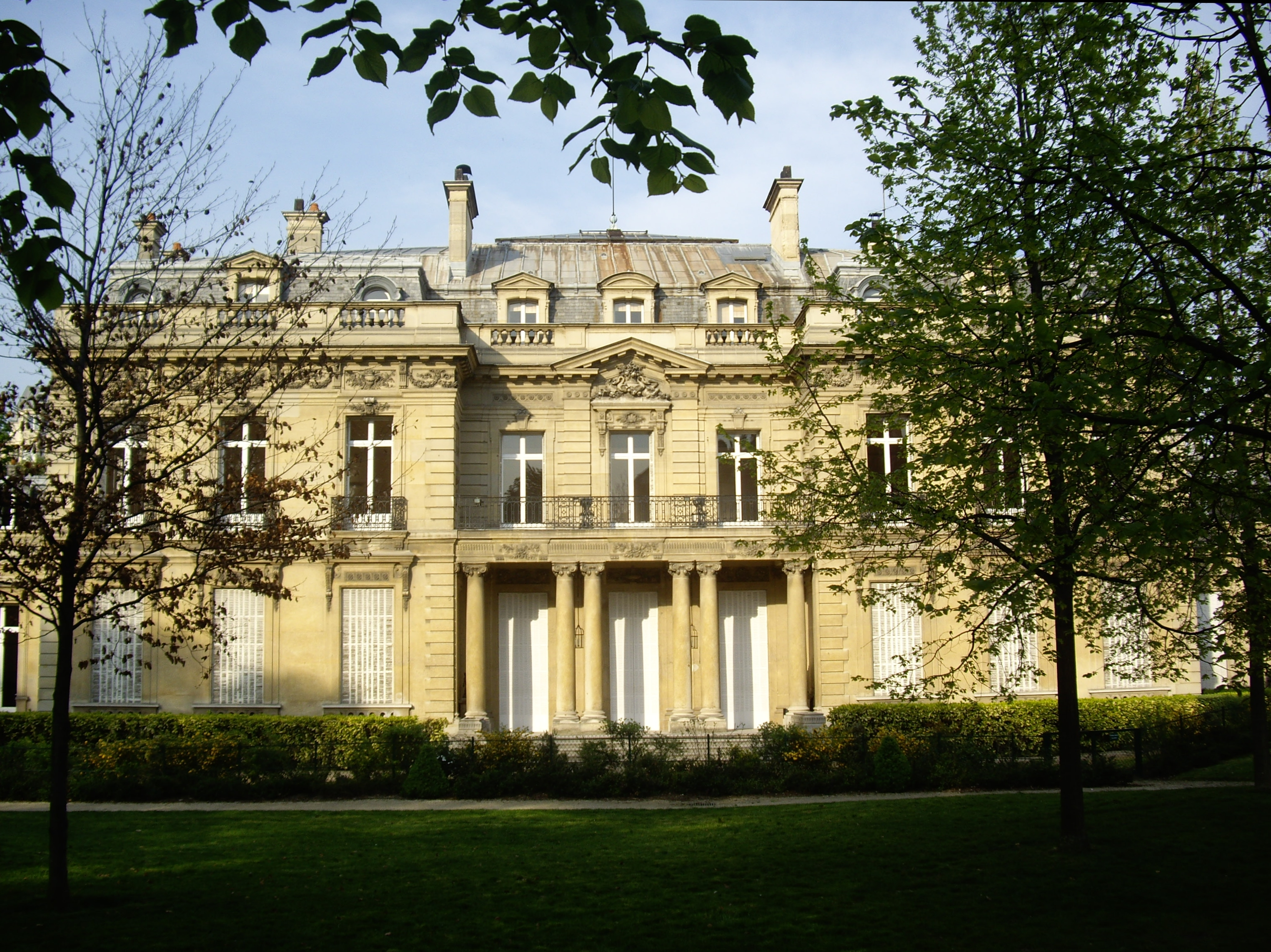
Hôtel Salomon de Rothschild, built in 1872 as a Paris townhouse for Salomon James de Rothschild

The second French branch was founded by Nathaniel de Rothschild (1812–1870). Born in London, he was the fourth child of the founder of the British branch of the family, Nathan Mayer Rothschild (1777–1836). In 1850, Nathaniel Rothschild moved to Paris to work with his uncle James Mayer Rothschild. In 1853, Nathaniel acquired Château Brane Mouton, a vineyard in Pauillac in the Gironde département. Nathaniel Rothschild renamed the estate Château Mouton Rothschild, and it would become one of the best-known labels in the world. In 1868, Nathaniel's uncle, James Mayer de Rothschild, acquired the neighbouring Château Lafite vineyard.

=== Austrian branch ===
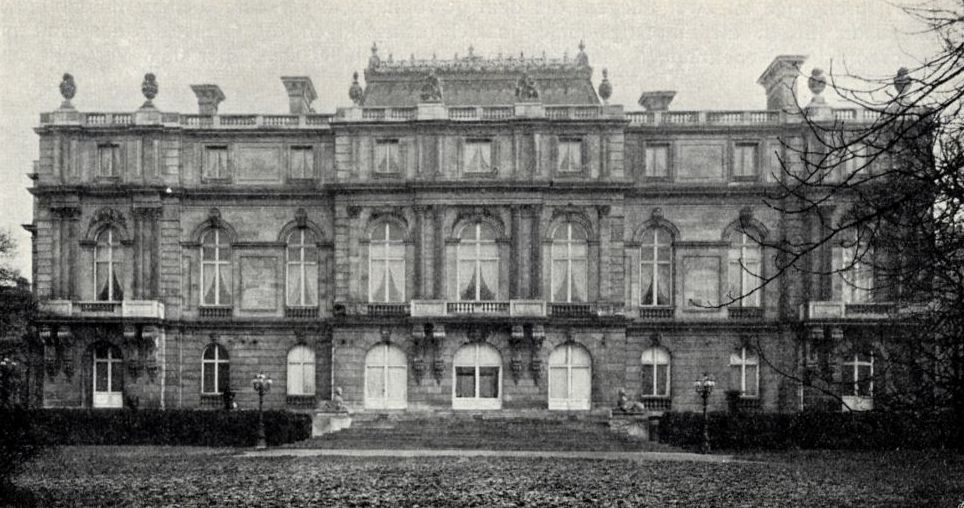
Palace of Baron Albert von Rothschild in Vienna.

In Vienna, Salomon Mayer Rothschild established a bank in the 1820s and the Austrian family amassed vast wealth and a prominent position. During the 19th century, their main business rivals were the Macedo-Romanian Sina family. The crash of 1929 brought problems, and Baron Louis von Schwartz Rothschild attempted to shore up the Creditanstalt, Austria's largest bank, to prevent its collapse. Nevertheless, during the Second World War they had to surrender their bank to the Nazis and flee the country. Their Rothschild palaces, a collection of vast palaces in Vienna built and owned by the family, were confiscated, plundered and destroyed by the Nazis. The palaces were famous for their sheer size and for their huge collections of paintings, armour, tapestries and statues (some of which were restored to the Rothschilds by the Austrian government in 1999). All family members escaped the Holocaust, with some of them moving to the United States and returning to Europe only after the war. In 1999, the government of Austria agreed to return to the Rothschild family some 250 art treasures looted by the Nazis and absorbed into state museums after the war.

=== Neapolitan branch ===
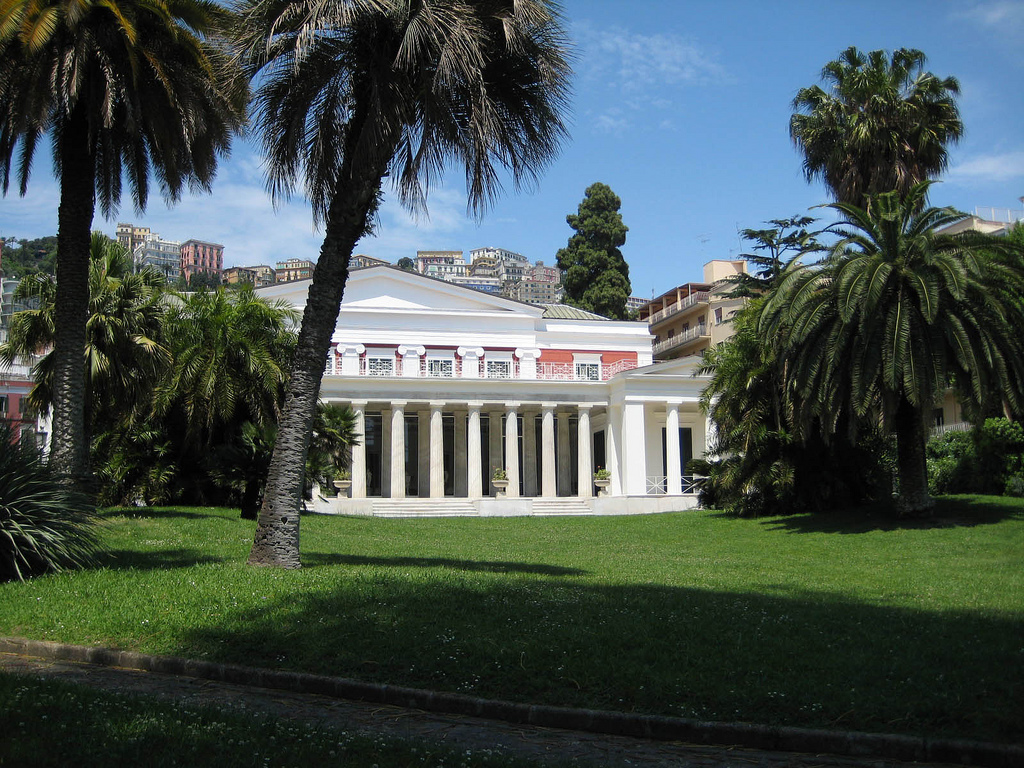
Villa Pignatelli, Naples, with views onto Mount Vesuvius

The C M de Rothschild & Figli bank arranged substantial loans to the Papal States and to various Kings of Naples, as well as the Duchy of Parma and the Grand Duchy of Tuscany. However, in the 1830s, Naples followed Spain with a gradual shift away from conventional bond issues that began to affect the bank's growth and profitability. The Unification of Italy in 1861, with the ensuing decline of the Italian aristocracy who had been the Rothschilds' primary clients, eventually brought about the closure of their Naples bank, due to a forecasted decline in the sustainability of the business over the long term. However, in the early 19th century, the Rothschild family of Naples built up close relations with the Holy See, and the association between the family and the Vatican continued into the 20th century.

In 1832, when Pope Gregory XVI was seen meeting Carl von Rothschild to arrange the 1832 Rothschild loan to the Holy See (for £400,000, worth €43,000,000 in 2014), observers were shocked that Rothschild was not required to kiss the Pope's feet, as was then required for all other visitors to the Pope, including monarchs. The 1906 Jewish Encyclopedia described the Rothschilds as "the guardians of the papal treasure".

== Jewish identity and positions on Zionism ==
Support for Zionism within the Rothschild family was not uniform across its branches. Many Rothschilds were supporters of Zionism, while other members of the family opposed it. Within the French branch of the family, after the death of James Jacob de Rothschild in 1868, his eldest son Alphonse Rothschild took over the management of the family bank and became active in supporting Eretz Israel.

Another influential supporter was Baron Edmond James de Rothschild, Alphonse's younger brother, known in Israel simply as "the Baron Rothschild" or "the Benefactor" (Hebrew: הנדיב, romanized: HaNadiv). Edmond financed some of the first Jewish agricultural colonies in the late 19th and early 20th centuries, which included being a patron for the first permanent settlement in Palestine at Rishon-LeZion (1882), and also provided funds for the establishment of Petah Tikva as a permanent settlement (1883). Overall, he bought from Ottoman landlords 2–3% of the land. (Note: The PICA obtained about 450–550 km^{2} (170–210 sq mi) of land in Palestine, out of about 1,850 km^{2} (710 sq mi) (7% of the area Mandatory Palestine) that were Jewish-owned by 1947. Today's Israel proper, excluding the West Bank, Gaza, Golan and East Jerusalem, is about 21,000 km^{2} (8,100 sq mi), but the Mandatory Palestine was larger.) After Baron de Hirsch died in 1896, the Hirsch-founded Jewish Colonisation Association (ICA) started supporting the settlement of Palestine (1896), and Baron Rothschild took an active role in the organisation and transferred his Palestinian land holdings as well as 15 million francs to it. In 1924, he reorganised the Palestinian branch of the ICA into the Palestine Jewish Colonisation Association (PICA), which acquired more than 125,000 acres (50,586 ha) of land and set up business ventures. In Tel Aviv, the Rothschild Boulevard is named after him, as are a number of localities throughout Israel which he assisted in founding, including Metulla, Zikhron Ya'akov, Rishon Lezion and Rosh Pina. A park in Boulogne-Billancourt, Paris, the Parc Edmond de Rothschild (Edmond de Rothschild Park), is also named after its founder.

Other members of the family, including Walter Rothschild, 2nd Baron Rothschild, were also supportive of Zionism. In Britain, Lord Walter Rothschild played a significant political role as a leading member of the Zionist Federation and served as an intermediary between the British government and Zionist leaders such as Chaim Weizmann, and was the addressee of the 1917 Balfour Declaration to the Zionist Federation, a letter which committed the British government to the establishment in Palestine of a national home for the Jewish people. His nephew, Victor, Lord Rothschild was against granting asylum or helping Jewish refugees in 1938. (Note: The Independent reported that he "shocked an audience by saying that in spite of 'the slow murder of 600,000 people' on the continent 'we probably all agree that there is something unsatisfactory in refugees encroaching on the privacy of our country, even for relatively short periods of time.'")

The Rothschild family archives show that during the 1870s, the family contributed nearly 500,000 francs per year on behalf of Eastern Jewry to the Alliance Israélite Universelle. The Rothschilds also played a significant part in the funding of Israel's governmental infrastructure. James A. de Rothschild financed the Knesset building as a gift to the State of Israel, and the Supreme Court of Israel building was donated to Israel by Dorothy de Rothschild. Outside the President's Chamber is displayed the letter Dorothy de Rothschild wrote to then-Prime Minister Shimon Peres expressing her intention to donate a new building for the Supreme Court. The Rothschilds also established the "Yad Hanadiv" philanthropic foundation in 1958. Interviewed by Haaretz in 2010, Baron Benjamin Rothschild, who was a Swiss-based member of the banking family, said that he supported the Israeli–Palestinian peace process: "I understand that it is a complicated business, mainly because of the fanatics and extremists – and I am talking about both sides. I think you have fanatics in Israel. ... In general I am not in contact with politicians. I spoke once with Netanyahu. I met once with an Israeli finance minister, but the less I mingle with politicians the better I feel." Due to a dispute with the Israeli tax authorities, the baron refused to visit Israel. But his widow Ariane de Rothschild often visits Israel where she manages the Caesarea Foundation. She says: "It is insulting that the state [Israel] casts doubt on us. If there is a family that does not have to prove its commitment to Israel, it's ours."

=== Places in Israel named after Rothschild family members ===
Primarily due to the generosity and influence of Baron Edmond James de Rothschild, HaNadiv (the Benefactor), on the history of the Land of Israel and the State of Israel, a tradition exists of naming cities, towns and other settlements in Israel in honor of members of the Rothschild family. Six of these places are grouped in the same vicinity, on the Sharon plain, while the others are scattered throughout the country. They are, listed in order of founding:

- Zichron Ya'akov (Hebrew: Jacob's Memory), a town founded in 1882 and named after the Benefactor's father, James [Jacob] Mayer de Rothschild (1792–1868) from the Paris branch of the family;
- Mazkeret Batya (Hebrew: Remembrance of Batya), a local council near Tel Aviv, founded in 1883 and named after Betty von Rothschild (1805–1886), the Benefactor's mother;
- Bat Shlomo (Hebrew: Salomon's Daughter), a moshav near Rehovot, founded in 1889 and also named after the Baron's mother, who was the daughter of Salomon Mayer von Rothschild (1774–1855), the Benefactor's grandfather from the Vienna branch;
- Meir Shfeya (Hebrew: Mayer's Fields), a youth village near Zichron Ya'acov, founded as a moshava in 1891 and named after Amschel Mayer von Rothschild (1773–1855), the Benefactor's grandfather from the Frankfurt branch;
- Givat Ada (Hebrew: Ada's Hill), a town near Zichron Ya'acov, founded in 1903 and named after the Benefactor's wife Adelheid von Rothschild (1853–1935), who was also his cousin, from the Naples branch;
- Binyamina, a town near Zichron Ya'acov, founded in 1922 and named after Benefactor himself (Binyamina was officially merged with Givat Ada in 2003);
- Ashdot Ya'akov (Hebrew: Jacob's Rapids), a kibbutz just south of the Sea of Galilee, founded in 1924 and named after James Armand Edmond de Rothschild (1878–1957), son of the Benefactor;
- Pardes Hanna (Hebrew: Hannah's [Citrus] Orchard), a local council near Zichron Ya'acov, founded in 1929 and named after Hannah Primrose, Countess of Rosebery (née de Rothschild; 1851–1890), daughter of Mayer Anschel Rothschild;
- Shadmot Dvora (Hebrew: Deborah's Cultivated Fields), a moshav near Tiberias, founded in 1939 and named after Dorothy de Rothschild (1895–1988), who was James de Rothschild's wife and the Benefactor's daughter-in-law;
- Sde Eliezer (Hebrew: Eliezer's Field), a moshav in the Hula Valley, founded in 1950 and named after Robert Rothschild (1911–1998), a relative of the Benefactor from the French branch.

== Modern businesses, investments, and philanthropy ==
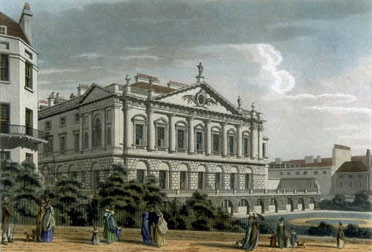
The family has fully restored Spencer House, St. James's Park, London.

Since the late 19th century, the family has taken a low-key public profile, donating many famous estates, as well as vast quantities of art, to charity, and generally eschewing conspicuous displays of wealth. Today, Rothschild businesses are on a smaller scale than they were throughout the 19th century, although they encompass a diverse range of fields, including real estate, financial services, mixed farming, energy, mining, winemaking and nonprofits.

=== Rothschild & Co ===
Since 2003, a group of Rothschild banks has been controlled by Rothschild Continuation Holdings, a Swiss-registered holding company (under the chairmanship of Baron David René de Rothschild). Rothschild Continuation Holdings is in turn controlled by Concordia BV, a Dutch-registered master holding company. Concordia BV is managed by Paris Orléans S.A., a French-registered holding company. Paris Orléans S.A. is ultimately controlled by Rothschild Concordia SAS, a Rothschild family holding company.

Rothschild & Cie Banque controls Rothschild banking businesses in France and continental Europe, while Rothschild Continuation Holdings AG controls a number of Rothschild banks elsewhere, including N M Rothschild & Sons in London. Twenty per cent of Rothschild Continuation Holdings AG was sold in 2005 to Jardine Strategic, which is a subsidiary of Jardine, Matheson & Co. of Hong Kong. In November 2008, Rabobank Group, the leading investment and private bank in the Netherlands, acquired 7.5% of Rothschild Continuation Holdings AG, and Rabobank and Rothschild entered into a co-operation agreement in the fields of mergers and acquisitions (M&A) advisory and equity capital markets advisory in the food and agribusiness sectors. It was believed that the move was intended to help Rothschild Continuation Holdings AG gain access to a wider capital pool, enlarging its presence in East Asian markets.

Paris Orléans S.A. is a financial holding company listed on Euronext Paris and controlled by the French and English branches of the Rothschild family. Paris Orléans is the flagship of the Rothschild banking group and controls the Rothschild Group's banking activities, including N M Rothschild & Sons and Rothschild & Cie Banque. It has over 2,000 employees. Directors of the company include Eric de Rothschild, Robert de Rothschild and Count Philippe de Nicolay. N M Rothschild & Sons, an English investment bank, does most of its business as an advisor for mergers and acquisitions. In 2004, the investment bank withdrew from the gold market, a commodity the Rothschild bankers had traded in for two centuries. In 2006, it ranked second in UK M&A with deals totalling $104.9 billion. In 2006, the bank recorded a pre-tax annual profit of £83.2 million with assets of £5.5 billion.

"Treat the stock exchange like a cold shower (quick in, quick out)."

—A traditional family maxim.

=== Edmond de Rothschild Group ===
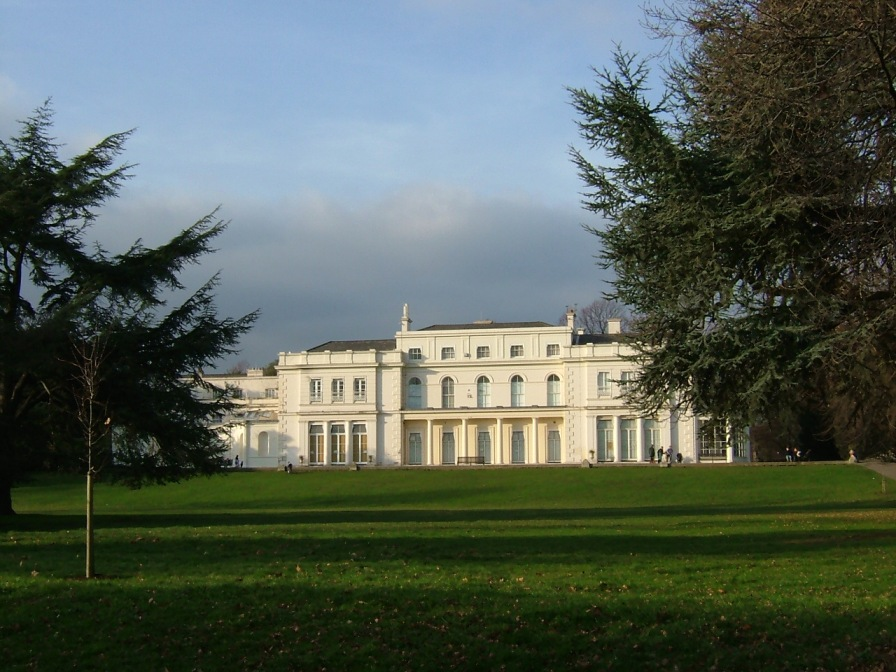
The Large Mansion at Gunnersbury Park, London

In 1953, one Swiss member of the family, Edmond Adolphe de Rothschild (1926–1997), founded the LCF Rothschild Group (now Edmond de Rothschild Group) which is based in Geneva and today extends to 15 countries across the world. Although this group is primarily a financial entity, specialising in asset management and private banking, its activities also cover mixed farming, luxury hotels and yacht racing. Edmond de Rothschild Group's committee is currently being chaired by Ariane de Rothschild.

In late 2010, Benjamin de Rothschild, the chairman at the time, said that the family was unaffected by the 2008 financial crisis, due to their conservative business practices: "We came through it well, because our investment managers did not want to put money into crazy things." He added that the Rothschilds were still a small-scale, traditional family business and took greater care over their clients' investments than American companies, adding: "The client knows we will not speculate with his money".

The Edmond de Rothschild Group includes these companies:

- Banque privée Edmond de Rothschild – Swiss private banking firm
- Compagnie Financière Edmond de Rothschild – French private bank
- La Compagnie Benjamin de Rothschild
- Cogifrance – Real estate
- Compagnie Vinicole Baron Edmond de Rothschild – wine making firm

=== RIT Capital Partners ===
In 1980, Jacob Rothschild, 4th Baron Rothschild resigned from N M Rothschild & Sons and took independent control of Rothschild Investment Trust (now RIT Capital Partners, a British investment trust), which reported assets of $3.4 billion in 2008. It is listed on the London Stock Exchange. Lord Rothschild is also one of the major investors behind BullionVault, a gold trading platform. In 2010, RIT Capital Partners stored a significant proportion of its assets in the form of physical gold. Other assets included oil and energy-related investments. In 2012, RIT Capital Partners announced it was to buy a 37 per cent stake in a Rockefeller family wealth advisory and asset management group. Commenting on the deal, David Rockefeller, a former patriarch of the Rockefeller family, said: "The connection between our two families remains very strong."

=== Investments ===
In 1991, Jacob Rothschild, 4th Baron Rothschild, founded J. Rothschild Assurance Group (now St. James's Place Wealth Management) with Sir Mark Weinberg. It is also listed on the London Stock Exchange. In 2001, the Rothschild mansion located at 18 Kensington Palace Gardens, London, was on sale for £85 million, at that time (2001) the most expensive residential property ever to go on sale in the world. It was built in marble, at 9,000 sq ft, with underground parking for 20 cars.

In December 2009, Jacob Rothschild, 4th Baron Rothschild, invested $200 million of his own money in a North Sea oil company. In January 2010, Nathaniel Rothschild, 5th Baron Rothschild, bought a substantial share of the Glencore mining and oil company's market capitalisation. He also bought a large share of the aluminium mining company United Company RUSAL. During the 19th century, the Rothschilds controlled the Rio Tinto mining corporation, and to this day, Rothschild and Rio Tinto maintain a close business relationship.

=== Wine ===
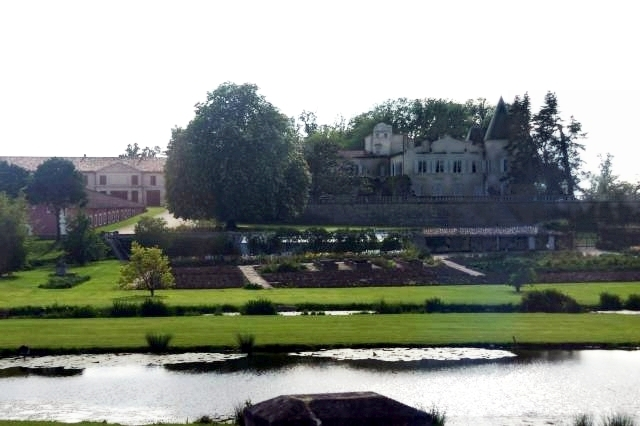
Château Lafite Rothschild, Bordeaux. Alongside Château Mouton Rothschild, it is perhaps the most prestigious of the many Rothschild wine estates.

The Rothschild family has been in the winemaking industry for 150 years. In 1853, Nathaniel de Rothschild purchased Château Brane-Mouton and renamed it Château Mouton Rothschild. In 1868, James Mayer de Rothschild purchased the neighbouring Château Lafite and renamed it Château Lafite Rothschild. In the 21st century, the Rothschild family owns many wine estates: their estates in France include Château Clarke, Château de Malengin, Château Clerc-Milon, Château d'Armailhac, Château Duhart-Milon, Château Lafite Rothschild, Château de Laversine, Château des Laurets, Château L'Évangile, Château Malmaison, Château de Montvillargenne, Château Mouton Rothschild, Château de la Muette, Château Rieussec and Château Rothschild d'Armainvilliers. They also own wine estates across North America, South America, South Africa and Australia.

Notably, Château Mouton Rothschild and Château Lafite Rothschild are classified as Premier Cru Classé—i.e., First Growth, the status referring to a classification of wines from the Bordeaux region of France. Saskia de Rothschild was named Chairwoman of Château Lafite Rothschild in 2018, succeeding her father, Éric de Rothschild. Château Mouton Rothschild was managed by Philippine de Rothschild until her death in 2014. It is now under the direction of her son Philippe Sereys de Rothschild.

=== Art and charity ===
The family once had one of the largest private art collections in the world, and a significant proportion of the art in the world's public museums consists of Rothschild donations which were sometimes, in the family tradition of discretion, donated anonymously. Hannah Rothschild was appointed in December 2014 as chair of the board of the National Gallery of London.

== List of financial holdings ==
The following is a list of businesses in which members of the Rothschild family have held a controlling or an otherwise significant interest.

- Asia Resource Minerals
- Banque Rothschild
- Bnito
- Brinco
- British South Africa Company
- Chemins de fer du Nord
- Club Med
- Creditanstalt
- De Beers
- The Economist Group
- Edmond de Rothschild Group
- Eramet
- Genel Energy
- Libération
- M. A. Rothschild & Söhne
- Opus One Winery
- Rio Tinto
- RIT Capital Partners
- Rothschild & Co
- Shell plc
- S. M. von Rothschild
- Sociedad Minera y Metalúrgica de Peñarroya
- St. James's Place plc
- Vítkovice Mining and Iron Corporation

== Cultural references ==
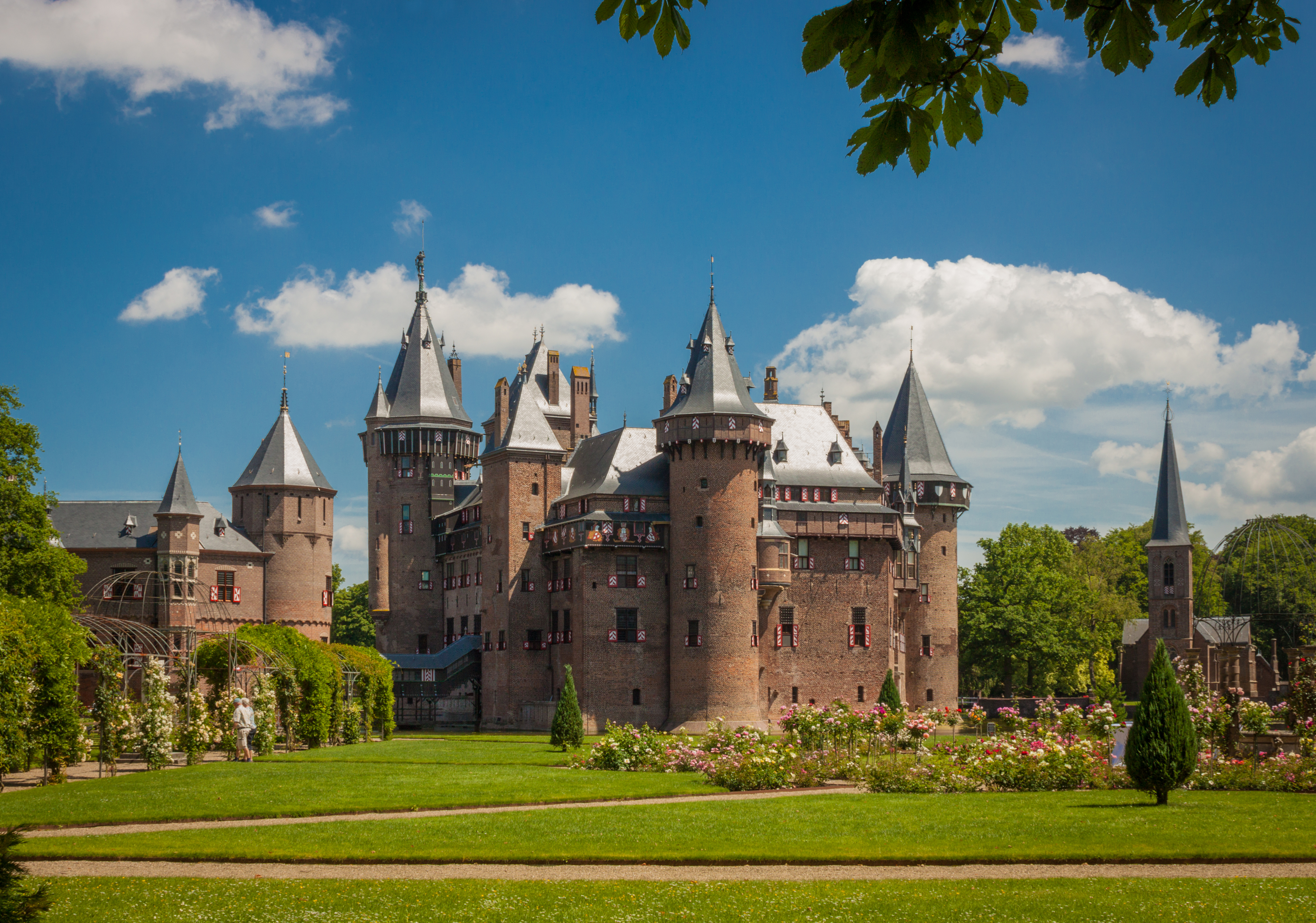
The neo-Gothic Castle de Haar

In the words of The Daily Telegraph: "This multinational banking family is a byword for wealth, power – and discretion... The Rothschild name has become synonymous with money and power to a degree that perhaps no other family has ever matched."

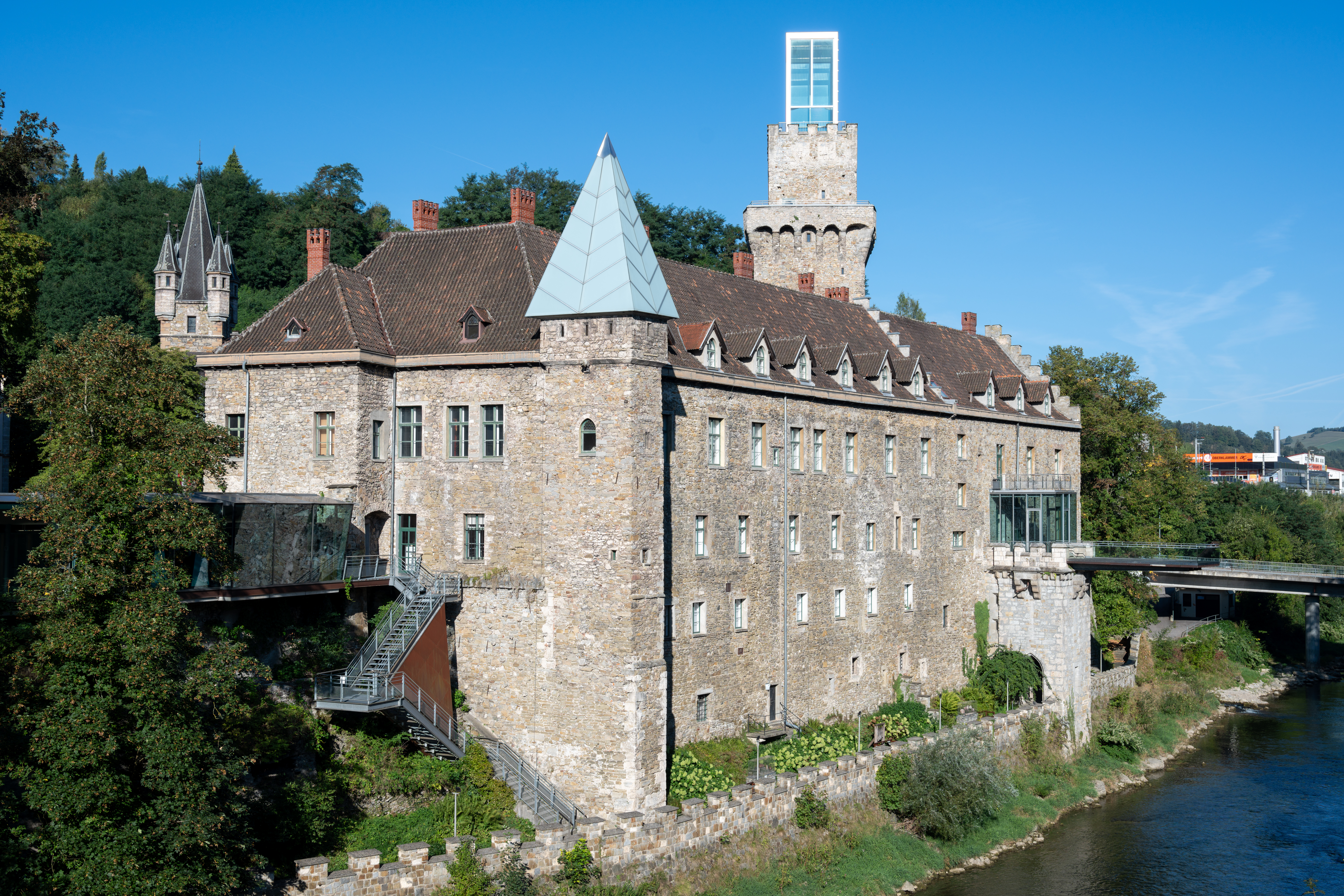
The neo-Gothic Rothschildschloss, Waidhofen

Writing of the Rockefeller and Rothschild families, Harry Mount writes: "That is what makes these two dynasties so exceptional – not just their dizzying wealth, but the fact that they have held on to it for so long: and not just the loot, but also their family companies."

The story of the Rothschild family has been featured in a number of films. The 1934 Hollywood film titled The House of Rothschild, starring George Arliss and Loretta Young, recounted the life of Mayer Amschel Rothschild and Nathan Mayer Rothschild (both played by Arliss). Excerpts from this film were incorporated into the Nazi propaganda film Der ewige Jude (The Eternal Jew) without the permission of the copyright holder. Another Nazi film, Die Rothschilds (also called Aktien auf Waterloo), was directed by Erich Waschneck in 1940. A Broadway musical entitled The Rothschilds, covering the history of the family up to 1818, was nominated for a Tony Award in 1971. Nathaniel Mayer ("Natty") Rothschild, 1st Baron Rothschild appears as a minor character in the historical-mystery novel Stone's Fall, by Iain Pears. Mayer Rothschild is featured in Diana Gabaldon's novel Voyager as a coin seller summoned to Le Havre by Jamie Fraser to appraise coins, prior to the establishment of the Rothschild dynasty, when Mayer is in his early 20s. The Rothschild name is mentioned by Aldous Huxley in his novel Brave New World, among many names of historically affluent persons, scientific innovators and others. The character, named Morgana Rothschild, played a relatively minor role in the story. The name Rothschild, used as a synonym for extreme wealth, inspired the song "If I Were a Rich Man", which is based on a song from the Tevye the Dairyman stories, written in Yiddish as Ven ikh bin Rotshild, meaning 'If I were a Rothschild'.

In France, the word "Rothschild" was throughout the 19th and 20th centuries a synonym for seemingly endless wealth, neo-Gothic styles, and epicurean glamour. The family has also lent its name to "le goût Rothschild," a very glamorous style of interior decoration whose elements include neo-Renaissance palaces, extravagant use of velvet and gilding, vast collections of armour and sculpture, a sense of Victorian horror vacui, and the highest masterworks of art. Le goût Rothschild has influenced designers such as Robert Denning, Yves Saint Laurent, Vincent Fourcade and others.

"Yes, my dear fellow, it all amounts to this: in order to do something first you must be something. We think Dante great, and he had a civilization of centuries behind him; the House of Rothschild is rich and it has required much more than one generation to attain such wealth. Such things all lie much deeper than one thinks."

— Johann Wolfgang Goethe, October 1828

== Conspiracy theories ==
Over more than two centuries, the Rothschild family has frequently been the subject of conspiracy theories. These theories take differing forms, such as claiming that the family controls the world's wealth and financial institutions, or that they have encouraged or discouraged wars between governments. Discussing this and similar views, the historian Niall Ferguson wrote:

Without wars, nineteenth-century states would have little need to issue bonds. As we have seen, however, wars tended to hit the price of existing bonds by increasing the risk that a debtor state would fail to meet its interest payments in the event of defeat and losses of territory. By the middle of the 19th century, the Rothschilds had evolved from traders into fund managers, carefully tending to their own vast portfolio of government bonds. Now having made their money, they stood to lose more than they gained from conflict. ... The Rothschilds had decided the outcome of the Napoleonic Wars by putting their financial weight behind Britain. Now they would ... sit on the sidelines.

Most conspiracy theories about the Rothschild family arise from antisemitic prejudice and various antisemitic tropes. (Note: Attributed to multiple sources:) Contemporary conspiracy theorist David Icke, for instance, equates the hidden conspiracy purported to be revealed in the hoax The Protocols of the Elders of Zion with what he calls "Rothschild Zionists".

== Prominent descendants of Mayer Amschel Rothschild ==
=== Prominent lineal descendants of Mayer Amschel Rothschild ===
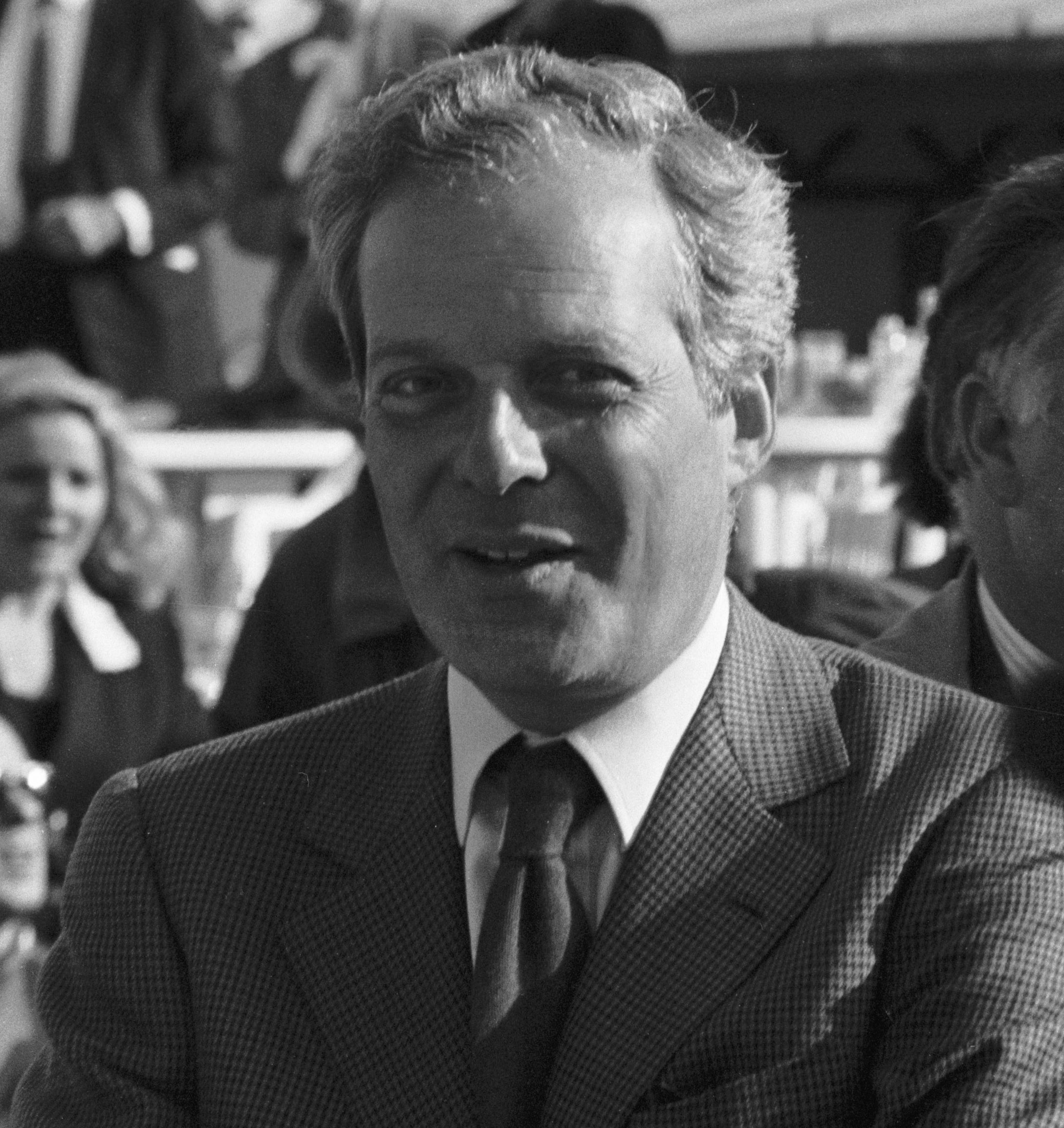
Baron David René de Rothschild, current French chairman of N M Rothschild & Sons and formerly of De Beers

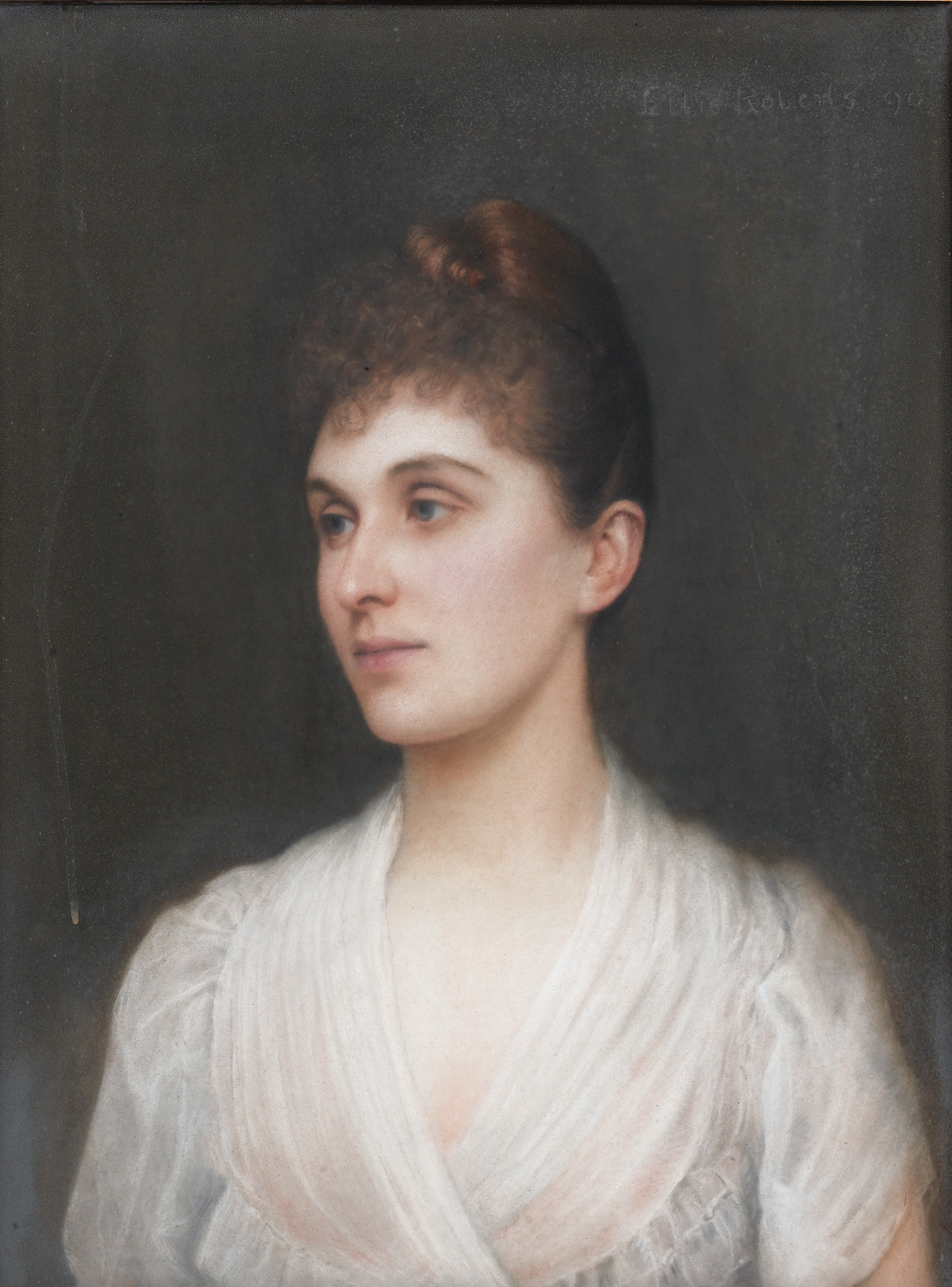
Bertha-Clara von Rothschild (Princess of Wagram) (Ellis William Roberts, 1890)

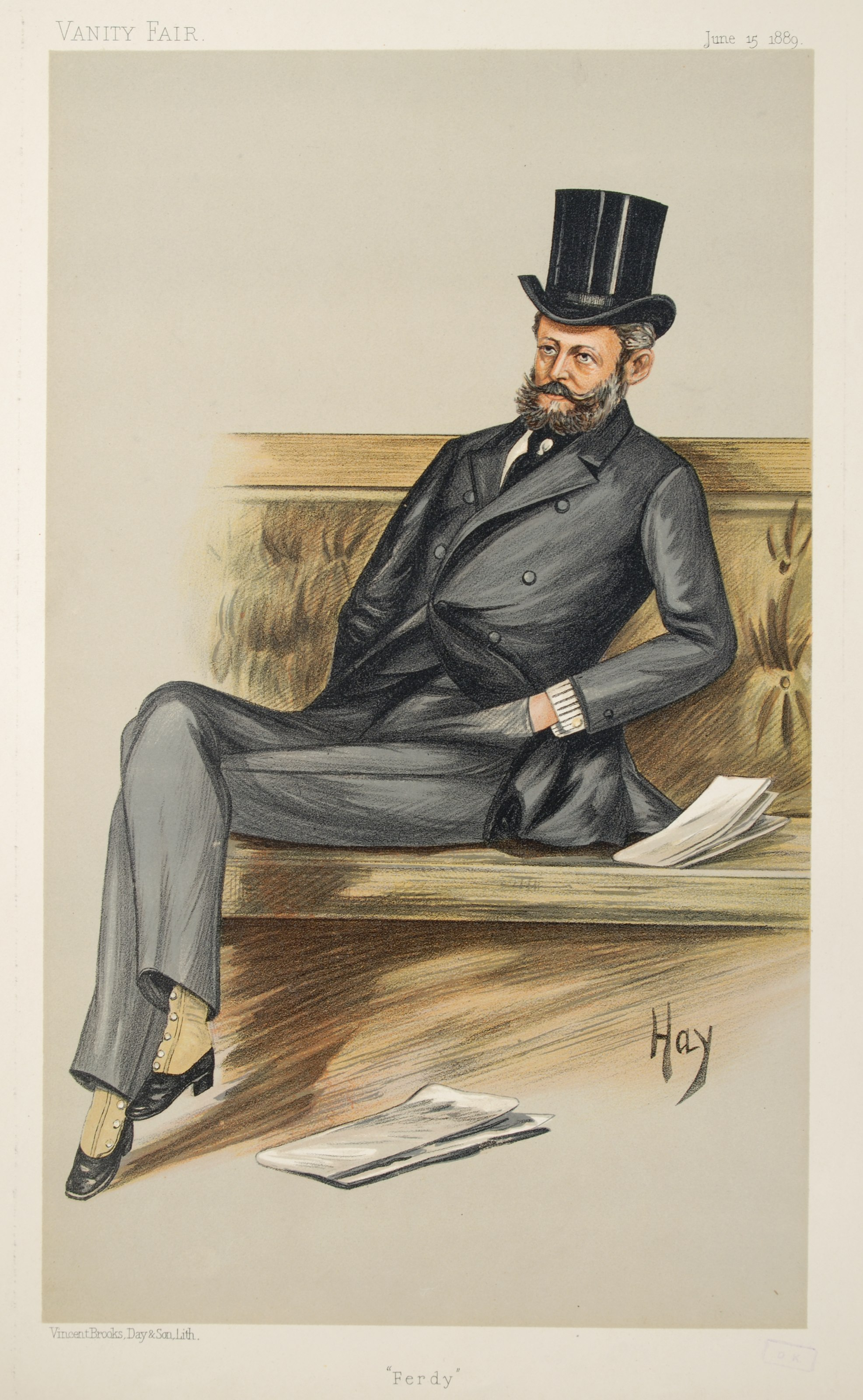
Baron Ferdinand de Rothschild, M.P. (1839–1898)

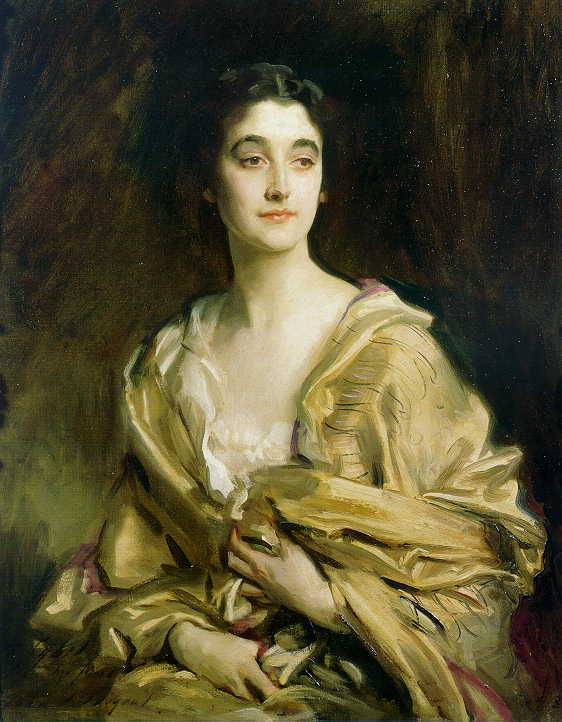
Sybil Cholmondeley, Marchioness of Cholmondeley (1894–1989), painted by John Singer Sargent

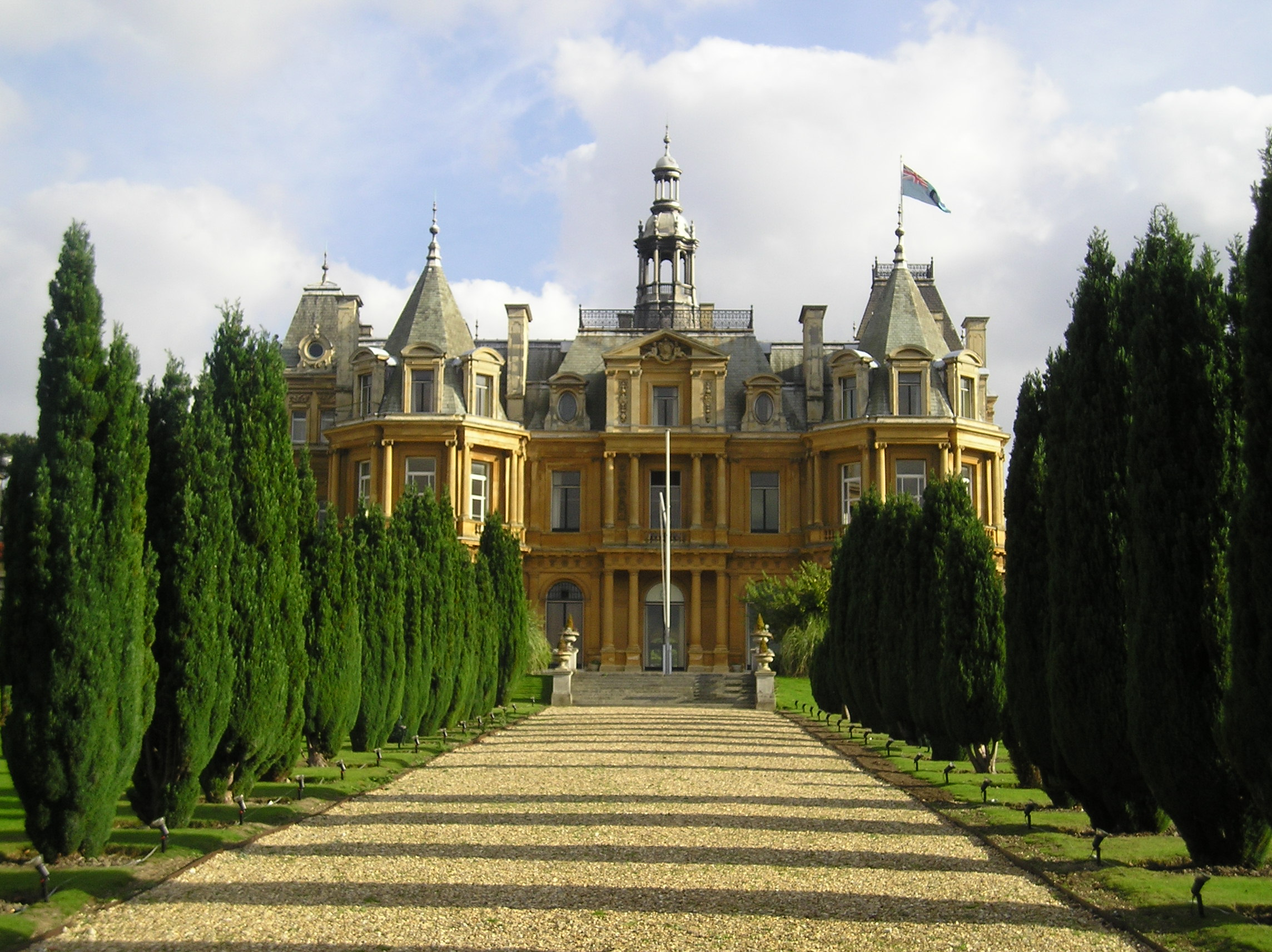
Halton House, a Rothschild family mansion in Buckinghamshire, England

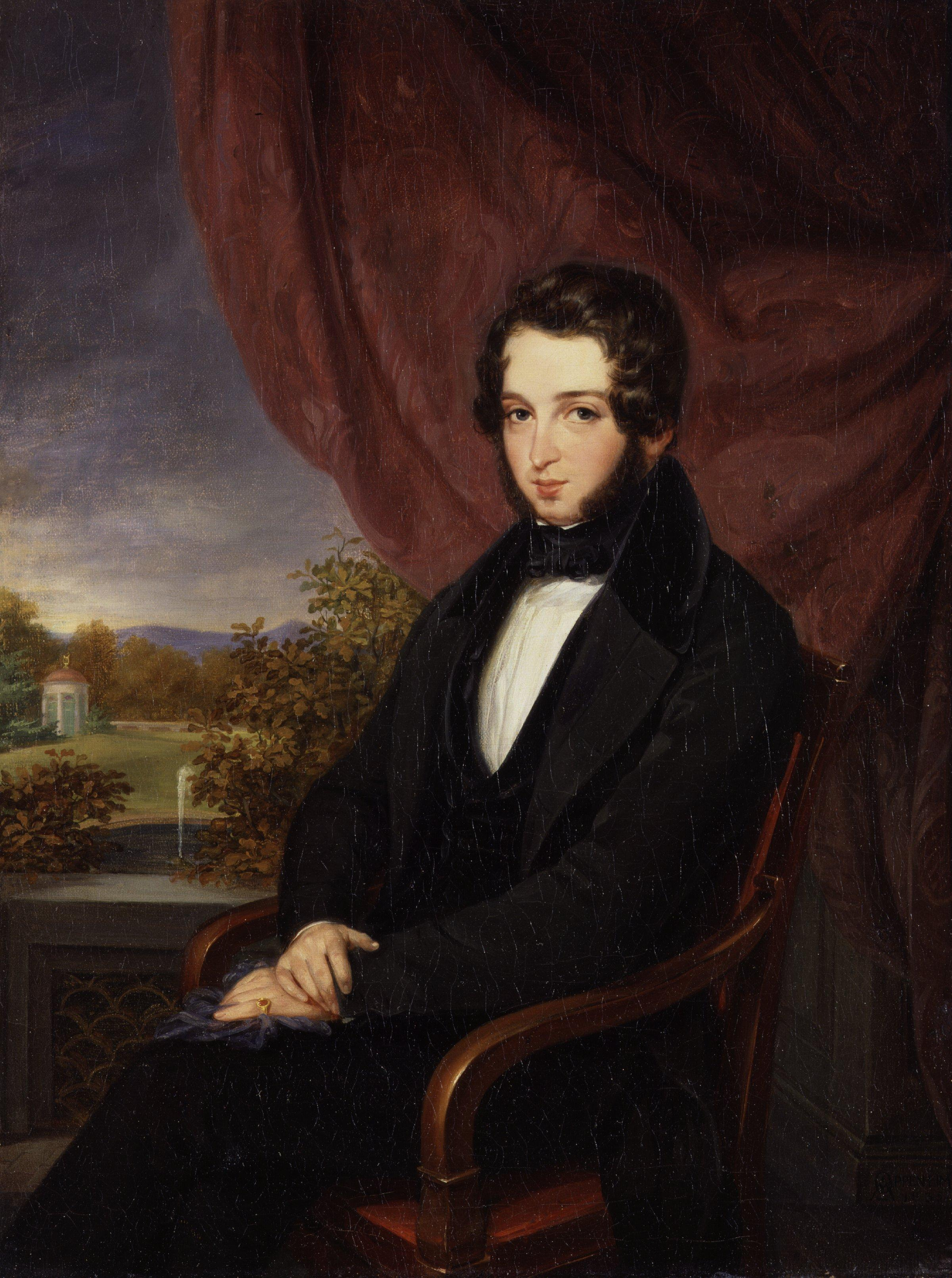
Lionel de Rothschild, whose colt Sir Bevys won the 1879 Epsom Derby

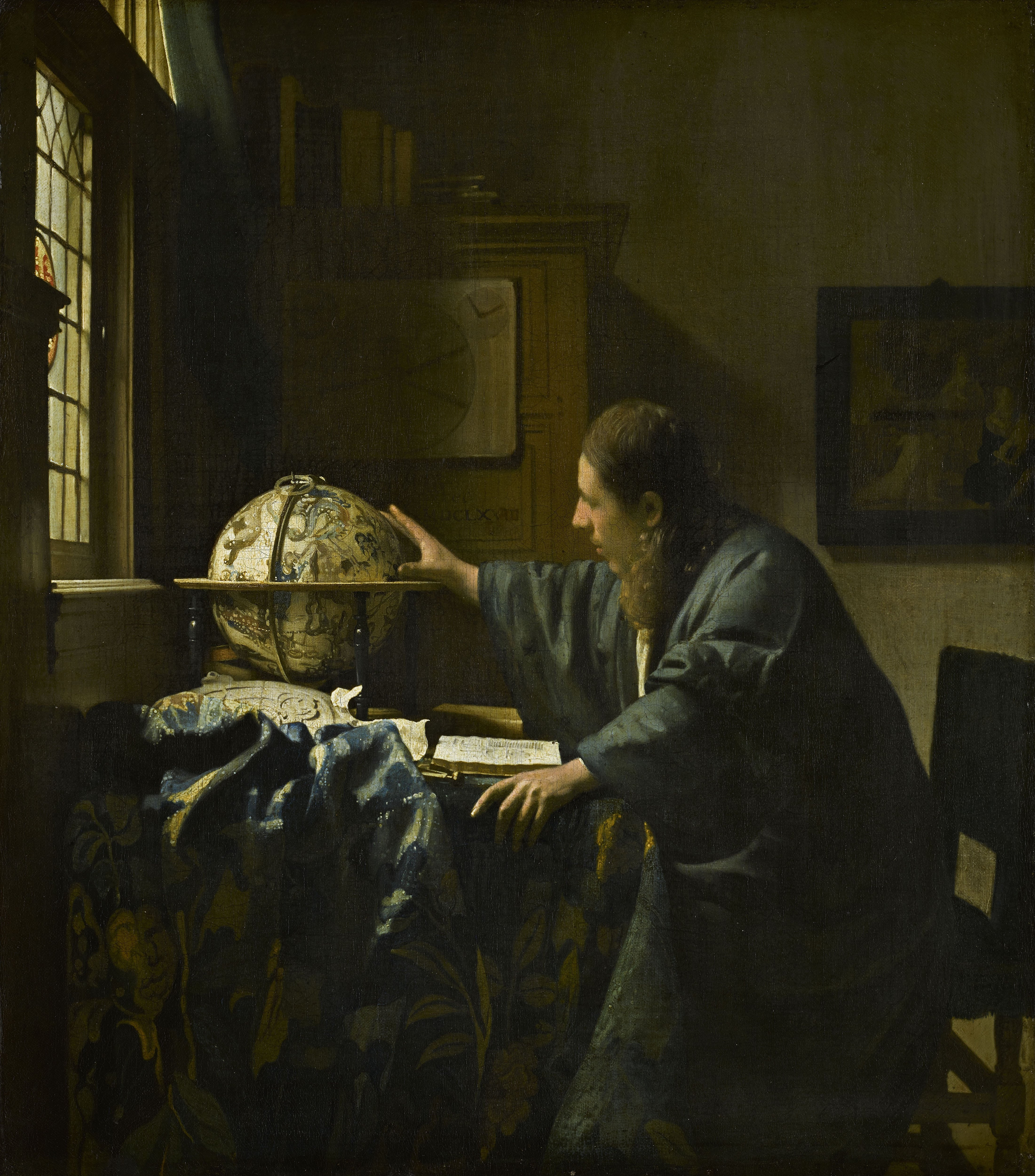
The Astronomer, by Johannes Vermeer given to the Louvre Museum by the Rothschild family in 1982

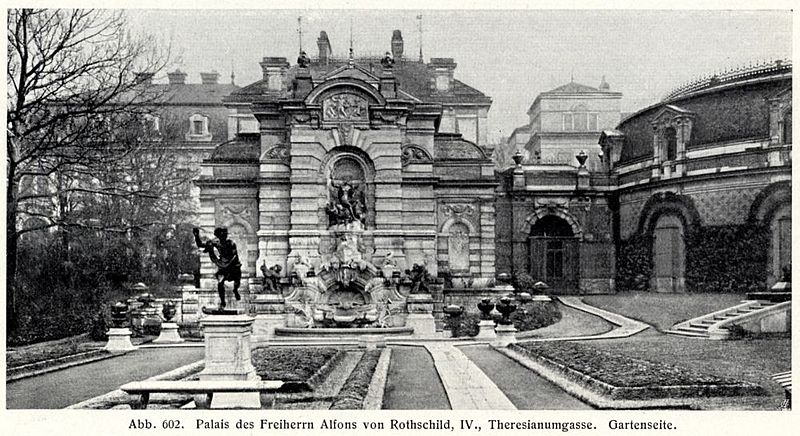
Palace Nathaniel Rothschild, Vienna

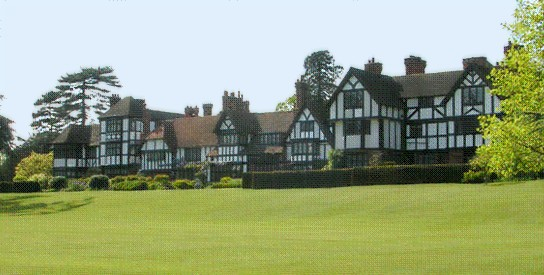
Ascott House, donated to charity by the family in 1947

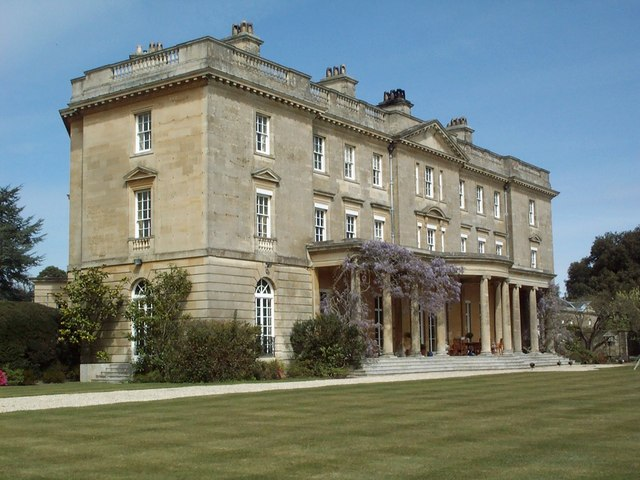
Exbury House, a Rothschild estate in England

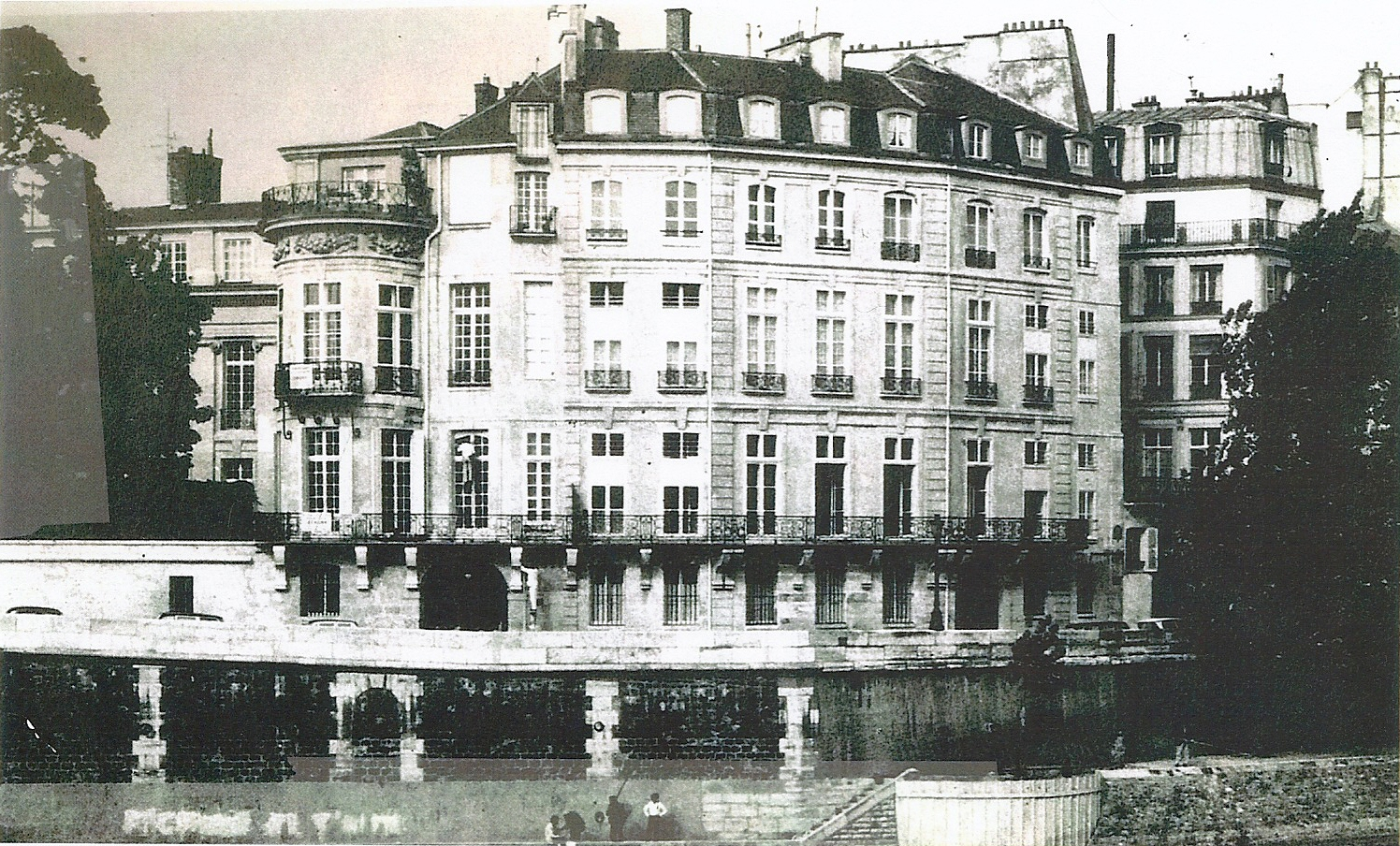
Hôtel Lambert, Paris

- Major Alexander Karet (1905–1976)
- Almina Herbert, Countess of Carnarvon (15 August 1876 – 8 May 1969)
- Alexandre Louis Philippe Marie Berthier, 4th Prince de Wagram (1883–1918), died fighting in the First World War
- Albert Salomon von Rothschild (1844–1911), former majority shareholder of Creditanstalt
- Alfred Charles de Rothschild (20 July 1842 – 31 January 1918)
- Alice Charlotte von Rothschild (1847–1922) close friend of Queen Victoria
- Aline Caroline de Rothschild (1867–1909), French socialite
- Baroness Afdera Franchetti (8 July 1931 – 20 March 2025), a former wife of Henry Fonda, from the noble Italian Jewish Franchetti family
- Baroness Alix Hermine Jeannette Schey de Koromla (1911–1982)
- Alphonse James de Rothschild (1827–1905)
- Amschel Mayor James Rothschild (1955–1996, Paris), patron of motor racing
- Annie Henrietta Yorke (1844–1926), temperance reformer and philanthropist; daughter of Sir Anthony de Rothschild, 1st Baronet
- Anthony Gustav de Rothschild (1887–1961), horse-breeder
- Anthony James de Rothschild (born 1977)
- Anselm von Rothschild (1803–1874), Austrian banker
- Sir Anthony de Rothschild, 1st Baronet (1810–1876)
- Antoine Armand Odelric Marie Henri de Gramont, 13th Duke of Gramont (born 1951)
- Alain de Rothschild (1910–1982)
- Benjamin de Rothschild (1963–2021)
- Béatrice Ephrussi de Rothschild (1864–1934)
- Bethsabée de Rothschild (1914–1999)
- Carl Mayer von Rothschild (1788–1855)
- Charlotte de Rothschild (1825–1899)
- Charlotte Henriette de Rothschild (born 1955), soprano
- Charlotte von Rothschild (1818–1884)
- Charles Rothschild (1877–1923), banker and entomologist
- Constance Flower (1843–1931), society hostess and philanthropist; daughter of Sir Anthony de Rothschild, 1st Baronet
- David Cholmondeley, 7th Marquess of Cholmondeley (born 1960), Lord Great Chamberlain of England
- David Mayer de Rothschild (born 1978), billionaire British adventurer and environmentalist
- David René de Rothschild (born 1942)
- Edmond Adolphe de Rothschild (1926–1997)
- Edouard Etienne de Rothschild (born 1957)
- Edouard Alphonse James de Rothschild (1868–1949), financier and polo player
- Edmond James de Rothschild (1845–1934)
- Edmund Leopold de Rothschild (1916–2009)
- Elie de Rothschild (1917–2007)
- Emma Rothschild (born 1948)
- Evelina de Rothschild (1839–1866)
- Evelyn Achille de Rothschild (1886–1917), died fighting for the British Army in the First World War
- Sir Evelyn de Rothschild (1931–2022), banker
- Baron Ferdinand de Rothschild, M.P. (1839–1898)
- Gustave Samuel de Rothschild (1829–1911)
- Guy de Rothschild (1909–2007)
- Hannah Primrose, Countess of Rosebery, née Hannah de Rothschild (1851–1890)
- Hannah Rothschild (born 1962), documentary filmmaker
- Henri James de Rothschild (1872–1946), playwright, grandson of Nathaniel de Rothschild
- Duke Hélie Marie Auguste Jacques Bertrand Philippe (1943), 10th Duke of Noailles
- Hugh Cholmondeley, 6th Marquess of Cholmondeley (1919–90), Lord Great Chamberlain of England
- James Armand de Rothschild (1878–1957)
- James Mayer Rothschild (1792–1868)
- Marie Angliviel de la Beaumelle (1963–2013)
- Neil Primrose, 7th Earl of Rosebery (1929–2024)
- Neil James Archibald Primrose (1882–1917), MP, killed fighting in the First World War
- Baroness Nica de Koenigswarter (née Baroness Pannonica Rothschild) (1913–1988), patron of bebop and jazz writer – often called the "Jazz Baroness"
- Baron Léon Lambert (1929–1987), Belgian art collector
- Leopold de Rothschild (1845–1917)
- Leopold David de Rothschild (1927–2012)
- Lionel Nathan Rothschild (1808–1879)
- Louis Nathaniel de Rothschild (1882–1955)
- Marie-Hélène de Rothschild (1927–1994), French socialite
- Maurice de Rothschild (1881–1957)
- Mayer Amschel de Rothschild (1818–1874)
- Miriam Louisa Rothschild (1908–2005), famous entomologist and zoologist
- Lionel Walter Rothschild, 2nd Baron Rothschild, of Tring in the County of Hertford (1868–1937)
- Nathaniel de Rothschild (1812–1870)
- Nathan Mayer Rothschild (1777–1836)
- Nathan Mayer Rothschild, 1st Baron Rothschild, of Tring in the County of Hertford (1840–1915)
- Nathaniel Charles Jacob Rothschild, 4th Baron Rothschild, of Tring in the County of Hertford (1936–2024)
- Nathaniel Robert de Rothschild (1946), French financier
- Nathaniel Mayer Victor Rothschild, 3rd Baron Rothschild, of Tring in the County of Hertford (1910–1990)
- Nathaniel Rothschild, 5th Baron Rothschild (born 1971), a co-chairman of Atticus Capital, a £20 billion hedge fund
- Nathaniel Anselm von Rothschild (1836–1905), Austrian socialite
- Sir Philip Sassoon, 3rd Baronet (1888–1939), British First Commissioner of Works and Under-Secretary of State for Air
- Count Philippe de Nicolay (born 1955), great-grandson of Salomon James de Rothschild, he is a director of the Rothschild group.
- Philippe de Rothschild (1902–1988), vintner, son of Henri James de Rothschild
- Philippine de Rothschild (1935–2014), vintner, daughter of Philippe
- Jacqueline Rebecca Louise de Rothschild (1911–2012), chess and tennis champion
- Harry Primrose, 6th Earl of Rosebery (1882–1974) Earl of Roseberry
- Raphael de Rothschild (1976–2000)
- Salomon James de Rothschild (1835–1864)
- Lady Serena Dunn Rothschild (1935–2019)
- Lady Sybil Grant (1879–1955), British writer
- Sybil Cholmondeley, Marchioness of Cholmondeley (1894–1989)
- Walter Rothschild, 2nd Baron Rothschild (1868–1937), zoologist
- Wilhelm Carl von Rothschild (1828–1901)

=== Prominent marriages into the family ===
- Maurice Ephrussi (1849–1916), of the Ephrussi family
- Ben Goldsmith (born 1980), son of financier James Goldsmith, of the Goldsmith family x Kate Emma Rothschild (born 1982)
- Anita Patience Guinness (1957), of the Guinness family x Amschel Mayor James Rothschild
- Abraham Oppenheim (1804–1878), of the Oppenheim Family x Charlotte Beyfus (1811–1887)
- Aline Caroline de Rothschild (1867–1909) x Edward Sassoon (1856–1912), of the Sassoon family
- Carola Warburg Rothschild (1894–1987), philanthropist, born into the Warburg family
- Baron Eugène Daniel de Rothschild (1884–1976) x Countess Katherine "Kitty" von Schönborn-Buchheim (1885–1946, née Wolff)
- James Nathaniel Charles Léopold Rothschild, son of Henri James Nathaniel Charles Rothschild and Mathilde Sophie Henriette de Weisweiller, x 1923: Claude du Pont of the Du Pont family.
- Elisabeth Pelletier de Chambure (1902–1945), the only member of the Rothschild family to die in the Holocaust.
- Count François de Nicolay (1919–1963), of the House of Nicolay x Marie-Hélène Naila Stephanie Josina van Zuylen van Nyevelt
- Marguerite de Rothschild x 1878: Antoine Alfred Agénor, 11th Duc de Gramont (1851–1921),
- Dorothy de Rothschild (1895–1988), on her death she left the largest probated estate in Britain
- George Herbert, 5th Earl of Carnarvon x Almina Victoria Maria Alexandra Wombwell, the illegitimate daughter of Alfred de Rothschild
- Pauline de Rothschild (1908–1976), fashion designer and translator of Elizabethan poetry
- Lady Irma Pauahi Wodehouse (1897), of the Wodehouse family
- Louis Philippe Marie Alexandre Berthier, 3rd Prince of Wagram (1836–1911)
- Countess Katharina Eleonore Veronika Irma Luise Henckel von Donnersmarck (1902–1965), actress x Baron Erich von Goldschmidt-Rothschild
- Amartya Sen (born 1933), Nobel Laureate, Indian economist and philosopher x Emma Georgina Rothschild of the Rothschild banking family of England.
- Jeanne de Rothschild (1908–2003), actress
- Nadine de Rothschild (born 1932), French actress and author
- Princess Sophie de Ligne (born 1957) x Philippe de Nicolay (born 1955), a director of the Rothschild group, and the great-grandson of Salomon James de Rothschild
- David René de Rothschild x Princess Olimpia Anna Aldobrandini, of the House of Borghese and the House of Bonaparte.
- Richard Francis Roger Yarde-Buller, 4th Baron Churston of Churston Ferrers and Lupton (1910–1991) x Olga Alice Muriel Rothschild
- Serena Dunn Rothschild (1935–2019), granddaughter of Sir James Hamet Dunn, 1st Baronet
- Lynn Forester de Rothschild (born 1954), businesswoman
- Baroness Rozsika Edle von Wertheimstein
- Baron Etienne van Zuylen van Nyevelt, of the House of Van Zuylen van Nyevelt x Baroness Hélène de Rothschild (1863–1947).
- Baron Elie Robert de Rothschild (1917–2007) x 1943: Lady Liliane Elisabeth Victoire Fould-Springer, great-aunt of actress Helena Bonham Carter
- James Rothschild x 2015: American heiress and socialite Nicky Hilton, the great-granddaughter of Hilton Hotels founder Conrad Hilton

== Coat of arms ==
Coat of arms of Rothschild family
Notes Coat of arms of the Rothschild family Adopted 1822 (granted by Emperor Francis I of Austria) Crest Crests: 1st, out of a ducal coronet Or a mullet of six points Or between two horns per fess alternately Or and Sable, Sable and Or; 2nd, issuant from a ducal coronet Or an eagle displayed Sable; 3rd, out of a ducal coronet Or three ostrich feathers, the centre one Argent and the exterior ones Azure Escutcheon Quarterly: 1st, Or an eagle displayed Sable langued Gules; 2nd, Azure issuing from the sinister flank an arm embowed proper grasping five arrows points downward Argent; 3rd, Azure issuing from the dexter flank an arm embowed proper grasping five arrows points downward Argent; 4th, Or a Lion rampant Gules; over all an inescutcheon Gules charged with an oval target with pointed center Argent per bend sinister Supporters Dexter: a lion rampant Or langued Gules; Sinister: a unicorn Argent langued Gules Motto Concordia, Integritas, Industria (Latin for "Unity, Integrity, Diligence")

== See also ==
- List of European Jewish nobility
- List of wealthiest families
- Ascott House
- Avenue Foch
- Cecil John Rhodes
- Château de Montvillargenne
- Château de Pregny
- Château Lafite Rothschild
- Château Mouton Rothschild
- De Beers
- Eramet
- Genealogy of the Rothschild family
- Goût Rothschild
- Hôtel de Marigny
- Hôtel Salomon de Rothschild
- Hôtel Lambert
- The House of Rothschild (1934 film), addresses Rothschild roles in the Napoleonic era
- Imerys
- Kadoorie family
- Old money
- Palais Rothschild
- Rockefeller family
- Rothschild Island
- Rothschild (Fabergé egg)
- Rothschild properties in and around Buckinghamshire
- Rio Tinto Mining Group
- Sassoon family
- Vaux-de-Cernay Abbey
- Warburg family
