= Arthur de Rothschild =

Member of the Rothschild family (1851–1903)

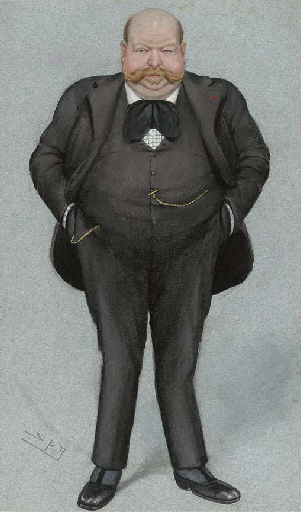
- "Eros" de Rothschild as caricatured in Vanity Fair, August 1900
- Born: 28 March 1851; Paris, France
- Died: 10 December 1903 (aged 52); Monte Carlo, Monaco
- Known for: Chevalier de la Légion d'honneur (1871)
- Parent(s): Nathaniel de Rothschild and Charlotte de Rothschild

Baron Arthur de Rothschild (28 March 1851 – 10 December 1903) was part of the French branch of the prominent Rothschild family. He was the son of Nathaniel de Rothschild and Charlotte de Rothschild (née de Rothschild). Being born in France to British parents he was an English citizen but obtained French nationality in 1872. He was a prominent philatelist and published a book on the subject. He also collected rare tapestries He was also interested in yachting and provided prize money for the America's Cup. He died of heart failure in his armchair in Monte Carlo at the age of 53. After his death important paintings were given to the Louvre and a large collection of old rings to the Musée de Cluny.
