= Waltz in C-sharp minor, Op. 64, No. 2 (Chopin) =

Composition for piano by Frédéric Chopin

Waltz No. 2, Op. 64
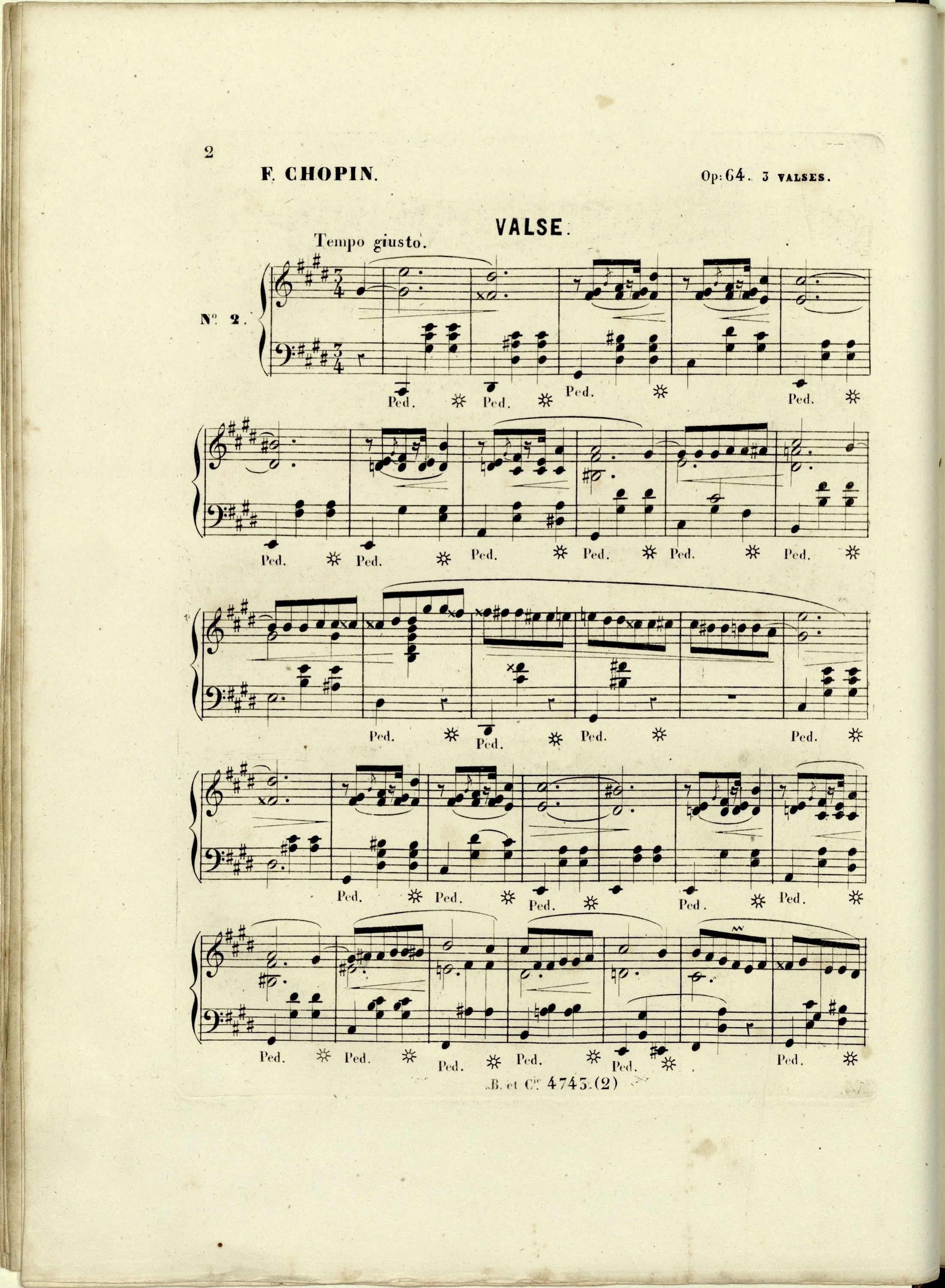
- Opening page of the first edition, published in Paris by Brandus et Cie, 1847
- Native name: Valse No. 2
- Key: C♯ minor
- Opus: 64
- Genre: waltz
- Composed: 1846–47
- Dedication: Madame Nathaniel de Rothschild
- Published: 1847
- Publisher: Paris: Brandus et Cie

Waltz in C♯ minor performed by Luke Faulkner

The Waltz in C♯ minor, Op. 64, No. 2 is a piano waltz composed by Frédéric Chopin in 1846–47, the second of the three waltzes of his Opus 64, and the companion to the "Minute Waltz" (Op. 64, No. 1). Chopin dedicated it to Madame Nathaniel de Rothschild.

It consists of three main themes:

- Theme A tempo giusto chordal with a walking pace feel;
- Theme B più mosso (faster) — theme stated in running eighth notes, a diatonic progression of eight bars forming two periods of sixteen bars, with all harmony in the left hand.
- Theme C più lento (slower) — a sostenuto in the parallel key of C♯ major (D♭ major, enharmonic equivalent to C♯ major). Besides the slower general pace, the irregular melody is in quarter notes except for a few flourishes in eighth notes, giving this section the quality of an interlude before the dramatic restatement of Theme B.

The overall layout of the piece is A B C B A B. While in rondo form, it still resembles the typical ternary structure of waltzes (AB CB AB). In an orchestrated version, it forms part of the ballet Les Sylphides.
