= Nathaniel de Rothschild =

British banker and winemaker (1812–1870)

- Born: 2 July 1812; London, England
- Died: 19 February 1870 (aged 57); Paris, France
- Occupations: Businessman, winemaker
- Spouse: Charlotte de Rothschild (m. 1842)
- Children: Nathalie de Rothschild (b. 1843); James Edouard de Rothschild (b. 1844); Mayer Albert de Rothschild (b. 1846); Arthur de Rothschild (b. 1851)
- Parent(s): Nathan Mayer Rothschild; Hannah W. Cohen
- Relatives: James Mayer Rothschild (uncle and later father-in-law)

Nathaniel de Rothschild (1812–1870), was a businessman, banker and winemaker. He established the Château Mouton Rothschild.

== Early life ==
Nathaniel de Rothschild was born on 2 July 1812 in London. He was the fourth child of Nathan Mayer Rothschild (1777–1836) and Hannah W. Cohen (1783–1850).

He was a member of the Rothschild banking family of England, closely connected to the Rothschild banking family of France. While he was in his thirties, he was injured in a hunting accident, after which he was rarely seen in public.

== Career ==
He moved to Paris, France in 1850 to work in the banking business owned by his uncle, James Mayer Rothschild (1792–1868).

In 1853, he acquired the Château Brane Mouton, a vineyard in Pauillac in the Gironde département from a Paris banker named Thuret who had previously bought it from Baron Hector de Branne in 1830. Rothschild paid 1,175,000 francs for Brane-Mouton's 65 acres (263,000 m^{2}) of vineyards and renamed the estate, Château Mouton Rothschild. It would become one of the world's best known winemakers.

In 1868, his uncle James acquired the neighboring Château Lafite vineyard. A prestigious first growth (premier cru) property more than three times the size of Chateau Mouton, it created a family rivalry. In the Bordeaux Wine Official Classification of 1855, Château Mouton was ranked second, something that upset its owner a great deal. In response, he composed the motto: Premier ne puis, second ne daigne, Mouton suis. ("First I cannot be, second I do not choose to be, Mouton I am."), a hint on the apocryphal motto of the House of Rohan.

== Personal life ==
In 1842, he married Charlotte de Rothschild (1825–1899), the only daughter of his uncle James Mayer Rothschild and his first cousin Betty von Rothschild. They had the following children:

- Nathalie de Rothschild (1843–1843)
- James Edouard de Rothschild (1844–1881), married Laura Thérèse von Rothschild (m. 1871)
- Mayer Albert de Rothschild (1846–1850)
- Arthur de Rothschild (1851–1903)

In 1856, Nathaniel and his wife purchased the property at 33 Rue du Faubourg Saint-Honoré in Paris from Denis, duc Decrès. At the time it was rented to the Russian Embassy but when the lease ran out in 1864, he renovated the building and made it his city residence. Passed down to his son Arthur de Rothschild, he sold it in 1918 to the Cercle de l'Union interalliée. In 1878, Nathaniel bought the Abbaye des Vaux de Cernay in Cernay-la-Ville in the Vallée de Chevreuse, at the time only a ruins of a Cistercian abbey built in 1118. He and his wife undertook extensive restoration work and new construction to turn the lakeside property into a luxurious country home.

The property of Château Mouton Rothschild was passed down to his son James Edouard and through him, to his great grandson Philippe de Rothschild.

== Death and legacy ==
He died on 19 February 1870 in Paris, France.

After his death, his children and grandchildren showed little enthusiasm for the wine business. It would be 118 years later that Château Mouton, under the leadership of Nat's great-grandson Philippe de Rothschild (1902–88), became the only French vineyard to ever achieve reclassification to First Growth.
