= Charlotte de Rothschild =

French painter (1825–1899)

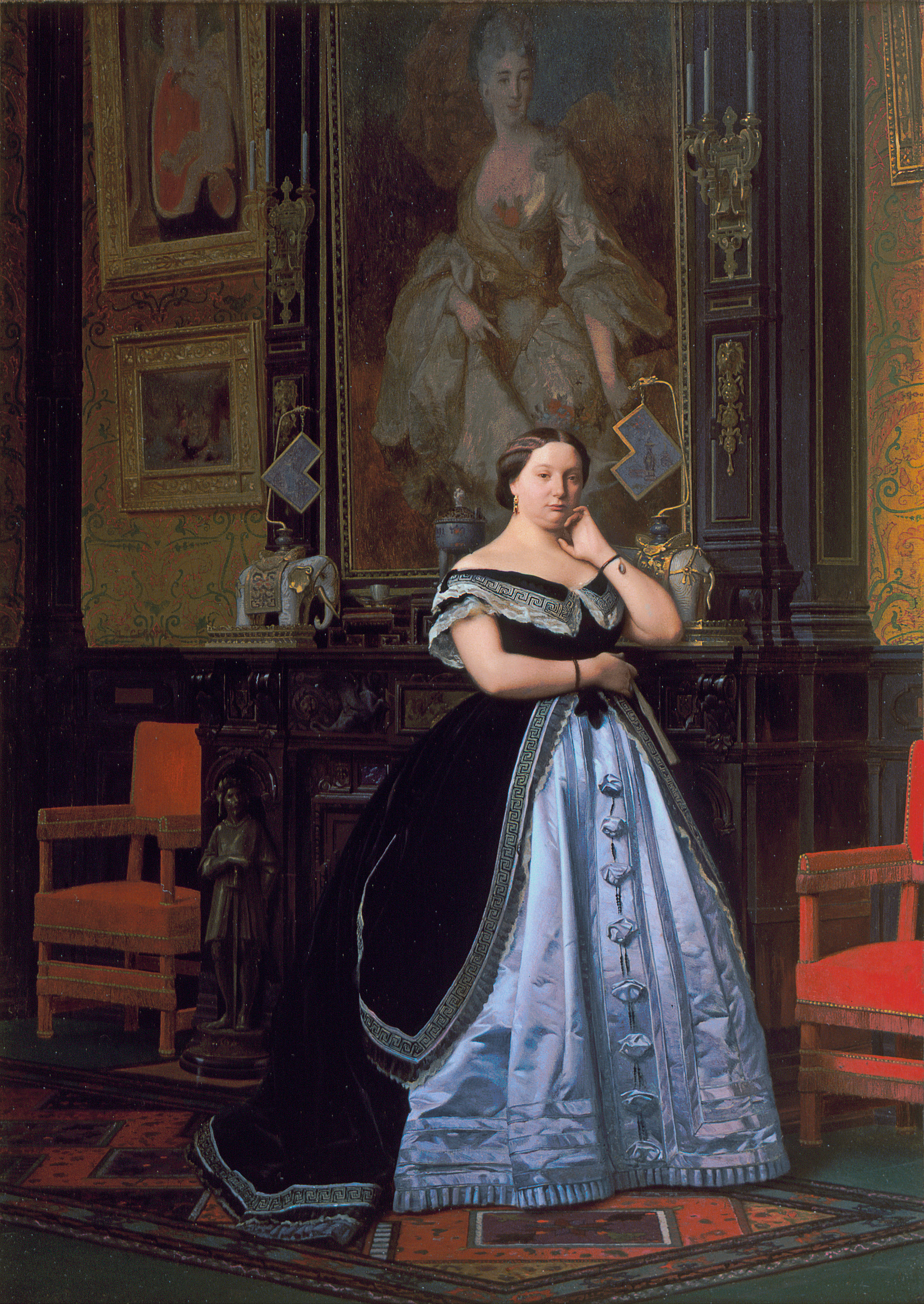
- 1866 Portrait of the Baroness Charlotte de Rothschild
- Born: 6 May 1825; Paris, France
- Died: 20 July 1899 (aged 74); Paris, France
- Spouse: Nathaniel de Rothschild (m. 1842)
- Children: Nathalie de Rothschild (b. 1843); Nathan James Edouard de Rothschild (b. 1844); Mayer Albert de Rothschild (b. 1846); Arthur de Rothschild (b. 1851)
- Parent(s): James Mayer Rothschild and Betty von Rothschild

Baroness Charlotte de Rothschild (6 May 1825 – 20 July 1899) was a French socialite, painter, and a member of the prominent Rothschild banking family of France.

== Early years ==
She was born in Paris, the daughter of Betty von Rothschild and James Mayer de Rothschild. Charlotte de Rothschild was raised by very wealthy parents who were at the center of Parisian culture. They patronized a number of major figures in the arts community including Franz Liszt, Gioacchino Rossini, Frédéric Chopin, Honoré de Balzac, Eugène Delacroix, and Heinrich Heine. Chopin had become Charlotte's piano teacher in 1841, and as a tacit acknowledgment of the many years of support extended by Baron James and his wife Betty, dedicated to her an autograph of his Farewell-Waltz in A♭ major, Op. 69 No.1, (almost certainly as an 1843 wedding present) his celebrated Ballade No. 4 in F minor, Op. 52, and four years later another work, his Waltz in C♯ minor, Op. 64, No. 2.

== Married life ==
In 1842, Charlotte married her English-born cousin Nathaniel de Rothschild (1812–1870) and in 1850 they moved to Paris, where he went to work at her father's bank, de Rothschild Frères. They were the parents of:

- Nathalie de Rothschild (1843–1843)
- Nathan James Edouard de Rothschild (1844–1881)
- Mayer Albert de Rothschild (1846–1850)
- Arthur de Rothschild (1851–1903)

While Charlotte de Rothschild and her husband would always live in Paris, in 1853 they purchased the Château Brane-Mouton vineyard that they renamed Château Mouton Rothschild. In 1878, Charlotte bought the Abbaye des Vaux de Cernay in Cernay-la-Ville in the Vallée de Chevreuse, at the time only a ruins of a Cistercian abbey built in 1118. She undertook extensive restoration work and new construction to make the lakeside property into a country home. The property remained in family hands until 1945 when it was by sold by her grandson Henri James de Rothschild to aircraft manufacturer Félix Amiot.

== Artist ==
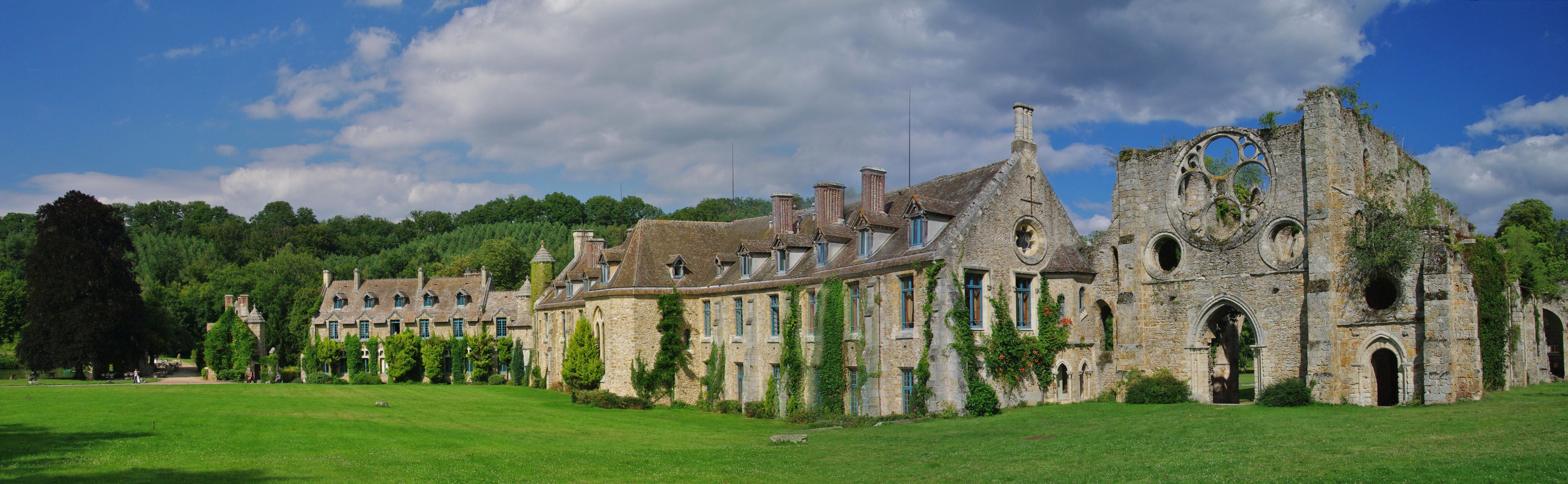
Abbaye des Vaux de Cernay in Cernay-la-Ville in the Vallée de Chevreuse bought by Baroness Charlotte de Rothschild

Like her father, Charlotte de Rothschild was a collector of art and grew up around her artistic friends. As an adult, Charlotte would count amongst her friends the likes of Jean-Baptiste-Camille Corot, Henri Rousseau, and Édouard Manet. Her art purchases included works by Henri Fantin-Latour, Louis-Léopold Boilly, Anthony van Dyck plus a number by Rococo painters Jean-Baptiste-Siméon Chardin, Giovanni Battista Tiepolo and François Boucher. However, Charlotte de Rothschild's interest in art went beyond collecting. Talented in her own right, she studied with Nélie Jacquemart (1841–1912) and would earn respect for her landscape paintings, watercolors and engravings, enough so that she is recognized in the Benezit Dictionary of Artists. She exhibited in 1872 at the Paris Salon as well as at an 1879 exhibition in London, and from 1879 showed work at the annual salon of the Société des aquarellistes français. Although a minor artist, her work has been on display at the Musée du Luxembourg in Paris and other museums around France. Her illuminated Haggadah of Pesach is in the Braginsky Collection.

Charlotte de Rothschild's interest extended to music, entertaining musician friends such as Georges Bizet and Camille Saint-Saëns. Charlotte de Rothschild's lifetime of involvement in art and music would greatly influence her offspring, producing writers, actors and playwrights.

== Later years ==
Tragedy struck her family in 1881 when she lost her eldest surviving child, thirty-seven-year-old James-Edouard. An attorney in the Rothschild bank in Paris, James-Edouard de Rothschild had served in the Garde Mobile during the Franco-Prussian War and suffered from a number of illnesses, including depression that led to his suicide.
