= Betty von Rothschild =

Parisian salonniere and art patron

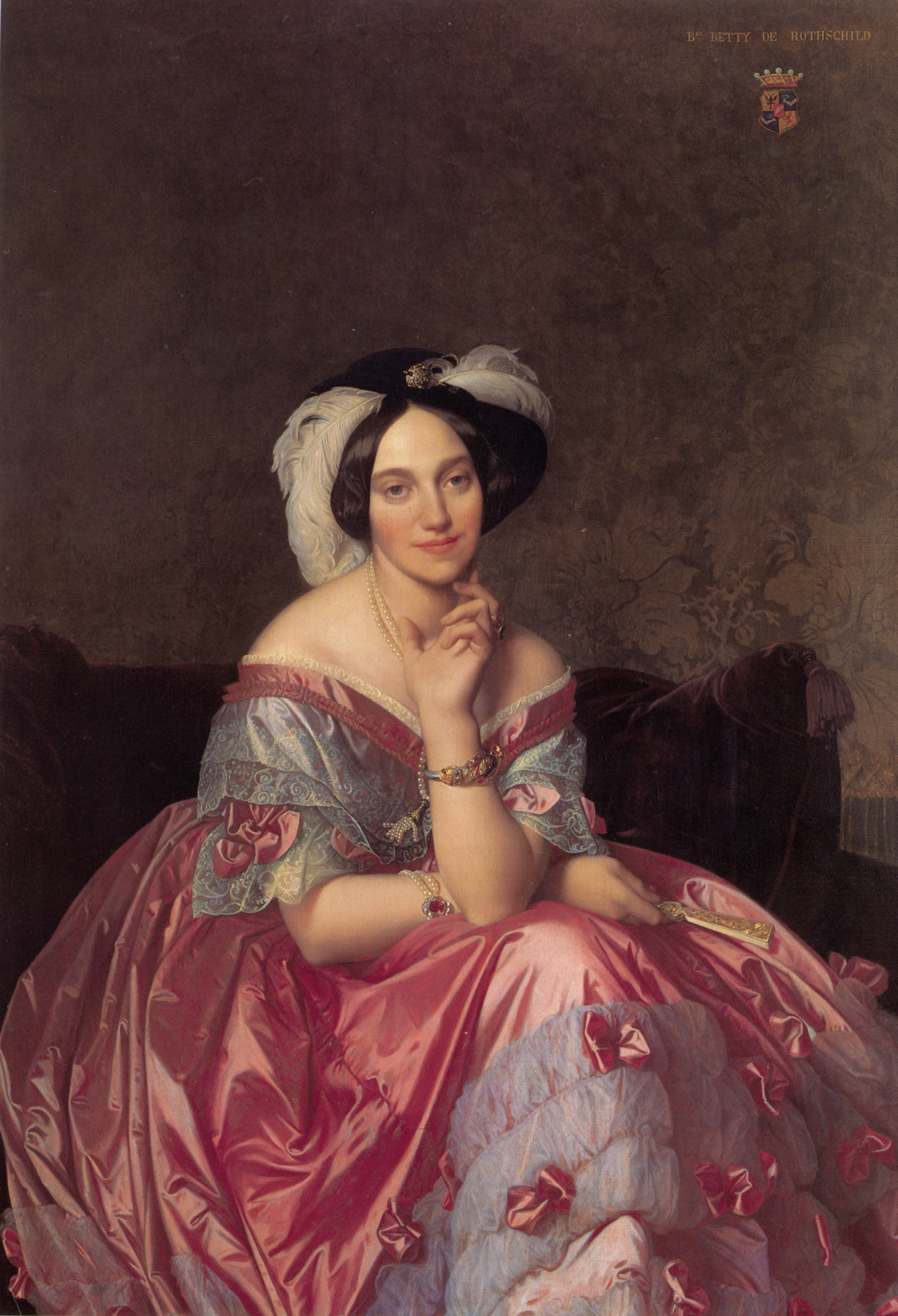
Portrait of Baronne de Rothschild by Ingres, 1848

Betty von Rothschild, Baronne de Rothschild (15 June 1805 – 1 September 1886) was a salonnière, patron of the arts and philanthropist.

== Life ==
Betty von Rothschild was born in Frankfurt to the Jewish Austrian banker Salomon Mayer von Rothschild and Caroline Stern. Her only sibling was her brother Anselm Salomon von Rothschild. In 1824 at the age of 19 Betty married her uncle, the Paris-based banker James Mayer de Rothschild (1792-1868). Both Salomon and James were sons of Mayer Amschel Rothschild, the founder of the Rothschild dynasty.

In Paris she was noted for her salon and for her patronage of the arts. She secured the services of Frédéric Chopin as piano teacher to her family soon after his arrival in Paris, and she commissioned a portrait from Jean-Auguste-Dominique Ingres in 1841, although it was not completed until 1848. In 1842 the artist wrote to a friend: "Tuesday, I have a definite sitting with Mme. de Rothschild, which came at the price of a dozen puerile and sincere letters. Long live portraits! may God damn them…!" She also became a friend of Marie-Amélie, the wife of King Louis-Philippe. Others who frequented her salon in Rue Laffitte in the 9th arrondissement of Paris included Heinrich Heine, Honoré de Balzac, Gioachino Rossini and the Goncourt brothers. From the 1850s she and James spent time at the Château de Ferrières outside Paris, which James commissioned from Joseph Paxton, where spectacular entertainments, including the choir of the Paris Opéra conducted by Rossini, were frequently arranged.

Unlike her husband, she maintained Jewish traditions in the household: James is reported as saying "Pour le judaïsme, voyez ma femme." ("When it comes to Judaism, refer to my wife.") They had five children:

- Charlotte de Rothschild (1825–1899), who married Nathaniel de Rothschild (1812–1870)
- Mayer Alphonse de Rothschild (1827–1905), who married Leonora de Rothschild (1837–1911), the daughter of Lionel de Rothschild of the English branch of the family.
- Gustave Samuel de Rothschild (1829–1911), who married Cécile Anspach
- Salomon James de Rothschild (1835–1864), who married Adèle von Rothschild (1843–1922), daughter of his cousin Mayer Carl von Rothschild
- Edmond James de Rothschild (1845–1934), who married Adelheid von Rothschild (1853–1935), daughter of Wilhelm Carl von Rothschild and Mathilde Hannah von Rothschild of the Naples branch of the Rothschild family

After the death of James de Rothschild in 1868, she spent several months each year in Cannes. in 1881 she purchased and rebuilt the Villa Marie-Thèrese in Cannes. She died in the Château de Boulogne in 1886, and is buried in Père-Lachaise cemetery.

Her son Edmond, who was an ardent Zionist, founded in 1889 the settlement in Ottoman Palestine (now Israel) of Bat Shlomo (Hebrew: בָּת שְׁלֹמֹה, lit. Solomon's Daughter), named in her memory.

== Philanthropy ==
Betty de Rothschild worked with her husband to found the Rothschild Hospital, Paris, opened in 1852, originally to serve the Jewish community. Other activities included the provision of social housing, orphanages, assistance to those suffering from tuberculosis, and the development of the Assistance Publique. She also supported similar initiatives in Cannes.
