= Yanette Delétang-Tardif =

French poet and translator

- Born: Anne Marie Paule Delétang; 18 June 1902; Roubaix, France
- Died: 4 November 1976 (aged 74); Paris, France
- Occupations: Poet, translator, painter, illustrator
- Partner: Raymond Tardif
- Writing career
- Years active: 1929–1963
- Notable awards: Mallarmé prize (1942); Renée Vivien prize (1950); Chevalier de l'Ordre des Arts et des Lettres (1957)
- Movement: Rochefort school

Yanette Delétang-Tardif (18 June 1902 – 4 November 1976) was a French poet, translator into French of Spanish and German works, painter and illustrator. She was a very productive and reputed author of poetry, however she appeared sometimes as a restricted poet.

== Biography ==
Yanette Delétang-Tardif was born Anne Marie Paule Delétang on 18 June 1902 in Roubaix. She was the daughter of Marie Troupeau and Maurice Delétang, an industrialist. In 1927 she married Raymond Tardif, (Note: Alfred Marie Raymond Tardif, called Raymond Tardif, was born the 29th of july 1902 in Tours. He married Anne Marie Paule Delétang on the 5th of February 1927 and died on the 7th of July in 1963. Among other jobs, he worked as Minister's chief of staff for Pierre-Étienne Flandin.) with whom she lived until his death in 1963 and by whom she had one son named Jean-Loup in 1928.

After her marriage, she took her pen name: Yanette Delétang-Tardif. Then she had been succeeding to establish herself as a fully-fledged writer with the publishing of her first collections of poems: Éclats in 1929, Générer, a poetic work about her motherhood experience, in 1930 and Vol d'oiseaux in 1931. Those early works testify to the sway of Paul Valéry's rhythmic pattern. In her book Confidences des îles written in 1934, she adopted a style revealing the adding influence of Guy Lavaud. (Note: Guy Lavaud (1883 - 1958) was a French symbolist poet whose style was characterized by conciseness and clarity.) Meantime, she published in several periodicals, ranked as a recognized poet. In 1935, the monthly L'Année poétique brought out a special issue devoted entirely to her, in which she had her portrait drawn by Jean de Bosschère. Inquisitive about surrealism as a cultural movement, she was little inclined to its ideological side.

As a poet, she had joined the École de Rochefort, (Note: The École de Rochefort (Note: Rochefort school) is a poetic movement that rose up against the national framework of the French literature advocated by the Vichy Government, during the World War II German occupation of France, in order to defend humanism and freedom of expression.) inside which she was the only woman, since the poet Jean Bouhier created this poetic movement in 1941. Even though she had so become a founding member of that talented group of poets, she remained free and defended personal conceptions of poetry, such as the benevolent welcome of Stéphane Mallarmé's poems, very dissimilar from the Rochefort group's poetic ideal. In 1942 she won the Mallarmé prize to honour her work and bring out her book Tenter de vivre. At that time she also met Jean Cocteau with whom she became well acquainted. At her particular request then, Jean Cocteau drew her portrait, once reproduced in his war journal and made a second time in 1943. Like the accomplished artist she admired, she formed a passion for circus about which she wrote articles.

Some surrealists distributed a leaflet at the end of 1942–1943 wintertime in which they mocked her poetical works through her interest for circus arts and aimed to condemn who they considered as collaborationist artists. (Note: The distributed leaflet was entitled VOS GUEULES ! (Note: SHUT UP!) and the poet's name was included in the following list of authors: Yves Bonnat, Paul Claudel, Jean Cocteau, Luc Estang, Patrice de La Tour du Pin, Henri de Lescoët, Lanza del Vasto, Philippe Dumaine, Robert Ganzo, Roger Lannes, Jean Lescure, Jean Paulhan and Jean Rousselot.) Thus, among several authors, they put a stress on the single contribution to La Nouvelle Revue Française made by Yanette Delétang-Tardif (Note: The only contribution which dealt with Delétang-Tardif's collaboration on the involved magazine was the text Scène de l'ange.) regarding the period when the quarterly magazine was caught up in the collaboration movement. Despite the vigorous libel actions of those surrealists, she was not banned as an undesirable writer by the Comité National des Ecrivains (Note: The Comité National des Ecrivains (Note: National Committee of Writers) is a literary organization of the French Resistance created in 1941 which gathered around fifty writers to define collaboration, after World War II.) after the Liberation and, therefore, never prosecuted for collaborationism.

She kept up a correspondence with Max Jacob, who was a well-known figure among the most representative fellows of the Rochefort poetic movement. Then, following his death in 1944, she was the first one to transcribe the most extensive story from witness statements of the martyrdom of the Jewish poet, and proved to be an investigative writer.

At that time, Gérard de Nerval's sonnets The Chimeras and German poets of the romantic era belonged to her beloved literatures, which had played a part in the development of her works. She was especially interested in Johann Wolfgang von Goethe, of whom she gave a renowned French translation of the poems — together with Maurice Betz — in 1946. In 1949 she collaborated with Paul Arnold on the French translation of Friedrich Nietzsche's complete poetical works. Although never published in her lifetime, she also created a really fine translation of Nachtwachen von Bonaventura, (Note: Nightwatches of Bonaventura) reflecting her interest in romanticism through a masterpiece of German literature.

Delétang-Tardif's writing was not confined to poetry nor translated works and, following her taste, she wrote novels and completed critical works. She was the faithful friend of the French novelist and critic Edmond Jaloux, of whom she published a biography in 1947. She was elected as a member of the jury for the Guillaume Apollinaire prize in the same year.

She became a member of the Société des gens de lettres in 1948. The year 1950 marked her author career when she was awarded the recipient of the Renée Vivien prize for her poetry collection Sept chants royaux.

From the outset of her career, her nom de plume referred to her husband's family name, which she attached to her father's name. When he died she was plunged into despair. In the aftermath of her husband's death, she cut off from the literary world of Paris and left her position as a member of the jury for the Guillaume Apollinaire prize.

She died in relative obscurity in 1976 in Paris.

== Works ==
- Éclats (Aristide Quillet, 1929)
- Générer (Aristide Quillet, 1930)
- Vol d'oiseaux (Aristide Quillet, 1931)
- Confidences des îles (Corréa, 1934)
- Briser n'est rien (Sagesse, 1934)
- La colline (Debresse, 1935)
- Morte en songe (Sagesse, 1938)
- Pressentiment de la rose (Cahiers de Rochefort, 1941)
- Poèmes du vitrier (Poètes, 1941)
- Tenter de vivre (Denoël, 1943)
- Edellina, ou Les Pouvoirs de la musique (Amis de Rochefort, 1943)
- Sept chants royaux (Éditions du Rond-Point, 1945)
- Les séquestrés (La Table Ronde, 1945)
- Edmond Jaloux (La Table Ronde, 1947)
- La nuit des temps (P. Seghers, 1951)
- Chants royaux (P. Seghers, 1956)
- Les emblèmes (Subervie, 1957)
- Almanach (C.E.L.F. Malines, 1958)
- Les éléments perdus (Subervie, 1963)
