= Lucie Delarue-Mardrus =

French writer and sculptor

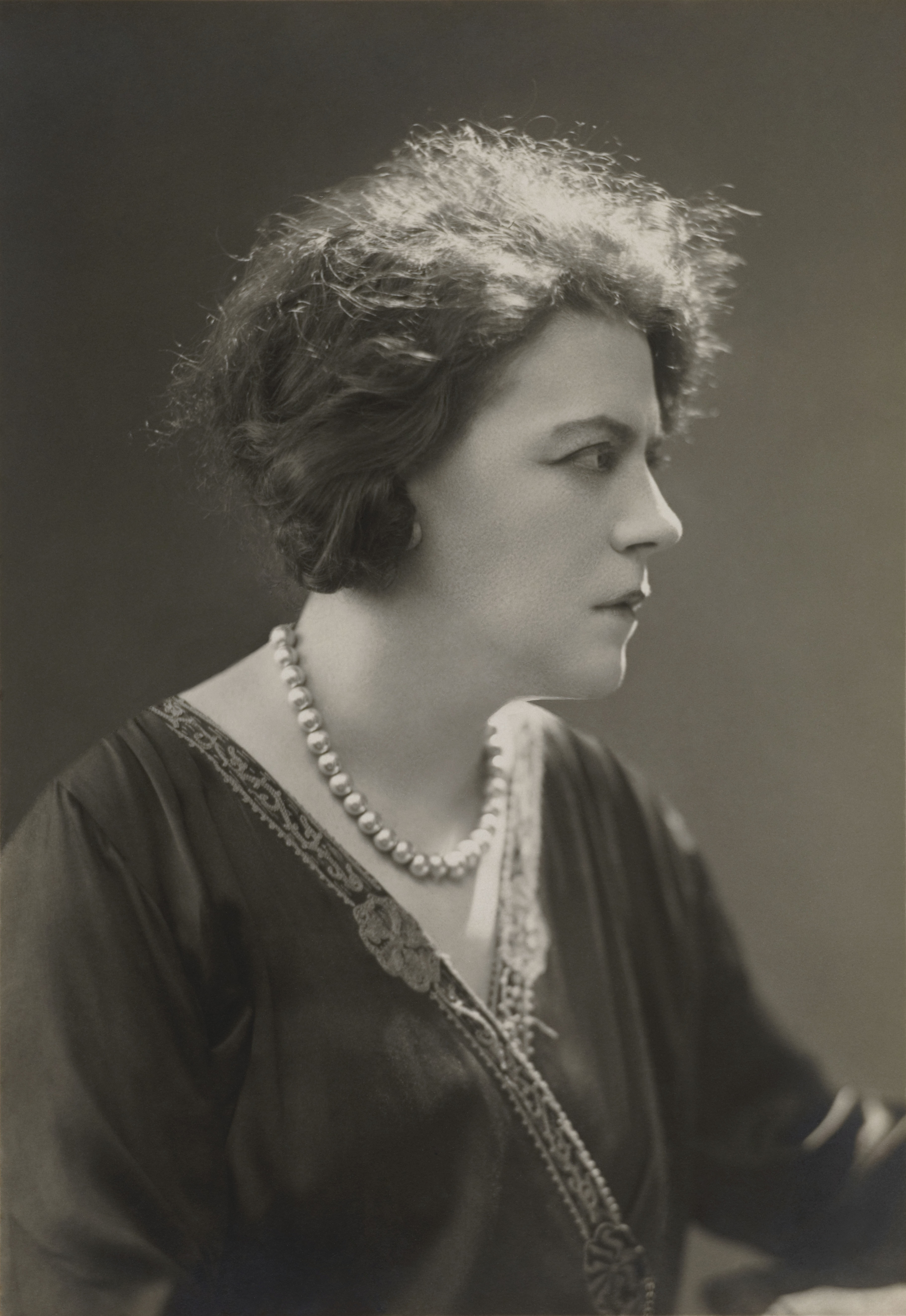
Lucie Delarue-Mardrus (1928)

Lucie Delarue-Mardrus (3 November 1874, Honfleur – 26 April 1945, Château-Gontier) was a French journalist, poet, novelist, sculptor, historian and designer. She was a prolific writer, who produced more than 70 books in her lifetime.

== Biography ==
In France, she is best known for her poem beginning with the line "L'odeur de mon pays était dans une pomme" ("In an apple I held the smell of my native land.") Her writings express her love of travel and her love for her native Normandy. L'Ex-voto (1932), for example, describes the life and milieu of the fishermen of Honfleur on the eve of the twentieth century.

Prior to her recognition as a writer, she won the praise of Sully Prudhomme at a private poetry reading, which she attended accompanied by her mother. She was married to the translator J. C. Mardrus from 1900 to 1915, but her primary sexual orientation was toward women. She was involved with several women throughout her lifetime, and she wrote extensively of lesbian love.

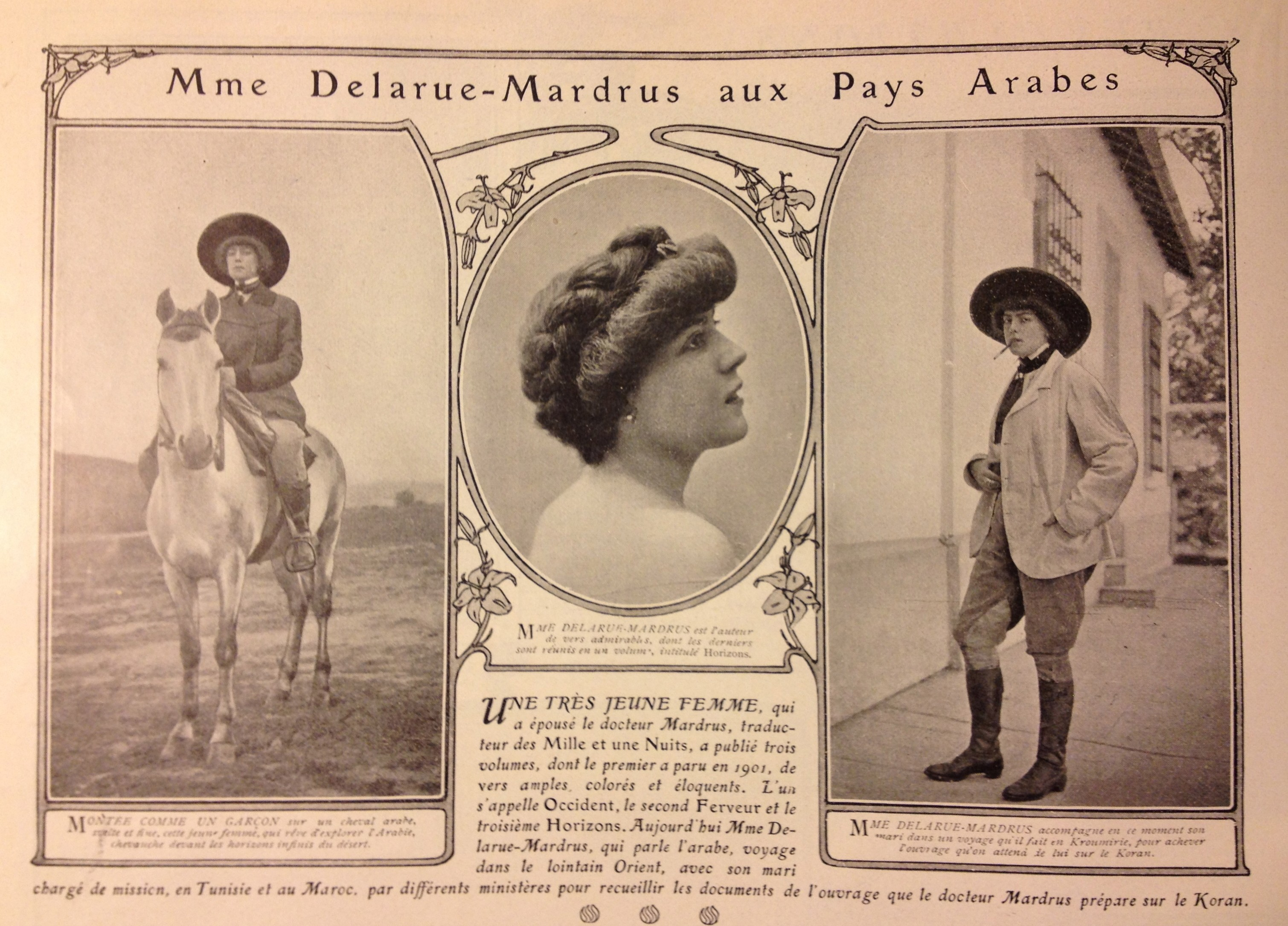
September 1905 issue of La Vie Heureuse

In 1902-03, she wrote a series of love poems to the American writer and salon hostess Natalie Clifford Barney, published posthumously in 1957 as Nos secrètes amours (Our Secret Loves). She also depicted Barney in her 1930 novel, L'Ange et les Pervers (The Angel and the Perverts), in which she said she "analyzed and described Natalie at length as well as the life into which she initiated me". The protagonist of the novel is a hermaphrodite named Marion who lives a double life, frequenting literary salons in female dress, then changing from skirt to trousers to attend gay soirées. Barney appears as "Laurette Wells", a salon hostess who spends much of the novel trying to win back an ex-lover, loosely based on Barney's real-life attempts at regaining her relationship with her former lover, Renée Vivien.

The famed courtesan Liane de Pougy wrote in admiration of Delarue-Mardrus, stating in part:

"She is adorable. She sculpts, mounts to horse, loves a woman, then another, and yet another. She was able to free herself from her husband and has never embarked on a second marriage or the conquest of another man."

French composer Angèle Ravizé used Delarue-Mardrus’ text in her song “Les Importuns.”

== Awards ==
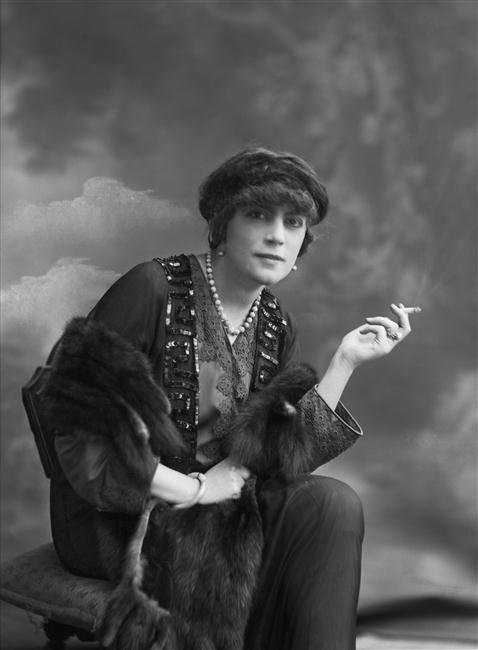
Portrait by Paul Nadar

She was awarded the first Renée Vivien prize for women poets in 1936.

== Sources ==
- Livia, Anna(1995). "Introduction: Lucie Delarue-Mardrus and the Phrenetic Harlequinade." Delarue-Mardrus, Lucie; trans. Anna Livia (1995). The Angel and the Perverts. New York: New York University Press. pp. 1–60. ISBN 0-8147-5098-2.
- Souhami, Diana (2005). Wild Girls: Paris, Sappho, and Art: The Lives and Loves of Natalie Barney and Romaine Brooks. New York: St. Martin's Press. ISBN 0-312-34324-8.
- Lucie Delarue-Mardus, via bouquinerie-com
