= Natalie Clifford Barney =

American playwright, poet and novelist (1876–1972)

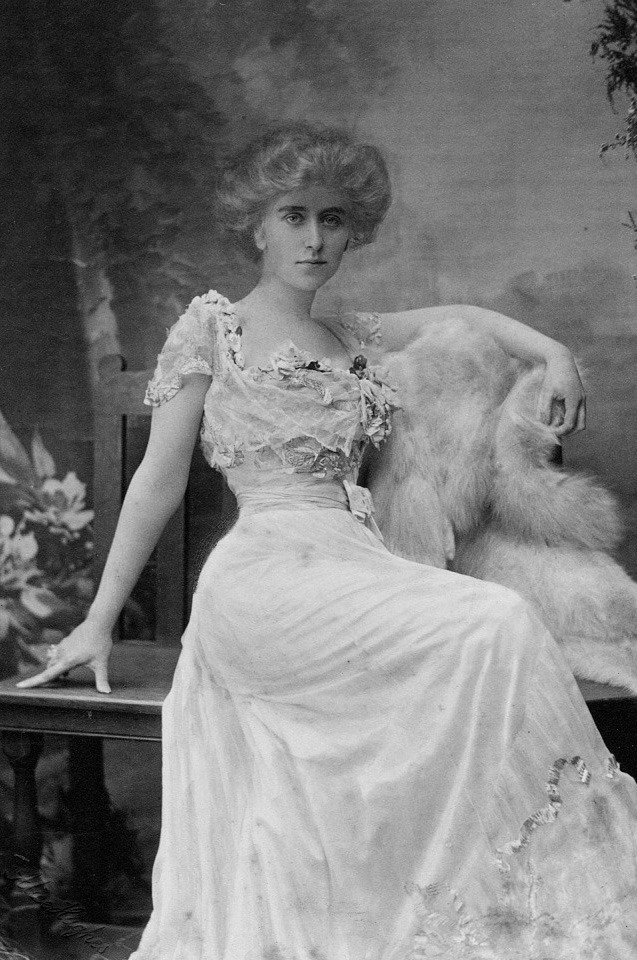
- Barney in 1898
- Born: October 31, 1876; Dayton, Ohio, US
- Died: February 2, 1972 (aged 95); Paris, France
- Burial place: Passy Cemetery
- Known for: Hosting a literary salon; wrote drama, literature, poetry

Natalie Clifford Barney (October 31, 1876 – February 2, 1972) was an American writer who hosted a literary salon at her home in Paris that brought together French and international writers. She influenced other authors through her salon and also with her poetry, plays, and epigrams, often thematically tied to her lesbianism and feminism.

Barney was born into a wealthy family. She was partly educated in France, and expressed a desire from a young age to live openly as a lesbian. She moved to France with her first romantic partner, Eva Palmer. Inspired by the work of Sappho, Barney began publishing love poems to women under her own name as early as 1900. Writing in both French and English, she supported feminism and pacifism. She opposed monogamy and had many overlapping long and short-term relationships, including on-and-off romances with poet Renée Vivien and courtesan Liane de Pougy and longer relationships with writer Élisabeth de Gramont and painter Romaine Brooks.

Barney hosted a salon at her home at 20-22 rue Jacob in the 6th arrondissement of Paris for more than 60 years, bringing together writers and artists from around the world, including many leading figures in French, American, and British literature. Attendees of various sexualities mingled comfortably at the weekly gatherings. She worked to promote writing by women and hosted a "Women's Academy" (L'Académie des Femmes) in her salon as a response to the all-male French Academy. The salon closed for the duration of World War II while Barney lived in Italy with Brooks. She initially espoused some pro-fascist views, but supported the Allies by the end of the war. After the war, she returned to Paris, resumed the salon, and continued influencing or inspiring writers such as Truman Capote.

Barney had a wide literary influence. Remy de Gourmont addressed public letters to her using the nickname l'Amazone (the Amazon), (Note: The dictionary definition of amazone at Wiktionary) and Barney's association with both de Gourmont and the nickname lasted until her death. Her life and love affairs served as inspiration for many novels written by others, ranging from de Pougy's erotic French bestseller Idylle Saphique to Radclyffe Hall's The Well of Loneliness, the most famous lesbian novel of the twentieth century.

== Early life ==
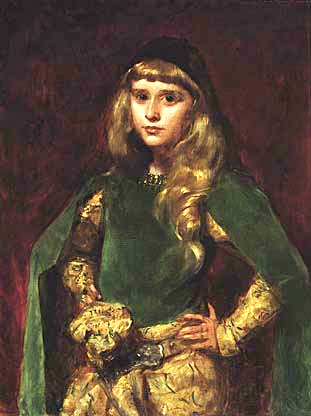
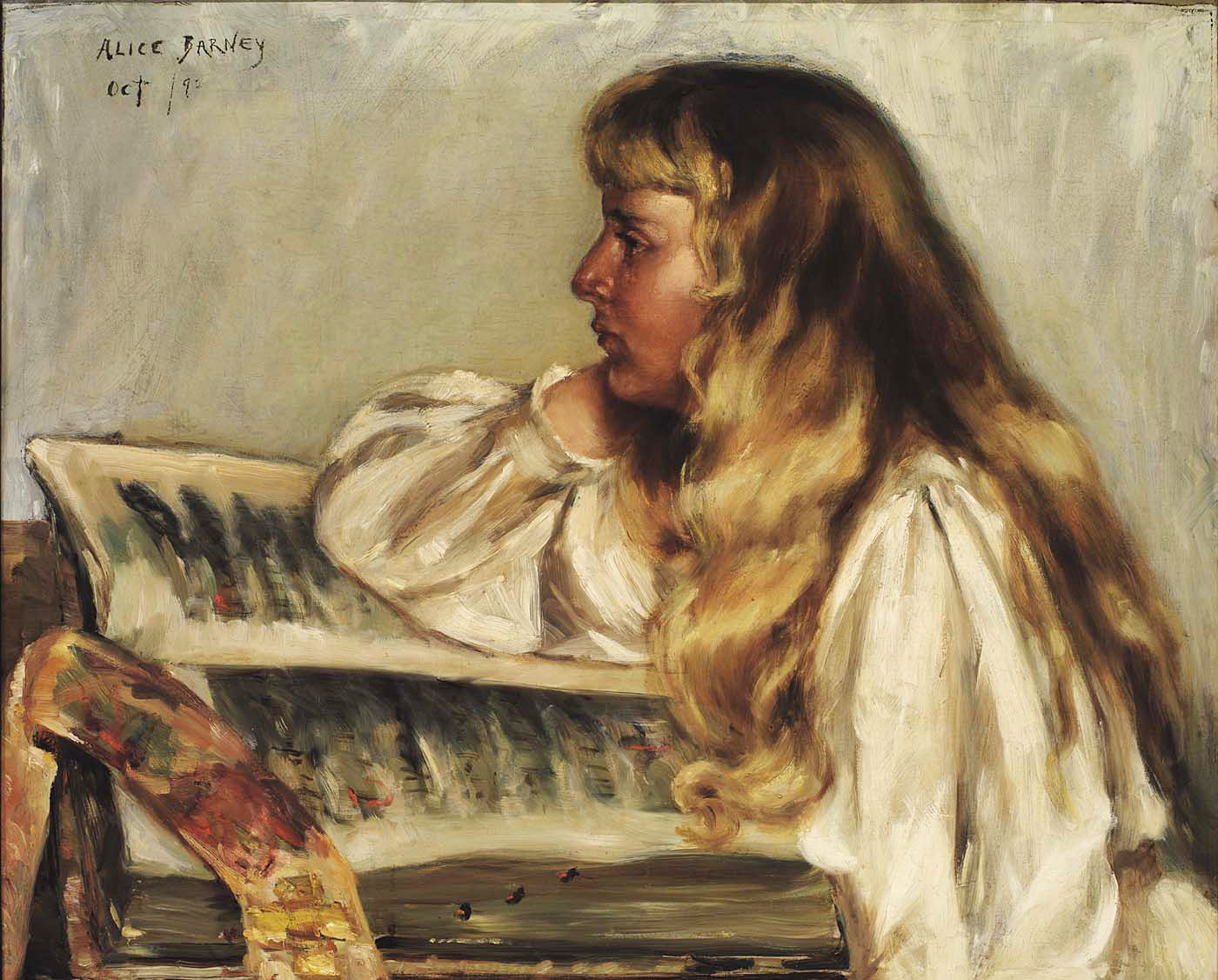
First: Painting by Carolus-Duran of Barney at age ten that hung on the wall of her salon at 20, Rue Jacob. Second: Barney at about age 13, painted by Alice Pike Barney.

Barney was born in 1876 in Dayton, Ohio, to Albert Clifford Barney and Alice Pike Barney. When Barney was a year old, she and her family moved to Cincinnati, staying in a suite of rooms in the Burnet House, a grand hotel. The Barneys were living here when Natalie's sister, Laura, was born in November 1879. They stayed at the Burnet House until eventually moving to a house in the elite Mount Auburn neighborhood in 1881.

When Barney was five years old, she encountered Oscar Wilde at a New York hotel. Wilde scooped her up as she ran past him fleeing a group of small boys and held her out of their reach. Then he sat her down on his knee and told her a story. The next day he joined Barney and her mother on the beach, and Wilde inspired Alice to pursue art seriously, which she did despite her husband's disapproval.

Like many girls of her time, Barney had a haphazard education. Her interest in the French language began with a governess who read Jules Verne stories aloud to her, so she would have to learn quickly to understand them. She and her younger sister, Laura, attended Les Ruches, a French boarding school in Fontainebleau, France, founded by feminist Marie Souvestre. As an adult, she spoke and wrote French fluently.

When she was ten, her family moved from Ohio to the Sheridan Circle area of Washington D.C., spending summers at their large cottage in Bar Harbor, Maine. As the rebellious and unconventional daughter of one of the wealthiest families in town, she was often mentioned in Washington newspapers. In her early twenties she made headlines by galloping through Bar Harbor while driving a second horse on a lead ahead of her, riding astride instead of sidesaddle.

Barney later said she knew she was a lesbian by age twelve, and she was determined to "live openly, without hiding anything".

== Early relationships ==
=== Eva Palmer ===
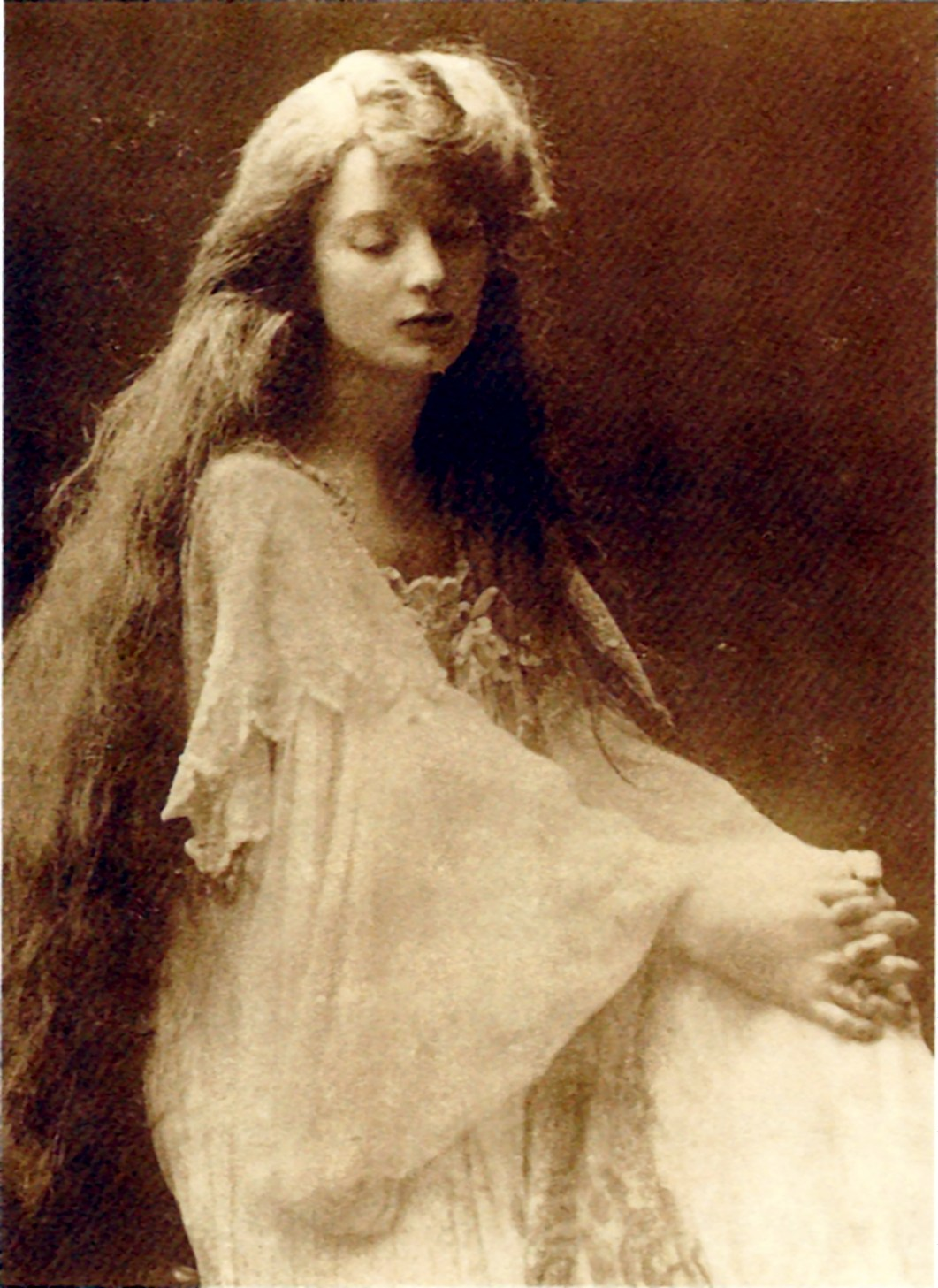
Eva Palmer

Barney's earliest intimate relationship was with Eva Palmer. They became acquainted during summer vacations in Bar Harbor, Maine, and began a sexual relationship during one such trip in 1893. Barney likened Palmer's appearance to that of a medieval virgin. The two remained close for several years. As young adults in Paris they shared an apartment at 4 rue Chalgrin and eventually took their own residences in Neuilly. Barney frequently solicited Palmer's help in her romantic pursuits of other women, including Renée Vivien. Palmer ultimately left Barney's side for Greece and eventually married Angelos Sikelianos. Their relationship did not survive this turn of events: Barney took a dim view of Angelos and heated letters were exchanged. Later in their lives the friendship was repaired through correspondence and reunions in New York.

=== Liane de Pougy ===
In 1899, after seeing the courtesan Liane de Pougy at a dance hall in Paris, Barney presented herself at de Pougy's residence in a page costume and announced she was a "page of love" sent by Sappho. Although de Pougy was one of the most famous women in France, constantly sought after by wealthy and titled men, Barney's audacity charmed her.

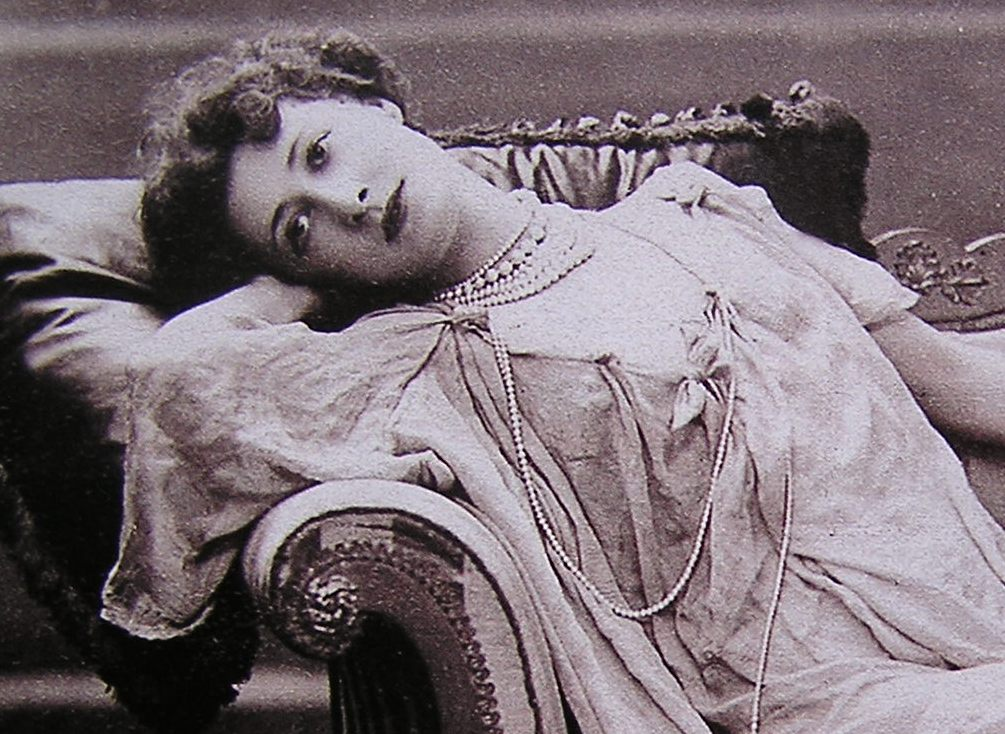
Liane de Pougy in 1900

Barney stood to inherit some family wealth held in trust if she either married or waited for her father's death. While courting de Pougy, Barney was engaged to Robert Cassat, a member of another wealthy railroad family. Barney was open with Cassat about her love of women and relationship with de Pougy. In the hopes of securing the Barney trust money, the three briefly considered a rushed wedding between Barney and Cassat and an adoption of de Pougy. When Cassat ended the engagement, Barney attempted unsuccessfully to persuade her father to give her the money anyway.

By the end of 1899, the two had broken up after quarreling repeatedly over Barney's desire to "rescue" de Pougy from her life as a courtesan. Despite the breakup, the two continued having liaisons for decades.

Their on-and-off affair became the subject of de Pougy's tell-all roman à clef, Idylle Saphique (Sapphic Idyll). Published in 1901, the book and its sexually suggestive scenes became the talk of Paris, reprinted more than 70 times in its first year. Barney was soon well known as the model for one of the characters.

Barney herself contributed a chapter to Idylle Saphique in which she described reclining at de Pougy's feet in a screened box at the theater, watching Sarah Bernhardt's play Hamlet. During intermission, Barney (as "Flossie") compares Hamlet's plight with that of women: "What is there for women who feel the passion for action when pitiless Destiny holds them in chains? Destiny made us women at a time when the law of men is the only law that is recognized." She also wrote Lettres à une Connue (Letters to a Woman I Have Known), her own epistolary novel about the affair. Although Barney failed to find a publisher for the book (published in 2024) and later called it naïve and clumsy, it is notable for its discussion of homosexuality, which Barney regarded as natural and compared to albinism. "My queerness," she said, "is not a vice, is not deliberate, and harms no one."

=== Renée Vivien ===
In November 1899, Barney met the poet Pauline Tarn, better known by her pen name Renée Vivien. For Vivien it was love at first sight, while Barney became fascinated with Vivien after hearing her recite one of her poems, which Barney described as "haunted by the desire for death". Their romantic relationship was also a creative exchange that inspired both of them to write. Barney provided a feminist theoretical framework which Vivien explored in her poetry. They adapted the imagery of the Symbolist poets along with the conventions of courtly love to describe love between women, also finding examples of heroic women in history and myth. Sappho was an especially important influence and they studied Greek so as to read the surviving fragments of her poetry in the original. Both wrote plays about her life.

Renée Vivien (standing) and Barney; posing for a portrait in Directoire-era costume

Vivien saw Barney as a muse and as Barney put it, "she had found new inspiration through me, almost without knowing me". Barney felt Vivien had cast her as a femme fatale and that she wanted "to lose herself ... entirely in suffering" for the sake of her art. Vivien also believed in monogamy, which Barney was unwilling to agree to. While Barney was visiting her family in Washington, D.C. in 1901, Vivien stopped answering her letters. Barney tried to get her back for years, at one point persuading a friend, operatic mezzo-soprano Emma Calvé, to sing under Vivien's window so she could throw a poem (wrapped around a bouquet of flowers) up to Vivien on her balcony. Both flowers and poem were intercepted and returned by a governess.

In 1904 she wrote Je Me Souviens (I Remember), an intensely personal prose poem about their relationship which was presented as a single handwritten copy to Vivien in an attempt to win her back. They reconciled and traveled together to Lesbos, where they lived happily together for a short time and discussed starting a school of poetry for women like the one which Sappho, according to tradition, had founded on Lesbos some 2,500 years before. However, Vivien soon got a letter from her lover Baroness Hélène van Zuylen and went to Constantinople thinking she would break up with her in person. Vivien planned to meet Barney in Paris afterward, but instead stayed with the Baroness. This time, the breakup was permanent.

Vivien's health declined rapidly after this. The author Colette, who herself had an affair with Barney in 1906, was Vivien's friend and neighbor. According to Colette, Vivien ate almost nothing and drank heavily, even rinsing her mouth with perfumed water to hide the smell. Colette's account has led some to call Vivien an anorexic, but this diagnosis did not yet exist at the time. Vivien was also addicted to the sedative chloral hydrate. In 1908 she attempted suicide by overdosing on laudanum and died the following year. In a memoir written fifty years later, Barney said, "She could not be saved. Her life was a long suicide. Everything turned to dust and ashes in her hands."

In 1949, two years after the death of Hélène van Zuylen, Barney restored the Renée Vivien Prize with a financial grant under the authority of the Société des gens de lettres and took on the chairmanship of the jury in 1950.

=== Olive Custance ===
Barney purchased and read Opals in 1900, a debut collection of poems by Olive Custance. Responding to the lesbian themes in the poetry, Barney began corresponding with Custance, who was bisexual, and exchanging poems. The two met in 1901 at Barney and Vivien's home in Paris, and they soon began a short romantic relationship. While Barney's infidelity aggravated Vivien, Custance was also pursuing a relationship with Lord Alfred Douglas, who she would later marry.

== Poetry and plays ==
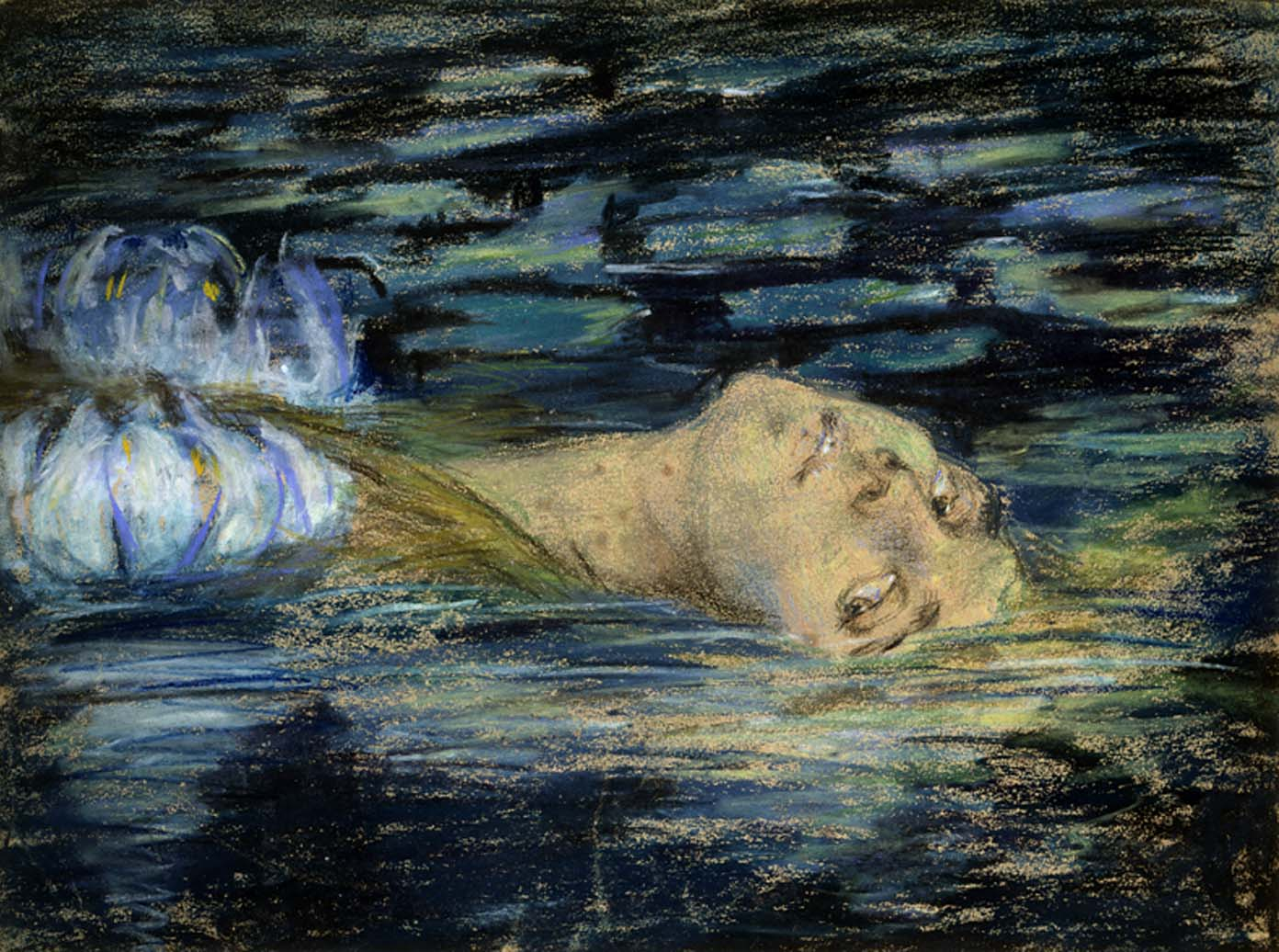
Waterlily, by Barney's mother Alice of her cousin Ellen Goin, an illustration in Quelques Portraits-Sonnets de Femmes

Quelques Portraits-Sonnets de Femmes, 1900 edition cover

In 1900, Barney published her first book, a collection of poems called Quelques Portraits-Sonnets de Femmes (Some Portrait-Sonnets of Women). The poems were written in traditional French verse and a formal, old-fashioned style since Barney did not care for free verse. Quelques Portraits has been described as "apprentice work", a classifier which betrays its historical significance. According to biographer Suzanne Rodriguez, the collection's publication meant that Barney became the first woman poet to openly write about the love of women since Sappho. Her mother contributed pastel illustrations of the poems' subjects, wholly unaware three of the four women who modelled for her were her daughter's lovers.

Reviews were generally positive and glossed over the lesbian theme of the poems, some even misrepresenting it. The Washington Mirror said Barney "writes odes to men's lips and eyes; not like a novice, either". However, a headline in a society gossip paper cried out "Sappho Sings in Washington" and this alerted her father, who bought and destroyed the publisher's remaining stock and printing plates.

To escape her father's sway Barney published her next book, Cinq Petits Dialogues Grecs (Five Short Greek Dialogues, 1901), under the pseudonym Tryphé. The name came from the works of Pierre Louÿs, who helped edit and revise the manuscript. Barney also dedicated the book to him. The first of the dialogues is set in ancient Greece and contains a long description of Sappho, who is "more faithful in her inconstancy than others in their fidelity". Another argues for paganism over Christianity. After the death of Barney's father in 1902, his approximately $9 million fortune ($335 million in 2018) was left in trust with annual income to be split equally between Barney, her mother, and her sister. His death and the money freed her from any need to conceal the authorship of her books; she never used a pseudonym again. She considered scandal "the best way of getting rid of nuisances" (meaning heterosexual attention from young men).

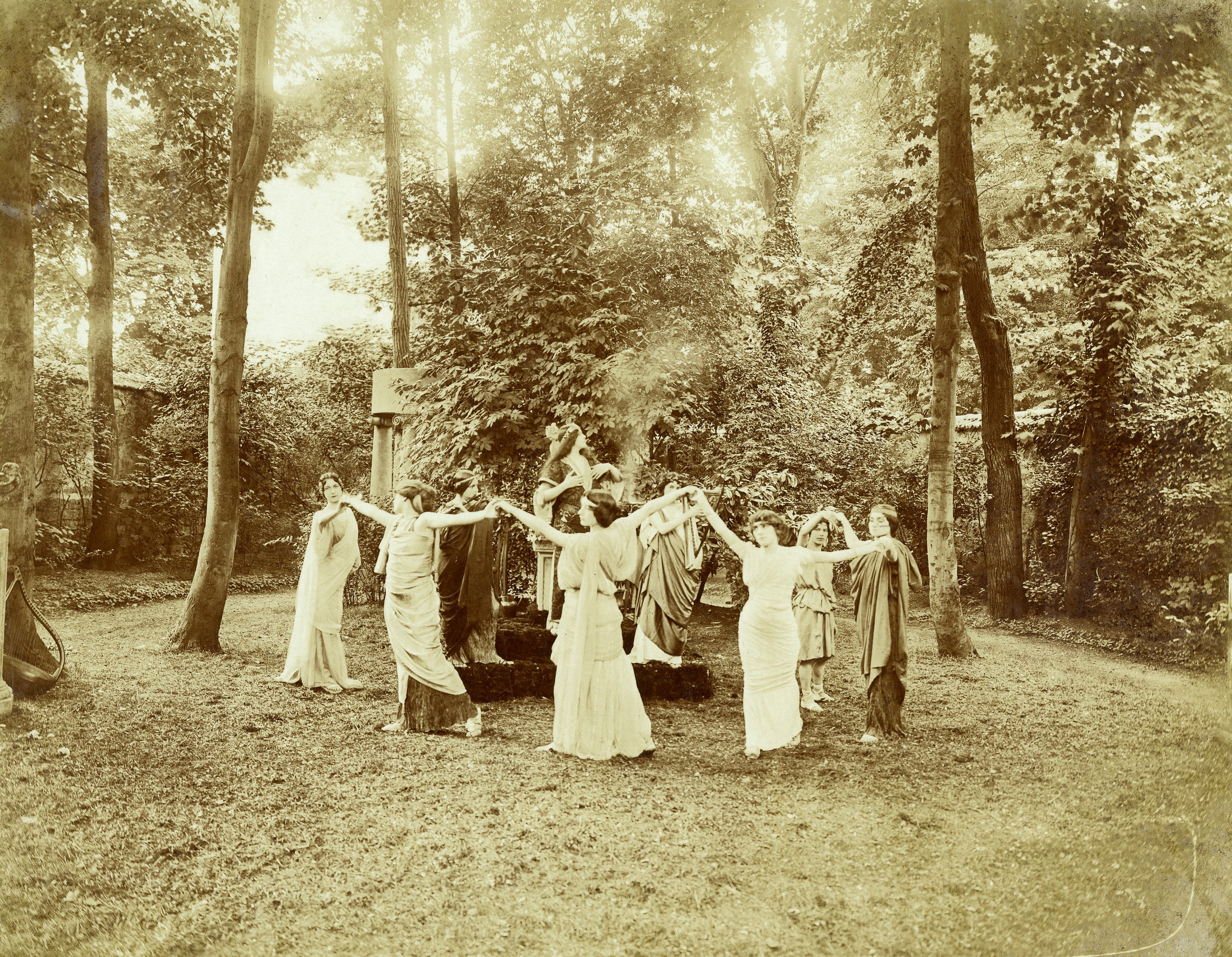
A gathering in Barney's garden, possibly a performance of Équivoque with Barney and Eva Palmer

Je Me Souviens was published in 1910, after Vivien's death. That same year, Barney published Actes et Entr'actes (Acts and Interludes), a collection of short plays and poems. One of the plays was Équivoque (Ambiguity), a revisionist version of the legend of Sappho's death: instead of throwing herself off a cliff for the love of Phaon the sailor, she does so out of grief that Phaon is marrying the woman she loves. The play incorporates quotations from Sappho's fragments, with Barney's own footnotes in Greek, and was performed with ancient Greek-inspired music and dance.

Barney did not take her poetry as seriously as Vivien did, saying "if I had one ambition it was to make my life itself into a poem". Her plays were only performed through amateur productions in her garden. According to Karla Jay, most of them lacked coherent plots and "would probably baffle even the most sympathetic audience". After 1910 she mostly wrote the epigrams and memoirs, for which she is better known. Her last book of poetry was called Poems & Poemes: Autres Alliances and came out in 1920, bringing together romantic poetry in both French and English. Barney asked Ezra Pound to edit the poems, but ignored his detailed recommendations.

== Salon ==
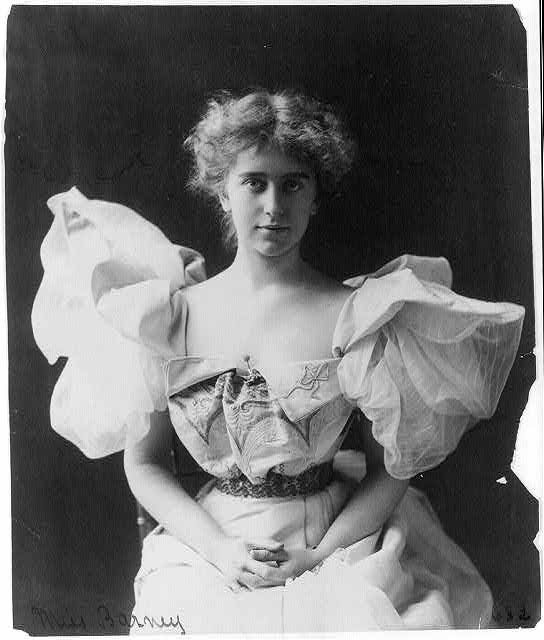
Barney, c. 1890–1910, photographed by Frances Benjamin Johnston

For over 60 years, Barney hosted a literary salon, first in Neuilly but mostly at her home at 20, Rue Jacob, in Paris. Her salon was a weekly, Friday gathering at which people met to socialize and discuss literature, art, music and any other topic of interest. Though she hosted some of the most prominent male writers of her time, Barney strove to shed light on female writers and their work.

In addition to its focus on women, Barney's salon was distinguished by its deliberately international character. She brought together expatriate Modernists with members of the French Academy. The salon Biographer Joan Schenkar described Barney's salon as "a place where lesbian assignations and appointments with academics could coexist in a kind of cheerful, cross-pollinating, cognitive dissonance". The range of sexualities welcomed at the salon was also uncommon in Paris, and Barney's openness with her own sexuality made her salon comfortable to homosexual or bisexual attendees.

In the 1900s Barney held early gatherings of the salon at her house in Neuilly. The entertainment included poetry readings and theatricals (in which Colette sometimes performed). Mata Hari performed a dance once, riding into the garden naked as Lady Godiva on a white horse harnessed with turquoise cloisonné. The play Equivoque may have led Barney to leave Neuilly in 1909. According to a contemporary newspaper article, her landlord objected to her holding an outdoor performance of a play about Sappho, which he felt "followed nature too closely". She canceled her lease and rented the pavilion on Rue Jacob in Paris's Latin Quarter, and her salon was held there until the late 1960s. This was a small two-story house, separated on three sides from the main building on the street. Next to the pavilion was a large, overgrown garden with a Doric "Temple of Friendship" tucked into one corner. In this new location, the salon grew a more prim outward face, with poetry readings and conversation, perhaps because Barney had been told the pavilion's floors would not hold up to large dancing parties. Frequent guests during this period included poets Pierre Louÿs and Paul Claudel, diplomat Philippe Berthelot and translator J. C. Mardrus.

During World War I, the salon became a haven for those opposed to the war. Henri Barbusse gave a reading from his anti-war novel Under Fire and Barney hosted a Women's Congress for Peace. Other visitors to the salon during the war included Oscar Milosz, Auguste Rodin and poet Alan Seeger, who came while on leave from the French Foreign Legion.

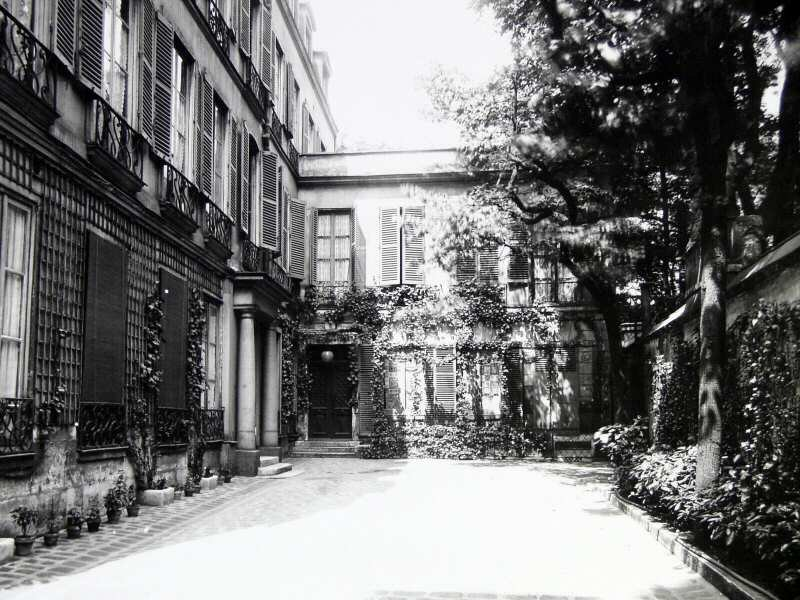
Two-story pavilion at 20, Rue Jacob

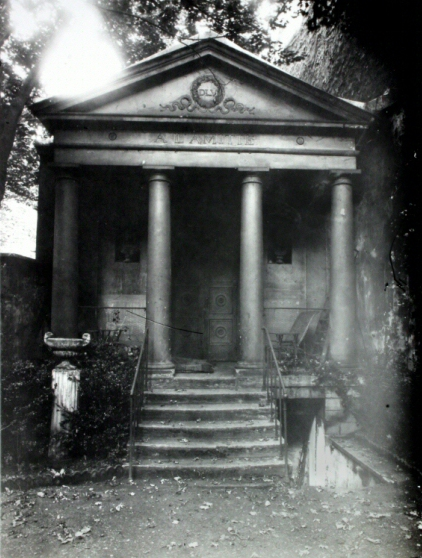
Temple of Friendship

Ezra Pound was a close friend of Barney's and often visited. The two schemed together to subsidize Paul Valéry and T. S. Eliot so they could leave their jobs and focus on writing, but Valéry found other patrons and Eliot refused the grant. Pound introduced Barney to avant-garde composer George Antheil, and, while her own taste in music leaned towards the traditional, she hosted premieres of Antheil's Symphony for Five Instruments and First String Quartet. It was also at Barney's salon that Pound met his longtime mistress, the violinist Olga Rudge.

In 1927 Barney started an Académie des Femmes (Women's Academy) to honor women writers. This was a response to the influential Académie Française (French Academy) which had been founded in the 17th century by Louis XIII and whose 40 members included no women at the time. Unlike the French Academy, Barney's was not a formal organization but rather a series of readings held as part of the regular Friday salons. Honorees included Colette, Gertrude Stein, Anna Wickham, Rachilde, Lucie Delarue-Mardrus, Mina Loy, Djuna Barnes and posthumously, Renée Vivien. The academy's activities wound down after 1927.

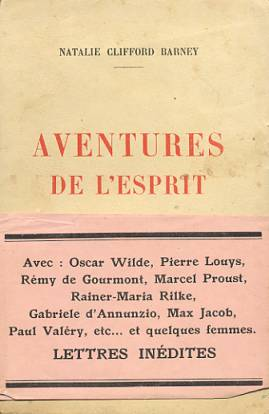
Cover of Aventures de l'Esprit

Other visitors to the salon during the 1920s included French writers Jeanne Galzy, André Gide, Anatole France, Max Jacob, Louis Aragon and Jean Cocteau. English-language writers also visited, including Ford Madox Ford, W. Somerset Maugham, F. Scott Fitzgerald, Sinclair Lewis, Sherwood Anderson, Thornton Wilder, T. S. Eliot and William Carlos Williams. Barney also hosted German poet Rainer Maria Rilke, Bengali poet Rabindranath Tagore (the first Nobel laureate from Asia), Romanian aesthetician and diplomat Matila Ghyka, journalist Janet Flanner (also known as Genêt, who set the New Yorker style), journalist, activist and publisher Nancy Cunard, publishers Caresse and Harry Crosby, publisher Blanche Knopf, art collector and patron Peggy Guggenheim, Sylvia Beach (the bookstore owner who published James Joyce's Ulysses), painters Tamara de Lempicka and Marie Laurencin and dancer Isadora Duncan.

For her 1929 book Aventures de l'Esprit (Adventures of the Mind) Barney drew a social diagram which crowded the names of over a hundred people who had attended the salon into a rough map of the house, garden and Temple of Friendship. The first half of the book had reminiscences of 13 male writers she had known or met over the years and the second half had a chapter for each member of her Académie des Femmes.

In the late 1920s Radclyffe Hall drew a crowd reading her novel The Well of Loneliness, recently banned in the UK. A reading by poet Edna St. Vincent Millay packed the salon in 1932. At another Friday salon in the 1930s Virgil Thomson sang from Four Saints in Three Acts, an opera based on a libretto by Stein.

Of the famous Modernist writers who spent time in Paris, Ernest Hemingway never made an appearance at the salon. James Joyce came once or twice but did not care for it. Marcel Proust never attended a Friday but did come once to talk with Barney about lesbian culture whilst doing research for In Search of Lost Time, though he ended up too nervous to bring up the subject.

== Epigrams and novel ==
Éparpillements (Scatterings, 1910) was Barney's first collection of pensées—literally, thoughts. This literary form had been associated with salon culture in France since the 17th century, when the genre was perfected at the salon of Madame de Sablé. Barney's pensées, like de Sablé's own Maximes, were short, often one-line epigrams or bon mots such as "There are more evil ears than bad mouths" and "To be married is to be neither alone nor together."

Remy de Gourmont with Élisabeth de Gramont and Barney in 1913. Drawing by André Rouveyre.

Her literary career got a boost after she sent a copy of Éparpillements to Remy de Gourmont, a French poet, literary critic, and philosopher who had become a recluse after contracting the disfiguring disease lupus vulgaris in his thirties. He was impressed enough to invite her to one of the Sunday gatherings at his home, at which he usually received only a small group of old friends. She was a rejuvenating influence in his life, coaxing him out for evening car rides, dinners at the Rue Jacob, a masked ball, even a short cruise on the Seine. He turned some of their wide-ranging conversations into a series of letters that he published in the Mercure de France, addressing her as l'Amazone, a French word that can mean either horsewoman or Amazon; the letters were later collected in book form. He died in 1915, but the nickname he gave her would stay with her all her life—even her tombstone identifies her as "the Amazon of Remy de Gourmont"—and his Letters to the Amazon left readers wanting to know more about the woman who had inspired them.

Barney obliged in 1920 with Pensées d'une Amazone (Thoughts of an Amazon), her most overtly political work. In the first section, "Sexual Adversity, War, and Feminism", she developed feminist and pacifist themes, describing war as an "involuntary and collective suicide ordained by man". In war, she said, men "father death as women mother life, with courage and without choice". The epigrammatic form makes it difficult to determine the details of Barney's views; ideas are presented only to be dropped, and some pensées seem to contradict others. Some critics interpret her as saying that the aggression that leads to war is visible in all male relationships. Karla Jay, however, argues that her philosophy was not that sweeping, and is better summed up by the epigram "Those who love war lack the love of an adequate sport—the art of living."

Another section of Pensées d'une Amazone, "Misunderstanding, or Sappho's Lawsuit", gathered historical writings about homosexuality along with her own commentary. She also covered topics such as alcohol, friendship, old age, and literature, writing "Novels are longer than life" and "Romanticism is a childhood ailment; those who had it young are the most robust." A third volume, Nouvelles Pensées de l'Amazone (New Thoughts of the Amazon), appeared in 1939.

The One Who is Legion, or A.D.'s After-Life (1930) was Barney's only book written entirely in English, as well as her only novel. Illustrated by Romaine Brooks, it concerns a person who committed suicide, known only as A.D., who is brought back to life as a genderless, hermaphroditic being and reads the book of their own life. This book-within-a-book, entitled The Love-Lives of A.D., is a collection of hymns, poems and epigrams, much like Barney's own other writings.

== Major relationships ==
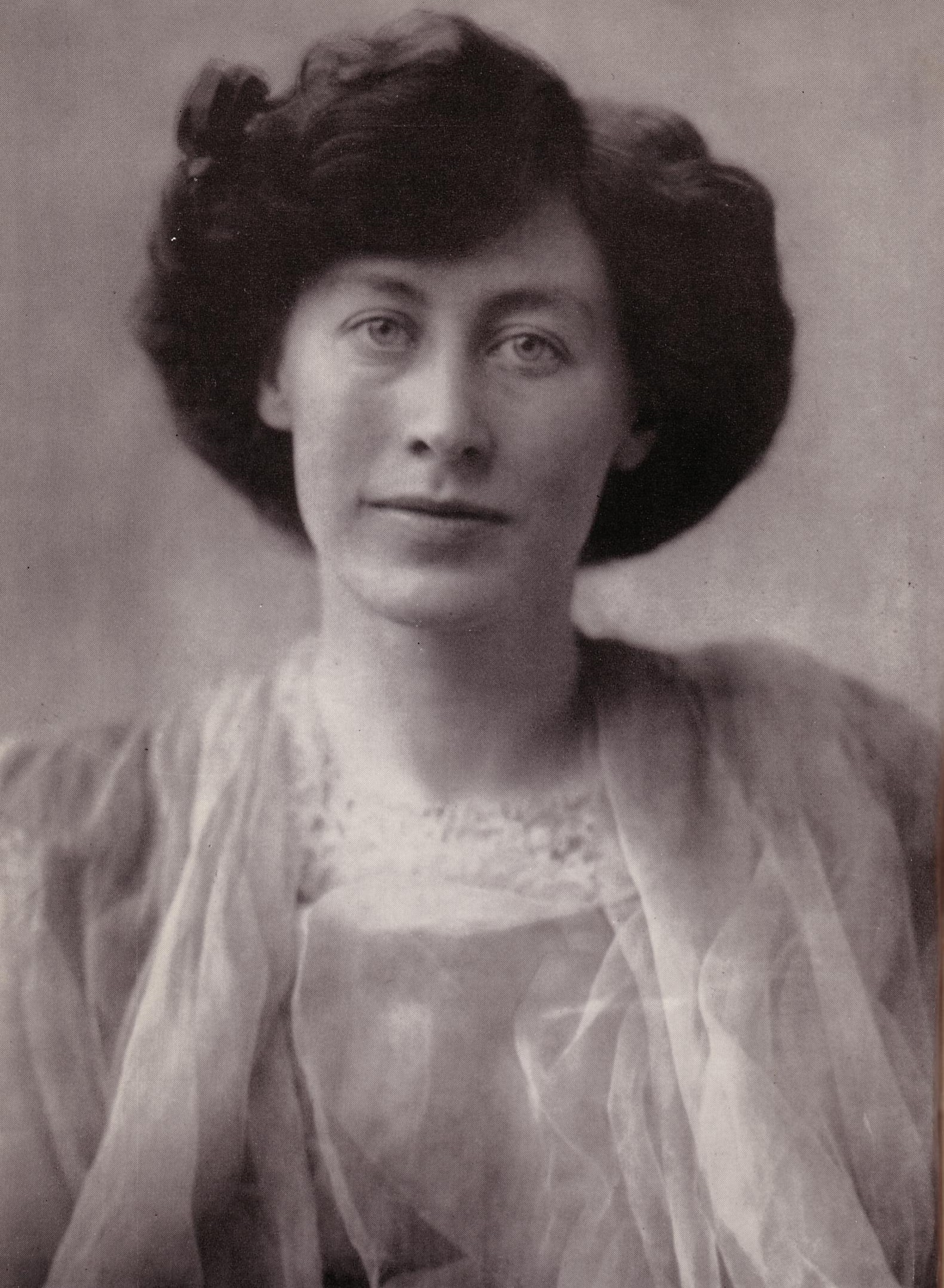
Olive Custance in 1902

Despite several of her lovers' objections, Barney practiced, and advocated, non-monogamy. As early as 1901, in Cinq Petits Dialogues Grecs, she argued in favor of multiple relationships and against jealousy; in Éparpillements she wrote "One is unfaithful to those one loves in order that their charm does not become mere habit". While she could be quite jealous herself, she actively encouraged at least some of her lovers to be non-monogamous as well.

Due in part to Jean Chalon's early biography of her, published in English as Portrait of a Seductress, Barney had become more widely known for her many relationships than for her writing or her salon. She once wrote out a list, divided into three categories: liaisons, demi-liaisons, and adventures. Colette was a demi-liaison, while the artist and furniture designer Eyre de Lanux, with whom she had an off-and-on affair for several years, was listed as an adventure. Among the liaisons—the relationships that she considered most important—were Custance, Vivien, Élisabeth de Gramont, Brooks, and Dolly Wilde. Many of her affairs, like those with Colette and Lucie Delarue-Mardrus, evolved into lifelong friendships.

=== Élisabeth de Gramont ===
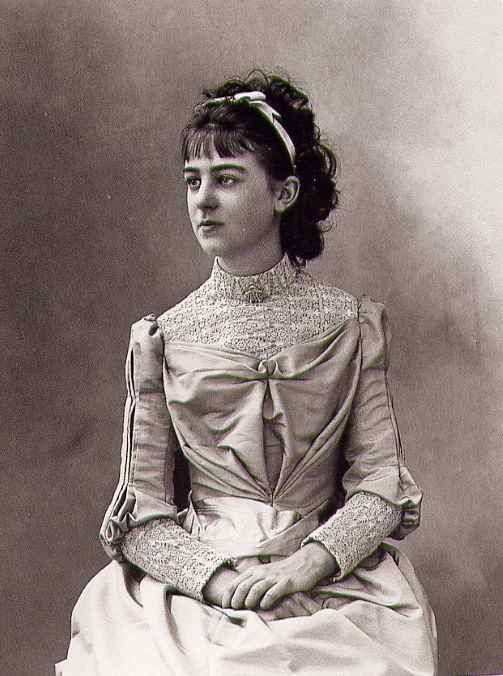
Élisabeth de Gramont in 1889

Élisabeth de Gramont, the Duchess of Clermont-Tonnerre, was a writer best known for her popular memoirs. A descendant of Henry IV of France, she had grown up among the aristocracy; when she was a child, according to Janet Flanner, "peasants on her farm ... begged her not to clean her shoes before entering their houses". Her father's ancestors had squandered their fortune and he married into the Rothschild family after her birth; she did not have any access to her step-mother's wealth. She looked back on this lost world of wealth and privilege with little regret, and became known as the "red duchess" for her support of socialism. Encouraged by her father to wed into security, she married Philibert de Clermont-Tonnere and had two daughters. He was violent and tyrannical.

The poet Lucie Delarue-Mardrus introduced Barney and de Gramont in 1909 or 1910. The couple shared academic interests and attended Remy de Gourmont's salon together. Barney wrote an unpublished novel inspired by their early relationship, L’Adultère ingénue (The Adulterous Ingénue).

De Gramont accepted Barney's nonmonogamy—perhaps reluctantly at first—and went out of her way to be gracious to her other lovers, always including Brooks when she invited Barney to vacation in the country.

Though the two conducted their affair clandestinely, de Gramont's husband found them out and attempted to stop them from seeing each other. He was unsuccessful, and he divorced de Gramont in 1920 after a period of separation. In 1918 she and Barney wrote up a marriage contract stating: "No one union shall be so strong as this union, nor another joining so tender—nor relationship so lasting". The relationship continued until de Gramont's death in 1954.

=== Romaine Brooks ===
Barney's longest relationship was with the American painter Romaine Brooks, whom she met around 1915. Brooks specialized in portraiture and was noted for her somber palette of gray, black, and white. During the 1920s she painted portraits of several members of Barney's social circle, including de Gramont and Barney herself.

Barney and Romaine Brooks, circa 1915

Brooks tolerated Barney's casual affairs well enough to tease her about them, and had a few of her own over the years, but could become jealous when a new love became serious. Usually she simply left town, but at one point she gave Barney an ultimatum to choose between her and Dolly Wilde—relenting once Barney had given in. At the same time, while Brooks was devoted to Barney, she did not want to live with her as a full-time couple; she disliked Paris, disdained Barney's friends, hated the constant socializing on which Barney thrived, and felt that she was fully herself only when alone. To accommodate Brooks's need for solitude they built a summer home consisting of two separate wings joined by a dining room, which they called Villa Trait d'Union, the hyphenated villa. Brooks also spent much of the year in Italy or travelling elsewhere in Europe, away from Barney. Their relationship lasted for over fifty years.

=== Dolly Wilde ===
Dolly Wilde was the niece of Oscar Wilde and the last of her family to bear the Wilde name. She was renowned for her epigrammatic wit but, unlike her famous uncle, never managed to apply her gifts to any publishable writing; her letters are her only legacy. She did some work as a translator and was often supported by others, including Barney, whom she met in 1927.

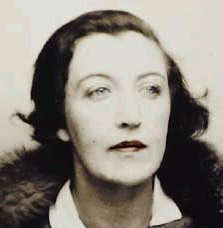
Dolly Wilde in 1925

Barney's support of Wilde included occasional permission to stay for a few weeks at Rue Jacob. Brooks' disapproval of the relationship increased over the years, aggravated by Wilde's presence in Barney's home. Wilde, the only of Barney's loves to share her enthusiastic rejection of monogamy, strove conscientiously but futilely for Brooks' favor. This culminated in Brooks' ultimatum, delivered in 1931, in which she described Wilde as a rat "gnawing at the very foundation of our friendship". Barney chose Brooks and separated from Wilde; Brooks later allowed Wilde to return and became less critical of Wilde's ways.

Like Vivien, Wilde was intensely self-destructive and struggled deeply with mental illness. She attempted suicide several times, and spent much of her life addicted to alcohol and heroin. Barney, a vocal opponent of drug use and alcoholism, financed drug detoxifications several times; to no avail. Wilde even emerged from one nursing-home stay with a new dependency on the sleeping draught paraldehyde, then available over-the-counter.

In 1939, she was diagnosed with breast cancer and refused surgery, seeking alternative treatments. The following year, World War II separated her from Barney; she fled Paris for England while Barney went to Italy with Brooks. She died in 1941 from causes never fully explained; with one of the most common speculations being a paraldehyde overdose. Her will, written in 1932, named Barney as her only heir.

== World War II and after ==
Barney's attitudes during World War II have been controversial. In 1937, Una, Lady Troubridge, complained that Barney "talked a lot of half-baked nonsense about the tyranny of fascism". Barney herself had Jewish heritage, and since she spent the war in Florence with Brooks, was investigated by Italian authorities because of this; she was able to escape their attention after her sister Laura arranged for a notarized document attesting to her confirmation.

Nevertheless, she believed Axis propaganda that portrayed the Allies as the aggressors. Therefore, pro-Fascism seemed to her to be a logical consequence of her pacifism. An unpublished memoir she wrote during the war years is pro-Fascist and anti-Semitic, quoting speeches by Hitler, apparently with approval.

It is possible that the anti-Semitic passages in her memoir were intended to be used as evidence that she was not Jewish; alternatively, she may have been influenced by Ezra Pound's anti-Semitic radio broadcasts. Whatever the case, she did help a Jewish couple escape Italy, providing passage on a ship to the United States. By the end of the war her sympathies had again changed, and she saw the Allies as liberators.

Villa Trait d'Union was destroyed by bombing. After the war, Brooks declined to live with Barney in Paris; she remained in Italy, and they visited each other frequently. Their relationship remained mostly monogamous until the mid-1950s, when Barney met her last new love, Janine Lahovary, the wife of a retired Romanian ambassador. Lahovary made a point of winning Brooks's friendship, Barney reassured Brooks that their relationship still came first, and the triangle appeared to be stable.

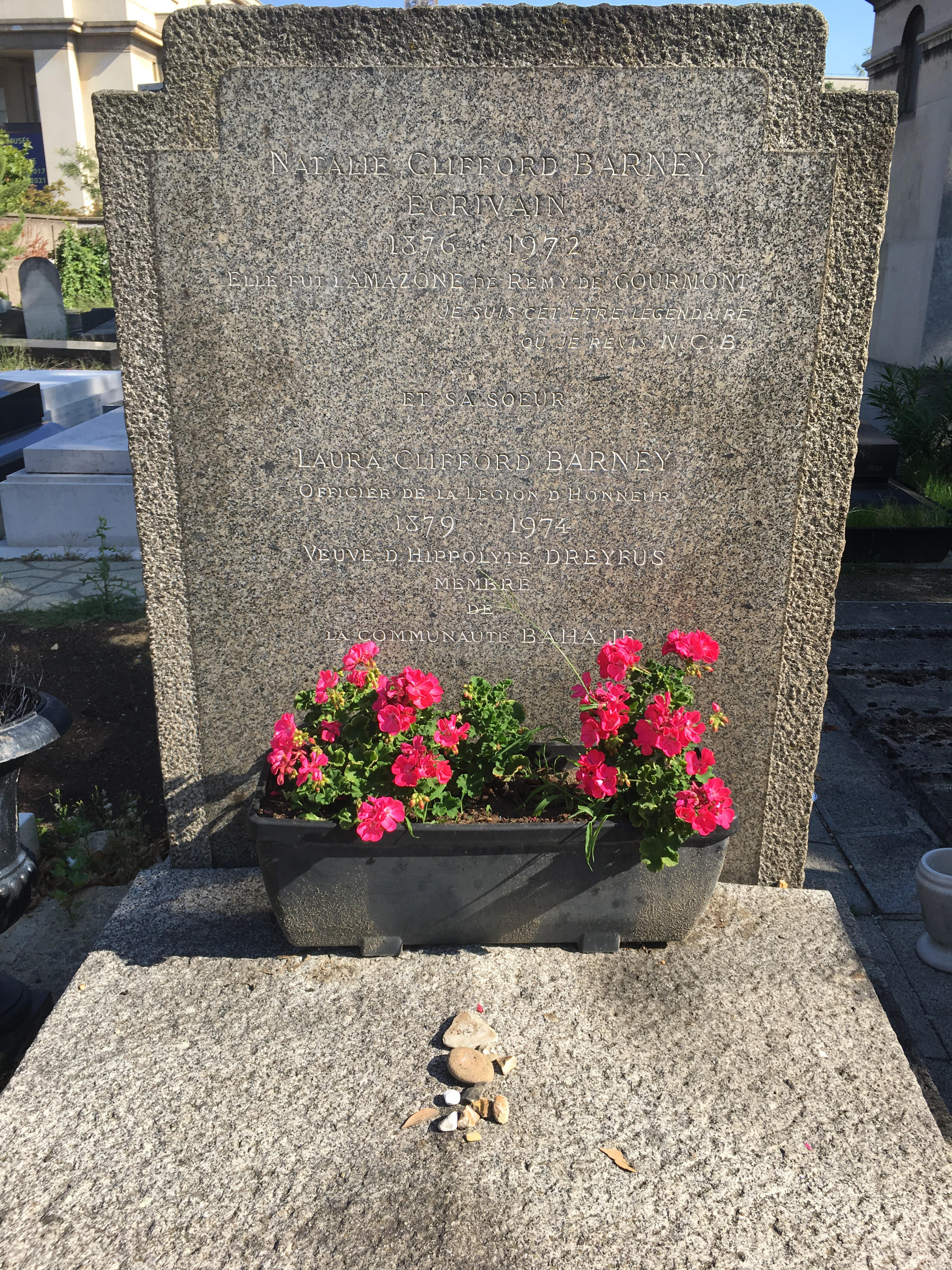
Barney's grave

The salon resumed in 1949 and continued to attract young writers for whom it was as much a piece of history as a place where literary reputations were made. Truman Capote was an intermittent guest for almost ten years; he described the decor as "totally turn-of-the-century" and remembered that Barney introduced him to the models for several characters in Marcel Proust's In Search of Lost Time.

Alice B. Toklas became a regular after her partner Stein's death in 1946. Fridays in the 1960s honored Mary McCarthy and Marguerite Yourcenar, who in 1980—eight years after Barney's death—became the first female member of the French Academy.

Barney did not return to writing epigrams, but did publish two volumes of memoirs about other writers she had known, Souvenirs Indiscrets (Indiscreet Memories, 1960) and Traits et Portraits (Traits and Portraits, 1963). She also worked to find a publisher for Brooks's memoirs and to place her paintings in galleries.

In the late 1960s Brooks became increasingly reclusive and paranoid; she sank into a depression and refused to see the doctors Barney sent. Bitter at Lahovary's presence during their last years, which she had hoped they would spend exclusively together, she finally broke off contact with Barney. Barney continued to write to her, but received no replies. Brooks died in December 1970, and Barney on February 2, 1972, aged 95, from heart failure. She is buried at Passy Cemetery, Paris, Île-de-France, France. She left some of her writing, including more than 40,000 letters, to the Bibliothèque littéraire Jacques-Doucet in Paris.

== Legacy ==
By the end of Natalie Barney's life her work had been largely forgotten. In 1979, Barney was honored with a place setting in Judy Chicago's feminist work of art The Dinner Party. In the 1980s Barney began to be recognized for what Karla Jay calls an "almost uncanny anticipation" of the concerns of later feminist writers. English translations of some of her memoirs, essays, and epigrams appeared in 1992, but most of her plays and poetry are untranslated.

Her indirect influence on literature, through her salon and her many literary friendships, can be seen in the number of writers who have addressed or portrayed her in their works. Claudine s'en va (Claudine and Annie, 1903) by Colette contains a brief appearance by Barney as "Miss Flossie", echoing the nickname she had earlier been given in de Pougy's novel Idylle Saphique. Renée Vivien wrote many poems about her, as well as a Symbolist novel, Une femme m'apparut (A Woman Appeared to Me, 1904), in which Barney is described as having "eyes ... as sharp and blue as a blade ... The charm of peril emanated from her and drew me inexorably." Remy de Gourmont addressed her in his Letters to the Amazon, and Truman Capote mentioned her in his last, unfinished novel Answered Prayers. She also appeared in later novels by writers who never met her. Anna Livia's Minimax (1991) portrays both Barney and Renée Vivien as still-living vampires. Francesco Rapazzini's Un soir chez l'Amazone (2001) is a historical novel about Barney's salon. The English translation by Sally Hamilton and Suzanne Stroh was published as an audiobook read by Suzanne Stroh under the title A Night at the Amazon's (2020).

Barney appears in Hall's The Well of Loneliness as the salon hostess Valérie Seymour, a symbol of self-acceptance in contrast with the protagonist's self hatred. Hall wrote: "Valérie, placid and self-assured, created an atmosphere of courage; everyone felt very normal and brave when they gathered together at Valérie Seymour's." According to Lillian Faderman, "There was probably no lesbian in the four decades between 1928 and the late 1960s capable of reading English or any of the eleven languages into which the book was translated who was unfamiliar with The Well of Loneliness."

Lucie Delarue-Mardrus wrote love poems to Barney in the early years of the century, and in 1930 depicted her in a novel, L'Ange et les Pervers (The Angel and the Perverts), in which she said she "analyzed and described Natalie at length as well as the life into which she initiated me". The protagonist of the novel is a hermaphrodite named Marion who lives a double life, frequenting literary salons in female dress, then changing from skirt to trousers to attend gay soirées. Barney is Laurette Wells, a salon hostess who spends much of the novel trying to win back an ex-lover loosely based on Renée Vivien. The book's portrayal of her is, at times, harshly critical, but she is the only person whose company Marion enjoys. Marion tells Wells that she is "perverse ... dissolute, self-centered, unfair, stubborn, sometimes miserly ... [but] a genuine rebel, ever ready to incite others to rebellion .... [Y]ou are capable of loving someone just as they are, even a thief—in that lies your only fidelity. And so you have my respect."

After meeting Barney in the 1930s, the Russian poet Marina Ivanovna Tsvetaeva addressed her in a Letter to the Amazon (1934) in which she expressed her conflicted feelings about love between women. The result, according to Terry Castle, is "an entirely cryptic, paranoid, overwhelming piece of reverie".

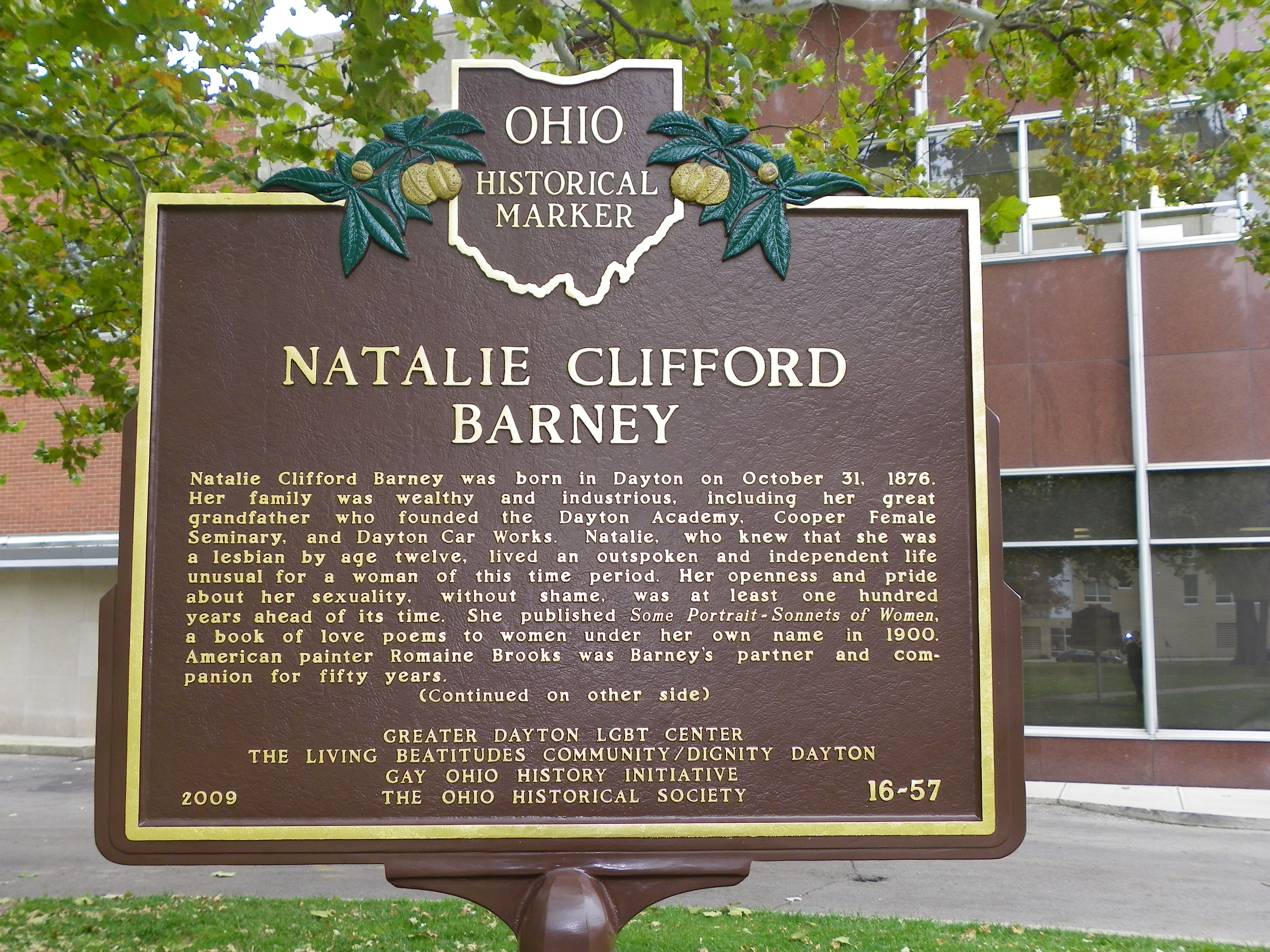
Historical marker honoring Barney, in Dayton's Cooper Park

Barney and the women in her social circle are the subject of Djuna Barnes's Ladies Almanack (1928), a roman à clef written in an archaic, Rabelaisian style, with Barnes's own illustrations in the style of Elizabethan woodcuts. She has the lead role as Dame Evangeline Musset, "who was in her Heart one Grand Red Cross for the Pursuance, the Relief and the Distraction, of such Girls as in their Hinder Parts, and their Fore Parts, and in whatsoever Parts did suffer them most, lament Cruelly". "[A] Pioneer and a Menace" in her youth, Dame Musset has reached "a witty and learned Fifty"; she rescues women in distress, dispenses wisdom, and upon her death is elevated to sainthood. Also appearing pseudonymously are de Gramont, Brooks, Dolly Wilde, Hall and her partner Una, Lady Troubridge, Janet Flanner and Solita Solano, and Mina Loy. The obscure language, inside jokes, and ambiguity of Ladies Almanack have kept critics arguing about whether it is an affectionate satire or a bitter attack, but Barney herself loved the book and reread it throughout her life.

On October 26, 2009, Barney was honored with a historical marker in her home town of Dayton, Ohio. The marker is the first in Ohio to note the sexual orientation of its honoree.

Barney's French novel, Amants féminins ou la troisième, believed to have been written in 1926, was published in 2013. It was translated into English by Chelsea Ray and published in 2016 as Women Lovers or The Third Woman.

== Works ==
=== In French ===
- Quelques Portraits-Sonnets de Femmes (Paris: Paul Ollendorff, 1900)
- Cinq Petits Dialogues Grecs (Paris: La Plume, 1901; as "Tryphé")
- Actes et entr'actes (Paris: Sansot, 1910)
- Je me souviens (Paris: Sansot, 1910)
- Eparpillements (Paris: Sansot, 1910)
- Pensées d'une Amazone (Paris: Émile-Paul Frères, 1920)
- Aventures de l'Esprit (Paris: Émile-Paul Frères, 1929)
- Nouvelles Pensées de l'Amazone (Paris: Mercure de France, 1939)
- Souvenirs Indiscrets (Paris: Flammarion, 1960)
- Traits et Portraits (Paris: Mercure de France, 1963)
- Amants féminins ou la troisième (Paris: ErosOnyx, 2013)
- Lettres à une Connue (Paris: Éditions Bartillat, 2024)

=== In English ===
- Poems & Poèmes: Autres Alliances (Paris: Emile Paul, New York: Doran, 1920) – bilingual collection of poetry
- The One Who Is Legion (London: Eric Partridge, Ltd., 1930; Orono, Maine: National Poetry Foundation, 1987) facsimile reprint with an afterword by Edward Lorusso

=== English translations ===
- Livia, Anna, ed. (1992). A Perilous Advantage: The Best of Natalie Clifford Barney. Translated by Livia, Anna. Norwich, Vermont: New Victoria Publishers. ISBN 978-0-934678-45-2. OCLC 25675501.
- Jay, Carla, ed. (1992). Adventures of the Mind. Translated by Gatton, John Spalding. New York: New York University Press. ISBN 978-0-8147-8728-1. JSTOR j.ctt9qfrjz. OCLC 906938542.
- Ray, Chelsea, ed. (2016). Women Lovers, or The Third woman. Translated by Ray, Chelsea. Madison, Wisconsin: The University of Wisconsin Press. ISBN 978-0-299-30693-9. OCLC 956320847.
- Pious, Samantha, ed. (2025). Selected Poems. Translated by Pious, Samantha. Sequim, Washington: Headmistress Press. ISBN 979-8987763674.
- Stroh, Suzanne, ed. (2025). I Remember Her. Translated by Stroh, Suzanne. Sequim, Washington: Headmistress Press. ISBN 979-8987763667.

== See also ==
- LGBT culture in Paris
- Renée Vivien Prize
- List of poets portraying sexual relations between women
