= Quelques Portraits-Sonnets de Femmes =

1900 book by Natalie Clifford Barney

- First edition cover
- Author: Natalie Clifford Barney
- Language: French
- Genre: Poetry
- Publisher: Library Paul Ollendorf
- Publication date: 1900
- Publication place: United States
- Media type: Print (Chapbook)
- Pages: 66

Quelques Portraits-Sonnets de Femmes is a poetry chapbook, by Natalie Clifford Barney, with watercolor illustrations by Alice Pike Barney. It was published in an edition of 500, by Librarie Paul Ollendorf. The poems were dedicated to various women, by initials. The poems were criticized for being conventional. However, the radical subject matter of lesbianism caused a scandal. Her father, Alfred Barney, bought up the copies and plates.
