= Liliane Wouters =

Belgian poet and playwright (1930–2016)

- Born: 5 February 1930; Ixelles, Belgium
- Died: 28 February 2016 (aged 86)
- Occupations: Anthologist, essayist, playwright, poet, teacher, translator

Liliane Wouters (5 February 1930 – 28 February 2016) was a Belgian poet, playwright, translator, anthologist and essayist.

== Life ==
Wouters was born in Ixelles, Belgium, and taught school from 1949 to 1990. She met Albert Andrew Lheureux and his Théâtre de l'Esprit Frappeur.

She was a Member of the Royal Academy of French Language and Literature of Belgium and the European Academy of Poetry.

== Awards ==
- 1955: Prix Renée Vivien
- 1961: Triennial Prize for Poetry
- Montaigne Prize, Foundation Friedrich von Schiller (Hamburg)
- 2000: Prix Goncourt for poetry
- 2000: Five Year Award for Literature

== Works ==
=== English translations ===
- "To the child I did not have", Sedulia
- Rocking to the North Wind. Translated by Anne-Marie Glasheen. Daedalus. 2001. ISBN 978-1-901233-57-5.
- Renée Linkhorn; Judy Cochran, eds. (2000). Belgian women poets: an anthology. P. Lang. ISBN 978-0-8204-4456-7.
- Anne-Marie Glasheen, ed. (1998). The key to our aborted dreams: five plays by contemporary Belgian women writers. Translated by Anne-Marie Glasheen. P. Lang. ISBN 978-0-8204-3769-9.

=== French language ===
- La Marche forcée, poésie, Bruxelles: Éditions des Artistes, Georges Houyoux, 1954.
- Le Bois sec, poésie, Paris: Gallimard, 1960.
- Belles heures de Flandre, adaptation de poèmes (Poésie flamande du Moyen-Âge), Paris: Pierre Seghers, 1961 (reissued. Bruxelles: Éditions Les Éperonniers, coll. "Passé-Présent", 1997).
- Oscarine ou les tournesols, théâtre, création du Rideau de Bruxelles, 1964.
- Guido Gezelle, essai et adaptation de poèmes, Paris: Pierre Seghers, coll. «Poètes d'aujourd'hui», 1965.
- Le Gel, poetry, Paris: Pierre Seghers, 1966.
- La Porte, théâtre, création Festival du Jeune Théâtre, Liège, 1967.
- Bréviaire des Pays-Bas, adaptation de poèmes (Poésie flamande du Moyen-Age), Paris: Éditions Universitaires, 1973.
- Reynart le Goupil, adaptation du poème du moyen néerlandais, Bruxelles: Éditions La Renaissance du Livre, 1974.
- Panorama de la poésie française de Belgique, anthology, Bruxelles: Éditions Jacques Antoine, 1976.
- Vies et morts de Mademoiselle Shakespeare, théâtre, création Théâtre de l'Esprit Frappeur, Bruxelles, 1979.
- Terre d'écarts, anthology, in collaboration with André Miguel, Paris: Éditions Universitaires, 1980.
- La Célestine, adaptation (d'après Fernando de Rojas), théâtre, Théâtre Royal du Parc, Bruxelles, 1981.
- Le monument (un acte du spectacle collectif Le 151e), théâtre, Maison de la Culture de Mons, 1981.
- La mort de Cléopâtre (un acte du spectacle collectif Cléopâtre), théâtre, Théâtre de l'Esprit Frappeur, Bruxelles, 1982.
- Autour d'une dame de qualité, pièce en un acte, théâtre, création Atelier d'écriture, Neufchâteau, 1983.
- La salle des profs, théâtre, création Maison de la Culture de Mons, Théâtre de l'Esprit Frappeur, Bruxelles: Éditions Jacques Antoine, 1983 (reissued Bruxelles: Éditions Labor).
- L'Aloès, poetry, Paris: Luneau-Ascot, 1983.
- Parenthèse, poetry, Le Verbe et l'Empreinte, Saint-Laurent-du-Pont (France), 1984.
- Ça rime et ça rame, anthology for young readers, Bruxelles: Éditions Labor, 1985. ISBN 978-2-8040-2226-6
- L'Équateur, théâtre, création Théâtre de l'Esprit frappeur (Botanique), 1986.
- L'Équateur, suivi de Vies et Morts de Mademoiselle Shakespeare, théâtre, Bruxelles: Éditions Jacques Antoine, 1986.
- Charlotte ou la nuit mexicaine, théâtre, Bruxelles: Éditions Les Éperonniers, 1989.
- Journal du scribe, poetry, Bruxelles: Les Éperonniers, 1990.
- Le jour du Narval, théâtre, Bruxelles: Éditions Les Éperonniers, 1991.
- La poésie francophone de Belgique, with Alain Bosquet, anthology, 4 vols, Bruxelles: Éditions de l'ARLLFB, 1992.
- Tous les chemins conduisent à la mer, poetry, Bruxelles, Les Eperonniers, coll. «Passé Présent», 1997.
- Un compagnon pour toutes les saisons, traduction, Guido Gezelle, Autres Temps, Marseille, 1999.
- Le Billet de Pascal, poetry, Luxembourg: Éditions Phi, 2000.
- Le siècle des femmes, with Yves Namur, anthology, Bruxelles: Éditions Les Éperonniers, 2000.
- Changer d'écorce, poetry, Tournai: La Renaissance du Livre, 2001.
- Poètes aujourd'hui: un panorama de la poésie francophone de Belgique (with Yves Namur), anthology,
- Châtelineau/Saint-Hippolyte, Le Taillis pré/Le Noroît, 2007.
- Paysages flamands avec nonnes, memoirs, Paris: Gallimard, 2007.
- Le Livre du Soufi, poetry, Châtelineau: Le Taillis Pré, 2009.
