= Anne-Marie de Backer =

French poet and translator (1908–1987)

- Born: 1908
- Died: 1987 (aged 78–79)
- Writing career
- Language: French
- Genre: poetry

Anne-Marie de Backer (1908–1987) was a French poet and translator. She was awarded the Renée Vivien Prize for female poets in 1959.

== Works ==
- Le Vent des rues, Paris, Seghers, Prix Artaud 1952.
- Danse du cygne noir, Paris, Seghers, 1954.
- Les Étoiles de novembre, Préf. de Louis Émié, Paris, Seghers, 1956.
- L'Herbe et le feu, Paris, Seghers, 1958.
- La Dame d'Elche, Paris, Seghers, 1963.
- Étoile Lucifer, Paris, Seghers, 1967.
- Orties aux flammes bleues, 1975.
- Le Soleil du grand vent, Rodez, Subervie, Coll. Le Miroir, 1981.
