= Alice Pike Barney =

American painter

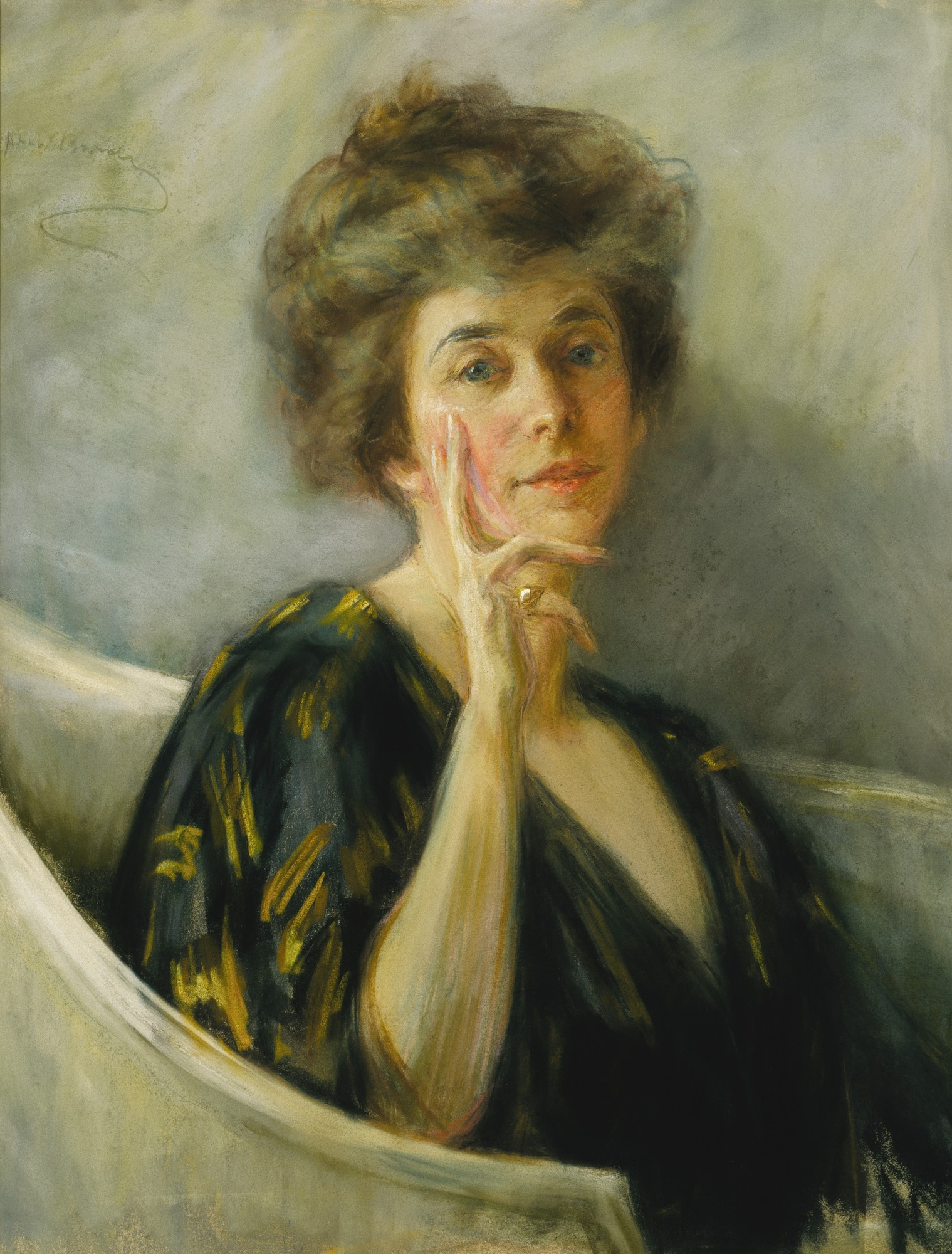
- Self-Portrait in Repose, 1895
- Born: Alice Pike; January 14, 1857; Cincinnati, Ohio, U.S.
- Died: October 12, 1931 (aged 74); Los Angeles, California, U.S.
- Known for: Painting
- Spouses: Albert Clifford Barney; Christian Hemmick
- Children: Natalie Clifford Barney; Laura Clifford Barney

Alice Pike Barney (born Alice Pike; January 14, 1857– October 12, 1931) was an American painter. She was active in Washington, D.C., and worked to make Washington into a center of the arts. Her two daughters were the writer and salon hostess Natalie Clifford Barney and the Baháʼí writer Laura Clifford Barney.

== Early life ==
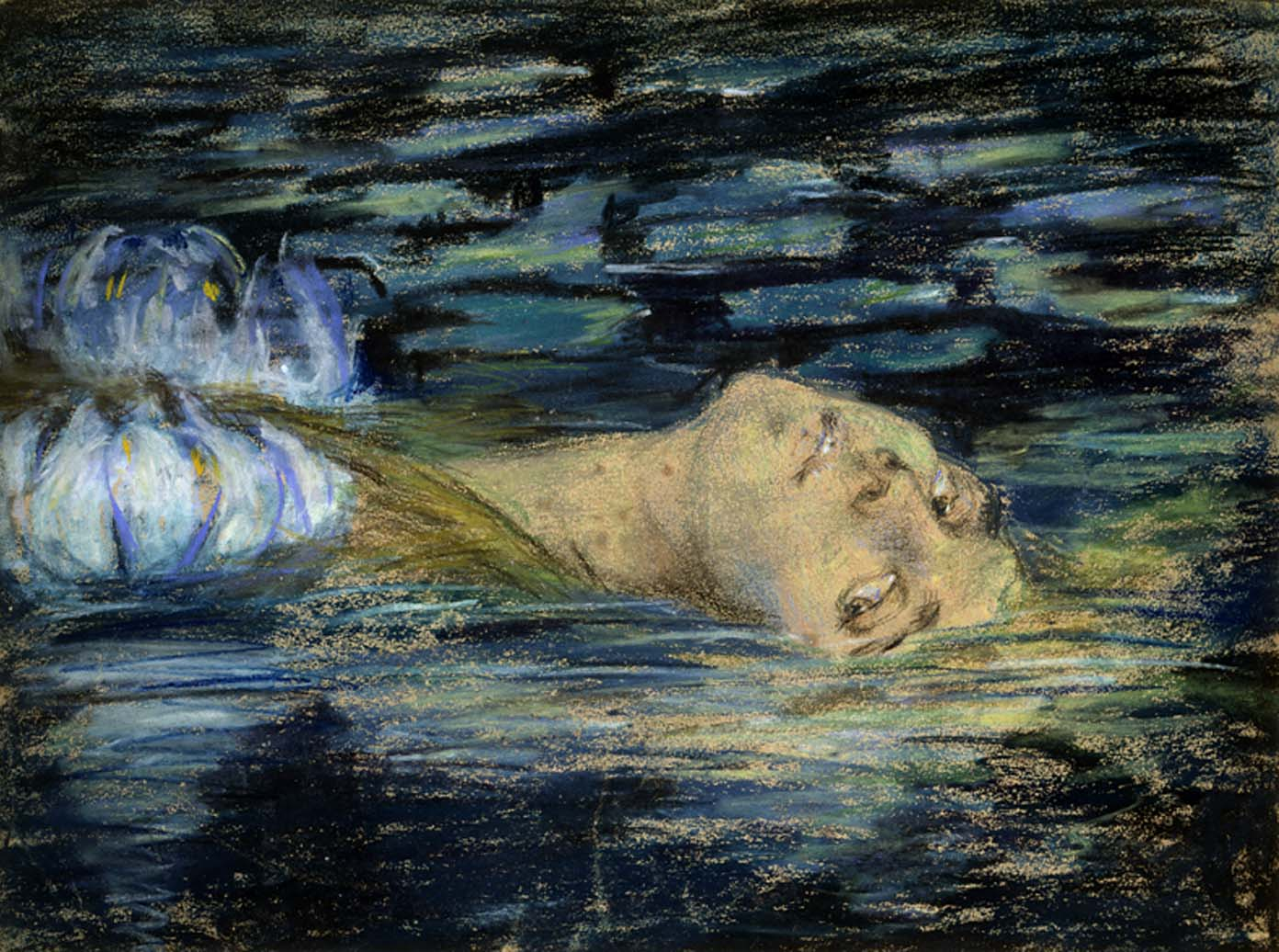
Waterlily, 1900, was one of Barney's illustrations for her daughter's chapbook. The model was Barney's niece Ellen Goin.

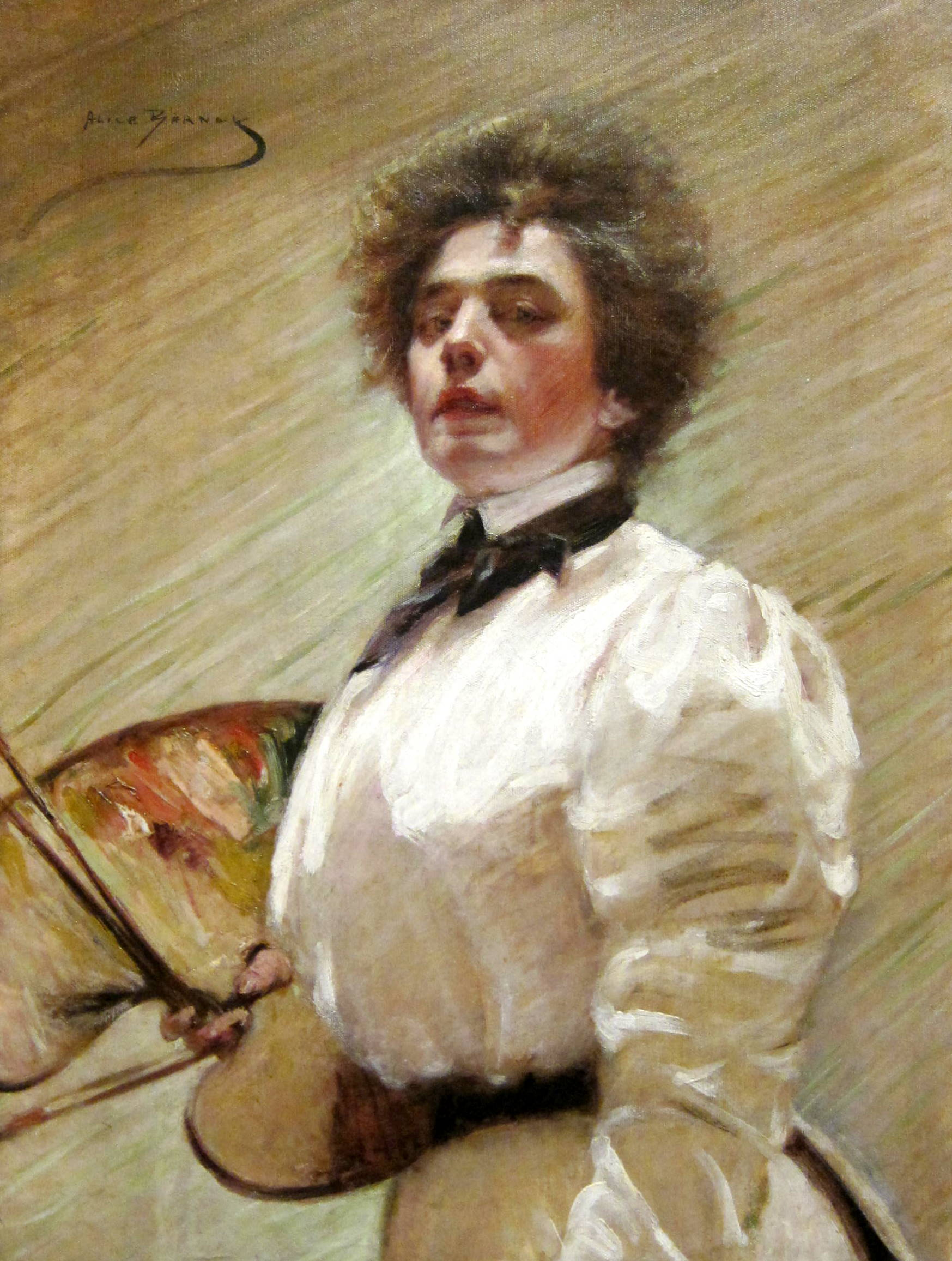
Self-Portrait with Palette, 1906

Barney's father Samuel Napthali Pike, who had made his fortune as the distiller of Magnolia brand whiskey, was a patron of the arts in Cincinnati, Ohio, where he built Pike's Opera House. His father was a German Jew, and his mother a Dutch Christian. Alice Pike Barney's mother was of French descent. After the family moved to New York City in 1866, he built what would become the Grand Opera House at Twenty-Third Street and Eighth Avenue. Barney was the youngest of four children and the only one who fully shared her father's cultural interests; as a child she showed talent as a singer and pianist.

At 17 she became engaged to the explorer Henry Morton Stanley. Alice's mother considered the match unsuitable due to the age difference – she was 17, he 33 – and insisted that they wait to marry. While he was away on a three-year expedition in Africa (he named the boat in which he circled Lake Victoria The Lady Alice), she instead married Albert Clifford Barney, son of the wealthy Eliam Eliakim Barney, a manufacturer of railway cars, Barney and Smith Car Company, in Dayton, Ohio.

In 1882 Barney and her family spent the summer at New York City's Long Beach Hotel, where Oscar Wilde happened to be speaking on his American lecture tour. Wilde spent the day with Alice and her daughter Natalie on the beach; their conversation changed the course of Alice's life, inspiring her to pursue art seriously despite her husband's disapproval.

== New Woman ==
As educational opportunities were made more available in the 19th-century, women artists became part of professional enterprises, including founding their own art associations. Artwork made by women was considered to be inferior, and to help overcome that stereotype women became "increasingly vocal and confident" in promoting women's work, and thus became part of the emerging image of the educated, modern and freer "New Woman". Artists "played crucial roles in representing the New Woman, both by drawing images of the icon and exemplifying this emerging type through their own lives." In the late 19th-century and early 20th century about 88% of the subscribers of 11,000 magazines and periodicals were women.

== Study of art ==
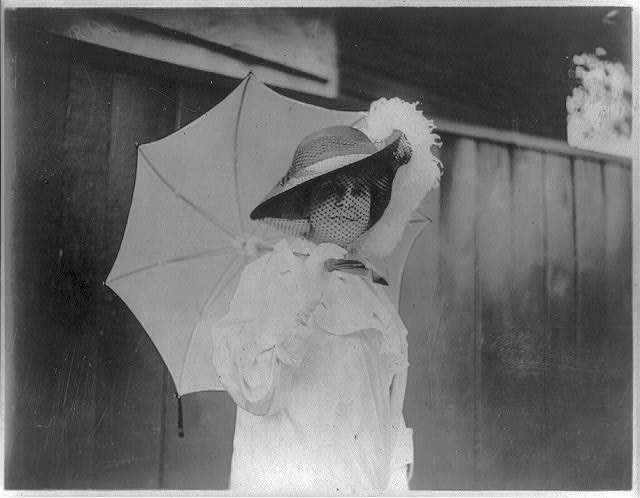
Alice Pike Barney, around 1920.

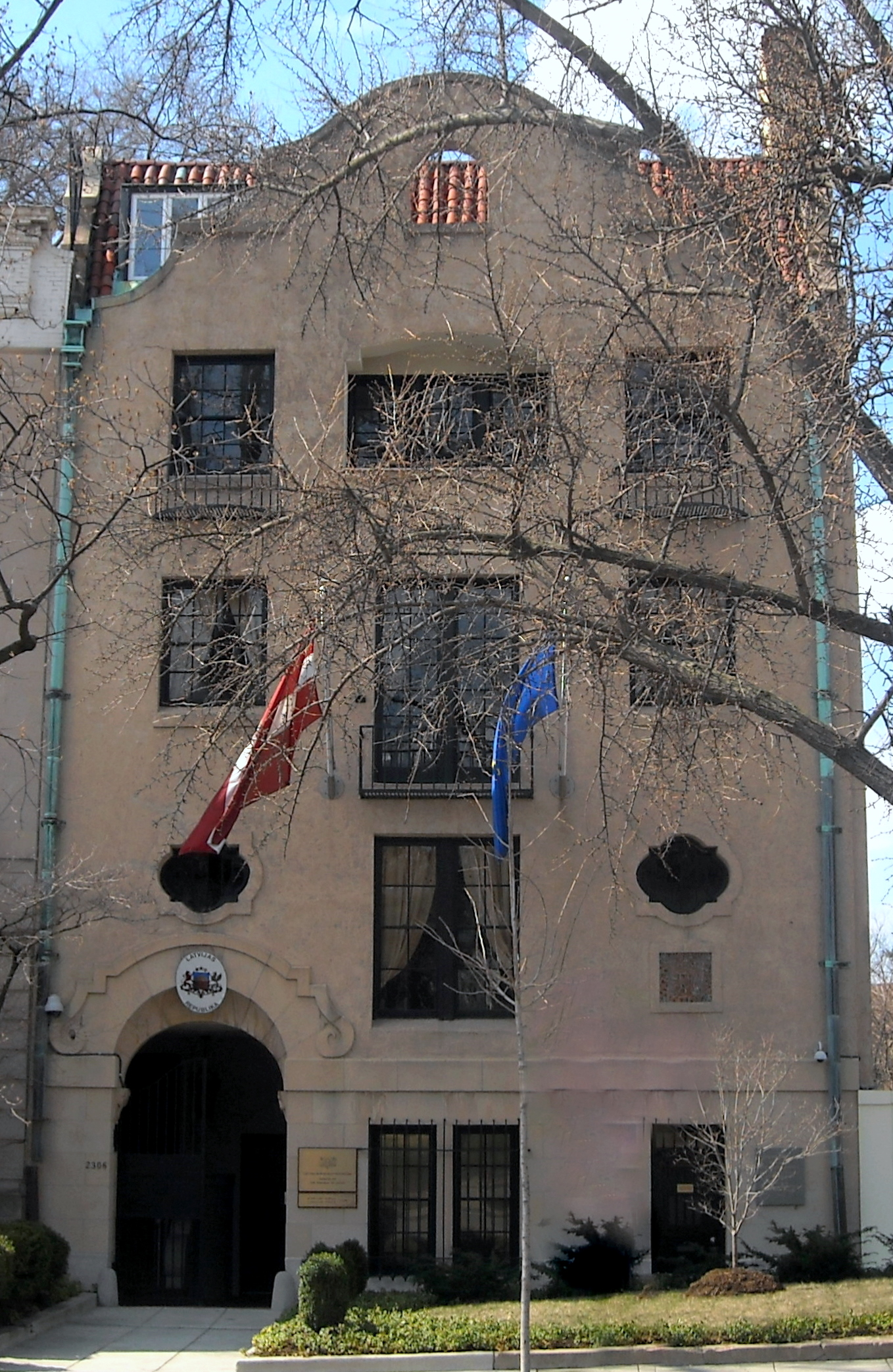
The Alice Pike Barney Studio House (now the Embassy of Latvia) is listed on the National Register of Historic Places.

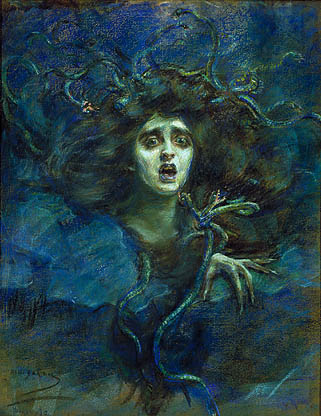
Medusa, 1892 (model: Laura Clifford Barney)

In 1887 she travelled to Paris to be nearer her two daughters while they attended Les Ruches, a French boarding school founded by the feminist educator Marie Souvestre. While there, she studied painting with Carolus-Duran. She returned to Paris in 1896 – bringing her daughter Laura to a French hospital for treatment of leg pain from a childhood injury – and resumed her study with Carolus-Duran as well as taking lessons from the Spanish painter Claudio Castelucho. When James Abbott McNeill Whistler opened the Académie Carmen in 1898, she was one of the first students. Whistler soon lost interest in teaching art and the school shut down, but he was a formative influence.

In 1899 she began a salon at her rented home on the Avenue Victor Hugo; regular guests included the Symbolist painters Lucien Lévy-Dhurmer, John White Alexander, and Edmond Aman-Jean, and her art began to show a Symbolist influence.

When Natalie wrote a chapbook of French poetry, Quelques Portraits-Sonnets de Femmes (Some Portrait-Sonnets of Women), Barney was pleased to provide illustrations. She did not understand the implications of the book's love poems addressed to women and had no idea that three of the four women who modeled for her were her daughter's lovers. Albert, alerted to the book's theme by a newspaper review headlined "Sappho Sings in Washington", rushed to Paris, where he bought and destroyed the publisher's remaining stock and printing plates and insisted that Barney and Natalie return with him to the family's summer home in Bar Harbor, Maine. His temper only worsened when friends forwarded him clippings from the Washington Mirror.

Washington, about to publish its first Social Register, was becoming more socially stratified, and Barney's background as the daughter of a whiskey distiller and granddaughter of a Jewish immigrant had made her the subject of vague insinuations in the society pages. The gossip would have no lasting effect on the Barneys' social standing, but Albert considered it a disaster. His drinking increased, as did his blood pressure, and two months later he had a heart attack. His health continued to deteriorate, and he died in 1902.

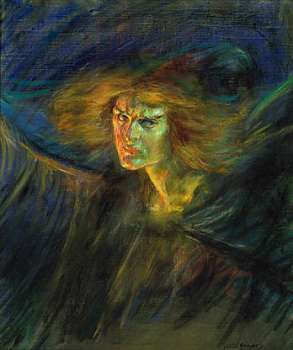
Lucifer, 1902 (model Natalie Clifford Barney)

Barney had solo shows at major galleries including the Corcoran Gallery of Art. In later years, she invented and patented mechanical devices, wrote and performed in several plays and an opera, and worked to promote the arts in Washington, D.C., Many of her paintings are now in the collection of the Smithsonian American Art Museum.

She converted to the Baháʼí Faith around 1900.

== Later life ==
In 1911, at age 53, Barney married 23-year-old Christian Hemmick, the son of Roland J Hemmick, the ambassador to Switzerland. Barney had painted Christian's sister Katherine Marie Johnson. Their engagement resulted in worldwide press attention. They had divorced by 1920.

== See also ==
- National Sylvan Theater
- Alice Pike Barney Studio House

== Bibliography ==
- Kling, Jean L. (1994). Alice Pike Barney: Her Life and Art. Washington, DC: Smithsonian Institution Press. ISBN 978-1-56098-344-6.
- Rodriguez, Suzanne (2002). Wild Heart: A Life: Natalie Clifford Barney and the Decadence of Literary Paris. New York: HarperCollins. p. 163. ISBN 0-06-093780-7.
- Prieto, Laura R. (2001). At Home in the Studio: The Professionalization of Women Artists in America. Harvard University Press. p. 145. ISBN 978-0-674-00486-3.
