= Laura Clifford Barney =

American Baháʼí teacher and philanthropist

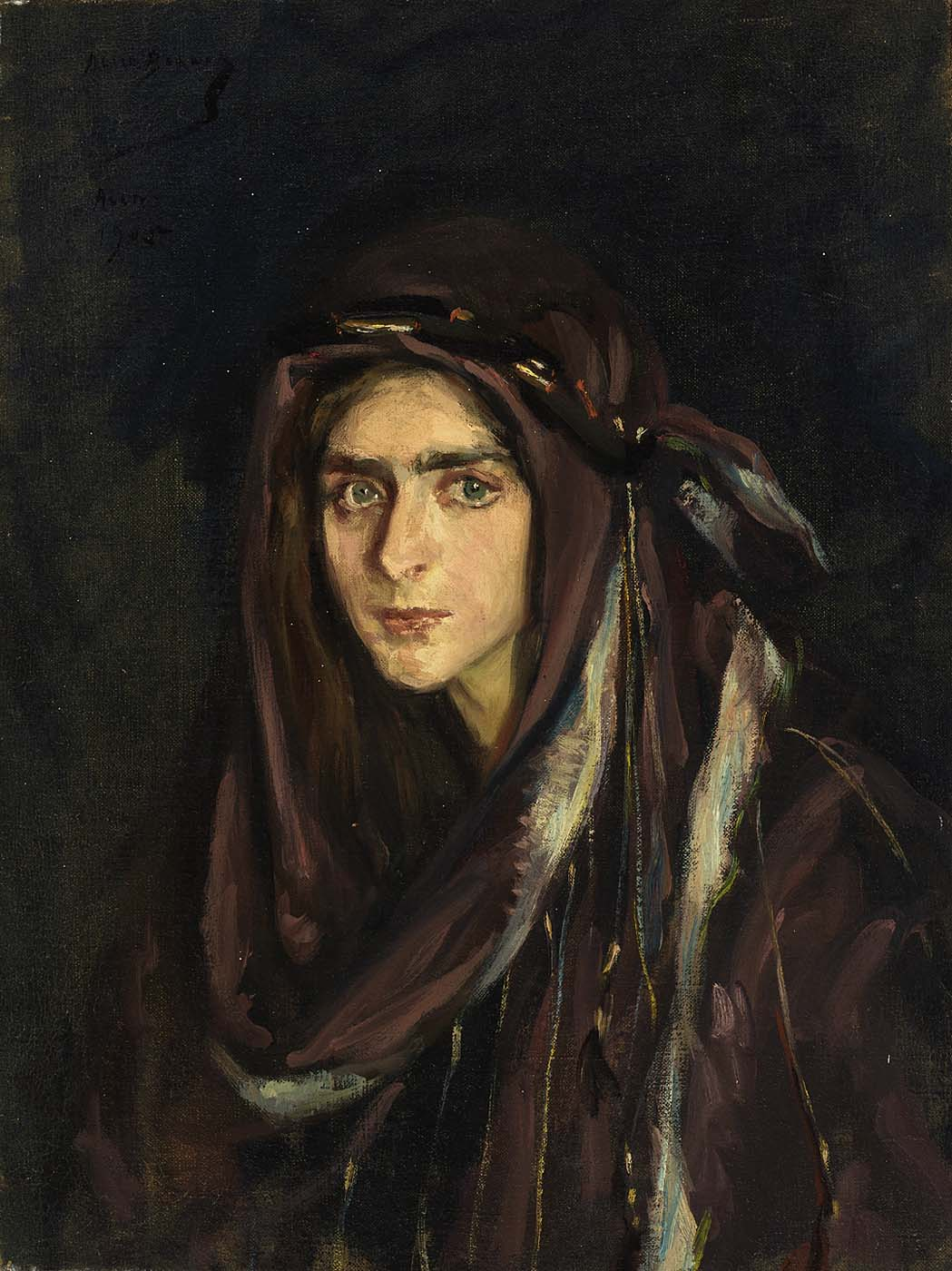
Laura in Arabian costume (1905), by Alice Pike Barney

Laura Dreyfus-Barney (born Laura Clifford Barney; 30 November 1879 – 18 August 1974) was a sculptor and a leading American Baháʼí teacher and philanthropist.

She was the daughter of Albert and Alice Pike Barney. Albert Clifford Barney was the son of a manufacturer of railway cars and was of English descent. Alice was of French, Dutch and German-Jewish ancestry, and was a socially prominent artist from Washington, D.C. Laura and her elder sister Natalie Clifford Barney were educated by private tutors. Laura became a leading American Baháʼí teacher and philanthropist. She is best known for having compiled the Baháʼí text Some Answered Questions from her interviews with ʻAbdu'l-Bahá during her visit to ʿAkkāʾ, Palestine, between 1904 and 1906.

== Activities ==
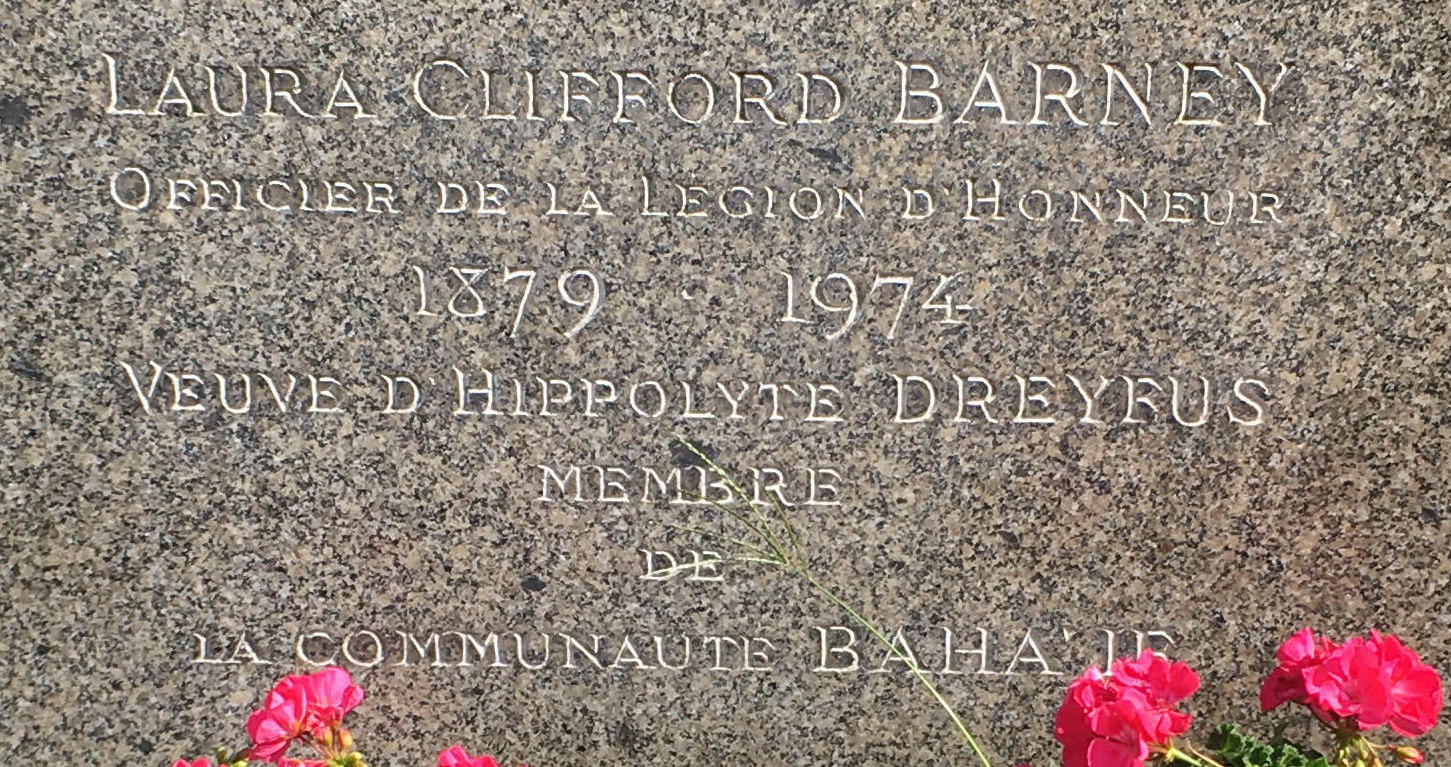
Tomb of Laura Clifford Barney, Passy Cemetery, Paris

She attended Les Ruches, a French boarding school founded by feminist Marie Souvestre. While continuing her studies in Paris, Laura met May Bolles (later Maxwell), a Canadian Baháʼí, and was converted to the faith in about 1900. Her mother converted soon afterward. In 1911, she married Hippolyte Dreyfus (married name Hippolyte Dreyfus-Barney).

Laura Barney financed the visit of the Persian Baháʼí scholar Mírzá Abu'l-Faḍl to the United States from 1901 to 1904, in order to propagate the religion there, and helped to publish the translation of his Ḥojaj al-bahīya.

In 1904 she visited ʻAbdu'l-Bahá in ʿAkkāʾ, Palestine, where she remained for about two years, acquiring a working knowledge of Persian and becoming a functioning member of his household. During that time she arranged to have ʻAbdu'l-Bahá's answers to her questions, mainly on philosophy and Christian theology, recorded by his secretaries. She collaborated with her future husband, Hippolyte Dreyfus, on the editing and translation of this work, and translated by Dreyfus as Les leçons de Saint Jean d'Acre, in French in 1909. In 1905-06 she visited Persia, the Caucasus, and Russia with Dreyfus. After their marriage in April 1911, when they both adopted the surname Dreyfus-Barney, she traveled extensively with him.

Both Laura and Hippolyte Dreyfus-Barney played a vital role in ʻAbdu'l-Bahá's successful visits to the West. Their intimate and personal relationship with him is unquestioned, even though Hippolyte accompanied ʻAbdu'l-Bahá more so than Laura and translated many of his speeches to French. Nonetheless, Laura's role is unique in the special bond she developed through her travels to Akka during her youth and later hosting ʻAbdu'l-Bahá in Paris. Her proficiency in the Persian language is another aspect that was unique at the time for a non-Persian woman. ʻAbdu'l-Bahá's first visit to Paris in September 1911 was hosted by Laura and her husband. They also traveled to London and acted as his interpreters. They were his "confidantes." ʻAbdu'l-Bahá's next visit to the west and the US took place in 1912. Laura was present again in New York. New Jersey and Washington, DC. Upon his return to London, both Laura and Hippolyte were present. Their last visit to Akka to visit ʻAbdu'l-Bahá was in 1921, the same year that he died.

Dreyfus-Barney was active in the International Council of Women from the 1920s to the 1960s and was its representative to the League of Nations and then later worked connecting the United Nations Children's Fund with various NGOs after World War II. Between these, during World War I, Dreyfus-Barney served in the American Ambulance Corps (1914–1915), and the American Red Cross (1916–1918) in France, and helped to establish the first children's hospital in Avignon (1918). For her lifetime of services she was named chevalier (1925) and officer (1937) of the French Légion d'Honneur. There is a copy of her unpublished memoirs in the Baháʼí national archives in France.

== Bibliography ==
- Baháʼí International Community, United Nations Office, Report to the United Nations and Public Information Policy Committee, New York, 21 July 1988 (on celebration of the centennial of the International Council of Women in honor of the memory of Laura Dreyfus-Barney).
- A. Fāżel Māzandarānī, Ẓohūr al-ḥaqq VIII/2, Tehran, 132 B.E./1975. U. R. Giachery, "Laura Clifford Dreyfus-Barney, 1879-1974" in The Baháʼí World 16, 1978, pp. 535–38.
- R. Meḥrāb-Ḵānī, Zendagī-e Mīrzā Abu'l-Fażl Golpāyagānī, Langenhain, Germany, 1988, p. 277. Who Was Who in America, 1897-1942 I, Chicago, 1968, p. 59.
