= Prix Renée Vivien =

The Prix Renée Vivien is an annual French literary prize which is awarded to poets who write in French. Dedicated to the British poet Renée Vivien, the eponymous prize was first initiated in 1935, and continued intermittently by three different patrons, each with their own vision. First patron was Hélène de Zuylen de Nyevelt de Haar, followed by Natalie Clifford Barney in 1949 then more latterly and currently ongoing from 1994 with Claude Evrard. From each patron, the naming of the award after Renée Vivien was an act of remembrance. Nonetheless, women's poetry, feminist literature and the memories of romantic entanglement with the honoured poet have been inspiring on the first two patrons, who were more alike in their approach to awarding poets, while the heritage of Renée Vivien's style in contemporary poetry interested more Claude Evrard.

== History ==
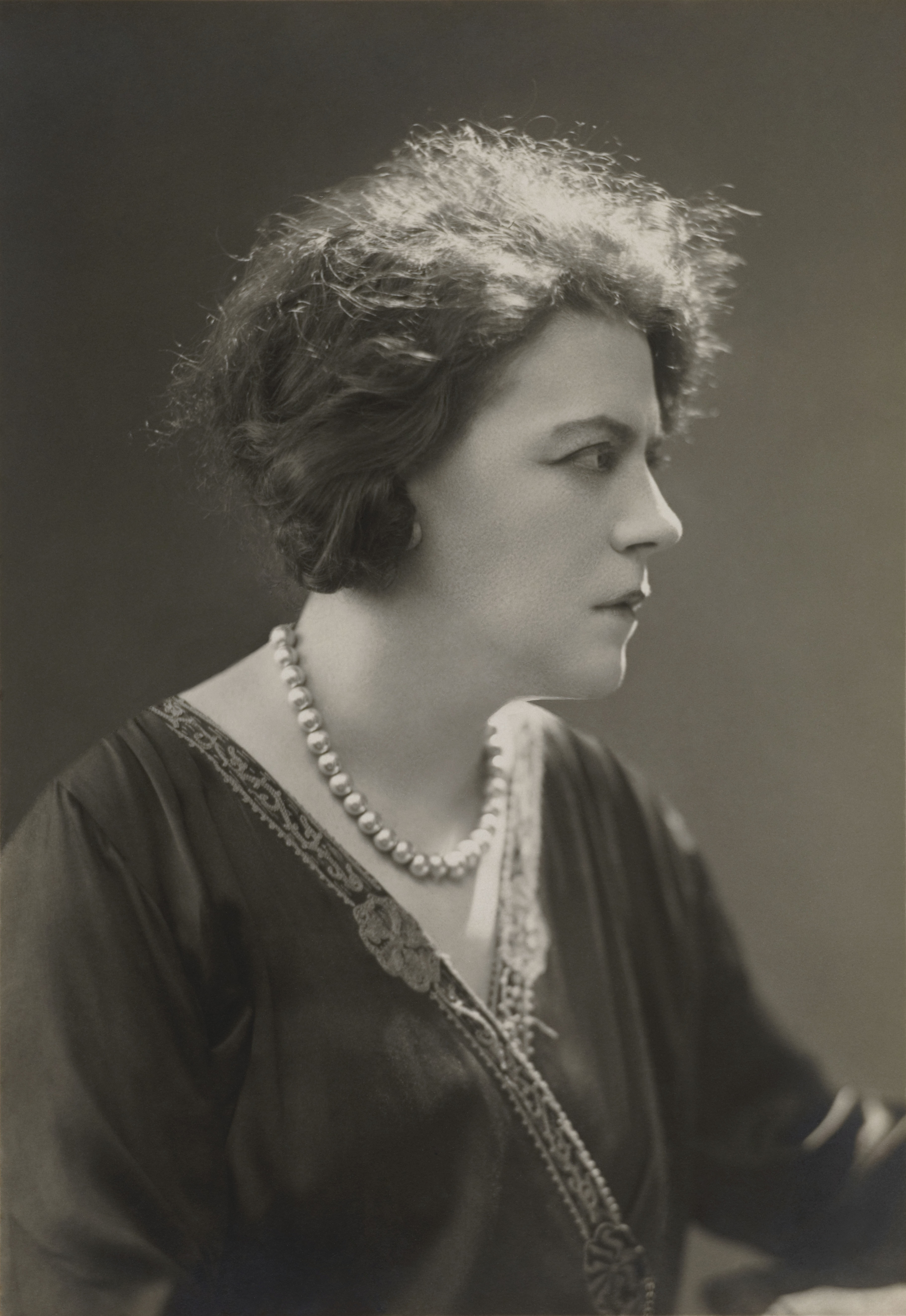
Lucie Delarue-Mardrus, the first winner of the prize in its original run

The initial prize was an annual French literary prize awarded in honour of the poet Renée Vivien, intended to give encouragement to aspiring French language women poets, along with a pecuniary endowment. This award was founded on July 23, 1935, at the initiative of Baroness Hélène de Zuylen de Nyevelt de Haar, one of Renée Vivien's renowned lovers, with whom she had written and published poetry under a single pen name: Paule Riversdale. From the outset, the Société des gens de lettres (Note: French Society of Men of Letters) assumed responsibility for awarding the prize. First awarded in 1936, the recent poetry prize was discontinued in 1939 after three award ceremonies, under imprecise circumstances as the Nazi regime took over in Europe.

In 1949, two years after the death of Hélène de Zuylen de Nyevelt de Haar, the discontinued prize was restored with a financial grant and maintained for several years under the authority of the Société des gens de lettres by Natalie Clifford Barney who took on the chairmanship of the jury in 1950. The revived poetry prize continued to be awarded, without any consideration to the nationality of its contestants, to women who had published one or more volumes of French verse and allowed Natalie Clifford Barney to memorialise the life and works of Renée Vivien. After more than a decade of awarding poetry and providing monetary grants for women poets, the Prix Renée Vivien (Note: Renée Vivien Prize) of the Société des gens de lettres was discontinued in 1962.

On the whole, the award's sponsorship profile and aims from Barney's time are much similar to those from Zuylen's time. Both of these times are also characterised by an organisation held by the single Société des gens de lettres and prizes awarded only to female authors.

After a long slack period, a French non-profit association located in Rivery and called Académie Renée Vivien (Note: Renée Vivien Academy) renewed the Renée Vivien Prize in 1994, under the presidency of Claude Evrard. (Note: Born on August 24, 1927, Claude Evrard, nicknamed Coupic, died on May 18, 2011, at Amiens, Picardy, France. He was a French author and poet. In 1994 he founded, together with Marie Vermunt, the Académie Renée Vivien, of which he was president.) This award honours distinguished works of French poetry which serve Renée Vivien's enlightened Hellenism, regardless of the gender or the nationality of the author. Despite a quite restricted visibility within the literary landscape, the awards continued until this day.

== List of laureates ==
There are three periods beginning, respectively, in 1935, 1949 (Note: It seems the 1956 Renée Vivien Prize was not awarded.) and 1994 (Note: Prizes were not awarded in some years: 2005, 2008, 2012, 2013, 2016 and 2017.). It is possible to distinguish two organising bodies within the three periods aforementioned: the former held by the Société des gens de lettres and the latter and current by the Académie Renée Vivien. This is a list of recipients of the Renée Vivien Prize according to these two organising bodies.

=== Société des gens de lettres ===
- 1936: Lucie Delarue-Mardrus – Mort et Printemps.
- 1937: Luce Laurand – Suite en mineur, La Clairière de Daphné and L'Herbe au vent.
- 1938: Claude Dervenn – L'Horizon, Equinoxes and Puissance des ailes.
- 1949: Louise de Vilmorin – L'Alphabet des aveux.
- 1950: Yanette Delétang-Tardif – Sept chants royaux.
- 1951: Germaine Beaumont – Disques. (Note: Disques was the poetry column of the French literary magazine Les Nouvelles littéraires)
- 1952: Lucienne Desnoues – Le Jardin délivré. (Note: Although Natalie Clifford Barney quoted Desnoues's collected poetry work Le Jardin délivré for the 1952 award in her memoires, academic works of reference specialising in poetry specified Les Racines, also assigning the Fénéon Prize for Le Jardin délivré in 1947. As the Fénéon Prize was established in March 1948 and its first award given to Michel Cournot for Martinique in 1949, there is no possibility for having awarded it before. Therefore, Barney's version has been retained.)
- 1953: Anne-Marie Kegels – Rien que vivre.
- 1954: Andrée Sodenkamp – Sainte Terre.
- 1955: Liliane Wouters – La Marche Forcée.
- 1957: Marthe-Claire Fleury – Gris Trianon.
- 1958: Marguerite Yourcenar – Les Charités d'Alcippe.
- 1959: Anne-Marie de Backer – L'Herbe et le Feu.
- 1960: Jacqueline de Bie – Les Vergers du songe.
- 1961: Magdeleine Labour – Sabliers.

=== Académie Renée Vivien ===
- 1994: Gilbert Foret – Femmes, femmes, femmes, mes heures au féminin.
- 1995: Jacques-François Dussottier – Ô femmes.
- 1996: Claire Hercelin – Comme une allégorie.
- 1997: Vital Heurtebize – Le Temps ultime.
- 1998: Guy Vieilfault – Èves.
- 1999: Pascale Badré – Ombre à la bougie.
- 2000: Françoise Tchartiloglou – Pour t'aimer.
- 2001: Gabrielle Clerc – Devalyana ou Les Aigles planent sur les mers.
- 2002: Patricia Coulanges – Féminae.
- 2003: Elena Constantinescu – Stefka ou les premières roses.
- 2004: Jean Gallé – Évanescences.
- 2006: Philippe Courtel – Les Yeux en amande.
- 2007: Daniel Chétif – Diva.
- 2009: Véronique Flabat-Piot – Dites-le avec le cœur.
- 2010: Catherine Grange-Roussel – La femme du silence.
- 2011: Güliz Mutlu – Les Paroles Saphiques.
- 2014: Catherine Berenguer-Joly – Femmes, femmes, atout cœur.
- 2015: Nicolas Saeys – Un bohème affairé dort.
- 2018: Lucien Van Meer – Les Effrontées.
- 2019: Jean-Noël Cuénod – Qui a éteint le feu ?.
- 2020: Stéphane Amiot – Saisons de lagunage.
- 2021: Eva Marzi – Nuit scribe.
- 2022: Armelle Barguillet-Hauteloire – Dans le murmure du songe
