= Domaine de Baronarques =

Domaine de Baronarques is a vineyard and winery located in Saint-Polycarpe, in the Aude department of the Languedoc-Roussillon region. It is part of the AOC Limoux. It was purchased by Baroness Philippine de Rothschild and her two sons, Philippe Sereys de Rothschild and Julien de Beaumarchais de Rothschild in December 1998 and has been extensively renovated on a five-year project. Producing their first vintage in 2003.

== History ==
Domaine de Baronarques was originally the property of the Abbey of St. Polycarpe, dating back at least to the 17th century when it was called Domaine de Lambert. After the French Revolution, it changed hands several times under the name of Domaine de Lambert, eventually belonging to Mr. Michel Tisseyre. At this point it was both a farm and a small vineyard. He began to grow more vines until he passed it on to his son, Guyonnet.

Guyonnet Tisseyre was responsible for building the château on the property, from 1890 to 1900, engraving both initials on the facade of the new chateau. The emblem of the estate is theatrical mask depicting a human face, the original purpose of which was to ward off evil spirits. Located on the facade of the house and marking a real link with the Rothschild family's passion for the theatre.

In 1998, Mr. Chéreau, a Marseille lawyer and heir of the estate sold it to Baroness Philippine de Rothschild and her two sons. The three entrusts the management of the Domaine to the family company, Baron Philippe de Rothschild S.A. The estate was very run down, calling for extensive renovation of the vineyard and the winemaking facilities, a process that took five years.

In 2015, Domaine de Baron'arques is renamed Domaine de Baronarques. The three wine names of the property were also slightly changed : from the 2013 vintage Domaine de Baron'arques became Domaine de Baronarques and La Capitelle du Domaine de Baron'arques became La Capitelle de Baronarques. Since the 2014 vintage, le Chardonnay de Baron'arques is Domaine de Baronarques - White wine. The Domaine is now a single 110 hectares (270 acres) estate, 43 hectares (110 acres) of which are planted in vines.

== Terroir ==
There are six grape varietals planted at the Domaine; three Bordeaux varieties which represents 70% of the vineyard (Merlot, Cabernet Sauvignon, Cabernet Franc), and three Mediterranean varieties (Syrah, Grenache and Malbec). The team at the Domaine has created a chardonnay for the white wine.

There are four separate climates that influence the vineyards at the Domaine. There is the terroir d'Autan, providing a warm and dry climate, the Mediterranean terroir, providing a warm and humid climate, the oceanic climate coming from the Atlantic and the terroir Haute Vallée a combination of the three previous terroirs.

The soil at the Domaine is mostly chalky clay, with portions of gravelly, sandy soil on other parcels. The elevation of the Domaine is between 250 and 350 meters above sea level.

The Domaine hand-picks its grapes in 12 kilogram boxes to keep them whole throughout the process, just as they do at Chateau Mouton Rothschild, Opus One and Almaviva (the first one belonging entirely to the Rothschild Family and the two latters are joint ventures). Domaine has 27 stainless steel vats end eight concrete vats in its vat room, allowing for separate vinification of all of the varietals and the different parcels.

== Wines ==
Domaine de Baronarques produces three different wines : Domaine de Baronarques - Grand vin rouge, La Capitelle de Baronarques and Domaine de Baronarques - Grand vin blanc. The earliest vintage of the signature wine is 2003 and has been produced every year since then. La Capitelle was added in 2008 and Le Chardonnay in 2009. The AOC Limoux requires that the wine be composed of at least 50 percent Merlot.
