= Pauline de Rothschild =

French socialite (1908–1976)

Pauline, Baroness de Rothschild (née Potter; December 31, 1908 – March 8, 1976) was an American fashion designer, writer and, with her second husband, a translator of both Elizabethan poetry and the plays of Christopher Fry. She was named, with Diana Vreeland, who was added to this list in 1964, to the International Best Dressed List Hall of Fame in 1969, alongside Douglas Fairbanks, Jr., Dean Acheson, Angier Biddle Duke, Cary Grant, and Prince Philip, Duke of Edinburgh.

== Early life ==
She was born Pauline Potter at 10 rue Octave Feuillet in the Paris neighborhood of Passy, to wealthy expatriate American parents of Protestant background. Her mother was Gwendolen Cary, a great-grand-niece of Thomas Jefferson and a distant cousin of Britain's Lords Falkland and Cary. Her father was Francis Hunter Potter, a playboy who was a grandson of Alonzo Potter, an Episcopal Bishop of Pennsylvania, and a nephew and great-nephew of successive Episcopal bishops of New York, Horatio Potter and Henry Codman Potter.

Potter was a member of several families that were prominent in the American South since the 17th century. She was a great-great-granddaughter of Francis Scott Key and a direct descendant of Pocahontas. His wife Mary Tayloe Lloyd Key was both a Lloyd, daughter of Edward Lloyd IV of Wye House and a Tayloe of Mount Airy on her mother, Elizabeth's side, the daughter of John Tayloe II and sister to John Tayloe III of The Octagon House, arguably the wealthiest American, if not Southern planter. Her grand-aunts Jennie and Hetty Cary (wife of the Confederate general John Pegram) were well-known figures during the Civil War, known as the "Cary Invincibles" and considered heroines for sewing battle flags. It was Jennie Cary who put the words of James Ryder Randall's poem "Maryland, My Maryland" to the German folk song "Lauriger Horatius", thereby creating what would become the state song of Maryland. Her mother's cousin and sometime guardian Constance Cary Harrison was one of the United States' best-known women in the late 19th century, a prominent novelist and social reformer. Another cousin, Francis Burton Harrison, served as Governor General of the Philippines and was a Democratic candidate for the U.S. presidency.

Due to her parents' frequent separations and subsequent divorce and their later marital and romantic entanglements and custody disputes, she was brought up in varying degrees of poverty and luxury in New York City, Paris, Biarritz, and Baltimore. She was educated at a private finishing school in Groslay, a town north of Paris, as well as schools and tutors elsewhere in France and Maryland, but her formal education was effectively over by the age of 16.

By her father's second marriage to Clara Waterman Knight Colford (formerly Mrs. Sidney Jones Colford), a Philadelphia sugar and utilities heiress, she had two stepsisters, Clara and Dorothy.

== First marriage ==
In 1930, in Baltimore, Maryland, she married Charles Carroll Fulton Leser (1900–1949), a descendant of Charles Carroll of Carrollton, an art restorer, who was the younger son of a prominent judge and a grandson of Felix Agnus one of the city's leading newspaper publishers. He also was an alcoholic and a homosexual. After moving to Mallorca, Spain soon after their marriage, they separated in 1934, divorced in 1939, and had no children.

== Romances ==
After she and Leser separated, she was romantically involved with a number of prominent men, including Paul-Henri Spaak (a Prime Minister of Belgium), American diplomat Elim O'Shaughnessy (1907-1966), French horticultural heir André Levesque de Vilmorin (1907-1987), Grand Duke Dmitri Pavlovitch Romanov of Russia (one of the assassins of Rasputin), and producer-director Jed Harris. For a period of years she also was the lover of Isabelle Kemp, an heiress to a New York drug-store and real-estate fortune.

== Career ==
In the early 1930s, she worked as a personal shopper in New York City, acting as a fashion advisor to wealthy socialites too busy to shop and too unsure of their personal style. Later, after moving to Europe with her first husband, she operated dress shops on Mallorca. She also worked for the couturier Elsa Schiaparelli in London and Paris and often was seen in society columns dressed in the firm's latest creations.

In the early 1940s, she and a friend, Louise Macy, a former editor of Harper's Bazaar, opened Macy-Potter, a short-lived fashion house, in New York City. The firm was bankrolled by a monetary settlement from Macy's former lover, millionaire John Hay Whitney, a.k.a. Jock Whitney, who had left her to marry Betsey Cushing, a former daughter-in-law of President Franklin Delano Roosevelt. Though Macy-Potter's first (and only) collection was a critical and financial disaster, Potter went on to design a collection for Marshall Field and later to direct the custom-fashion division of Hattie Carnegie, the New York fashion company, succeeding Jean Louis, who left in 1943 to become chief fashion designer for Columbia Pictures.

She remained at Hattie Carnegie for nearly a decade and was known professionally as Mrs. Fairfax Potter. Philippe de Rothschild and Joan Littlewood, Milady Vine: The Autobiography of Philippe de Rothschild (London: Jonathan Cape, 1984) Among her clients were the Duchess of Windsor, automotive heiress Thelma Chrysler Foy, actress Gertrude Lawrence, actress Ina Claire, and prominent others. She also designed the women's costumes for John Huston's Broadway 1946 production of No Exit by Jean-Paul Sartre, starring Ruth Ford and Annabella. The gown she designed for Ford is in the collection of the Museum of the City of New York.

Potter also worked briefly as an uncredited fashion model. One assignment for Harper's Bazaar had her posing in the latest Grecian-style gowns for the photographer Louise Dahl-Wolfe.

== Second marriage ==
On 8 April 1954, she became the second wife of Baron Philippe de Rothschild, a polymath and poet who was the owner of the fabled French winery Château Mouton Rothschild. The baron's previous wife, Elisabeth Pelletier de Chambure, died in 1945 in Ravensbrück concentration camp.

By this marriage, she had one stepchild, Philippine de Rothschild (1933–2014).

== Literary pursuits ==
De Rothschild admired the works of the Japanese novelist Yukio Mishima and the stories of Danish writer Isak Dinesen, and she hoped to make her mark as a writer. Her articles about fashion, travel, and other subjects were published in Harper's Bazaar and Vogue (the latter's editor in chief, Diana Vreeland, was a distant cousin). In 1966, Harcourt Brace published her only book, The Irrational Journey, a brief, atmospheric memoir of a trip she and her husband took to the Soviet Union in the dead of winter.

== Death ==
De Rothschild died on 8 March 1976, of a heart attack in the lobby of the Biltmore Hotel, in Santa Barbara, California. She previously had been diagnosed with breast cancer and had undergone open-heart surgery for a deteriorated valve in 1975. Rothschild's health problems were exacerbated by Marfan's syndrome, a genetic abnormality.

== Burial ==
She is buried on the grounds of Château Mouton Rothschild in Pauillac, Bordeaux, France, beneath a translucent tomb made of Lalique glass and marble. The monument also contains the remains of her second husband and his parents, Mathilde and Henri de Rothschild.

== Ancestors ==
Ancestors of Pauline de Rothschild

8. Alonzo Potter
4. Francis Hunter Potter
9. Sarah Benedict
2. Francis Hunter Potter
10. Philip Barton Key
5. Alice Lloyd Key
11. Ellen Swan
1. Pauline Potter
12. Wilson Miles Cary
6. Sydney Carr Cary
13. Jane Margaret Carr
3. Gwendolen Playford Cary
14. William H. Playford
7. Pauline Playford
15. Ellen Cassandra Krepps
