= Henri de Rothschild =

French playwright

Henri James de Rothschild
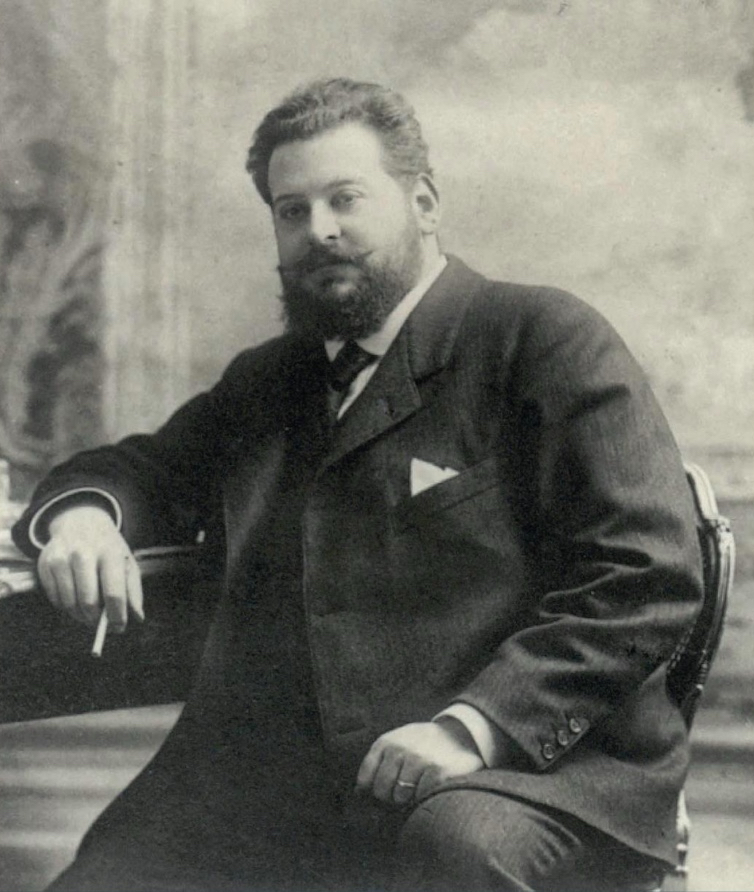
- Born: 26 July 1872; Paris, France
- Died: 12 October 1947 (aged 75); Jouxtens-Mézery, Vaud, Switzerland
- Education: Lycée Louis-le-Grand
- Spouse: Mathilde Weisweiller (m. 1895; died 1926)
- Children: James-Henri de Rothschild; Nadine de Rothschild; Philippe de Rothschild
- Parent(s): James Edouard de Rothschild and Thérèse von Rothschild
- Relatives: See: Rothschild family

Henri James Nathaniel Charles, Baron de Rothschild (26 July 1872 – 12 October 1947) was a French playwright who wrote under the pen names André Pascal, Charles des Fontaines, and P.-L. Naveau. He was also a licensed physician (although he never actually practiced medicine), a philanthropist, and an entrepreneur.

== Early life ==
Rothschild was born on 26 July 1872 in Paris, although he was a scion of the English branch of the Rothschild family. He was the son of James Edouard de Rothschild (1844–1881) and Thérèse von Rothschild (1847–1931). His paternal grandfather was Nathaniel de Rothschild, originally from London, the founder of the French wine-making branch of the Rothschild family. Although he lived primarily in France, he was "prominent in British society and was a member of the Royal Yacht Squadron at Cowes."

After attending the Lycée Louis-le-Grand in Paris, he interned in the maternity ward of the municipal Hôpital de la Charité working under "some of the most famous physicians and surgeons in France." He earned his Doctor of Medicine degree, with highest honors, in 1898.

== Career ==
A noted playwright, he wrote under the pen names, including Charles des Fontaines. His greatest success as a playwright was a play entitled Croesus, which premiered in Paris. The play is essentially about "a rich man who meets with disillusion everywhere." When he was unable to get it staged through a manager, "he produced it at a theatre which he built at his own expense in Paris; and then it made so great a hit there that it had long runs first on the banks of the Seine and then in London, after being cleverly translated into English."

He served as editor of the Revue d'Hygiène et de Pathologie de Infantile, which was published in Paris, as well as a number of scientific works, particularly focused on children's gastrointestinal issues. He published three volumes, each 800 pages, on mixed and artificial lactation, entitled Bibliographia Lactaria

Upon the German invasion of France in 1940, Rothschild fled to Brazil. Under the 1942 antisemitic laws of Vichy France, Rothschild's extensive real estate and art holdings were confiscated and his French citizenship was revoked. "An early act of the new French Government" in November 1944, "was to restore to him both his property and his citizenship." He returned to Europe, spent some time in Portugal, before returning to his home at Castel Beau Cèdre in April 1946, where he lived until his death in 1947.

=== Philanthropy ===
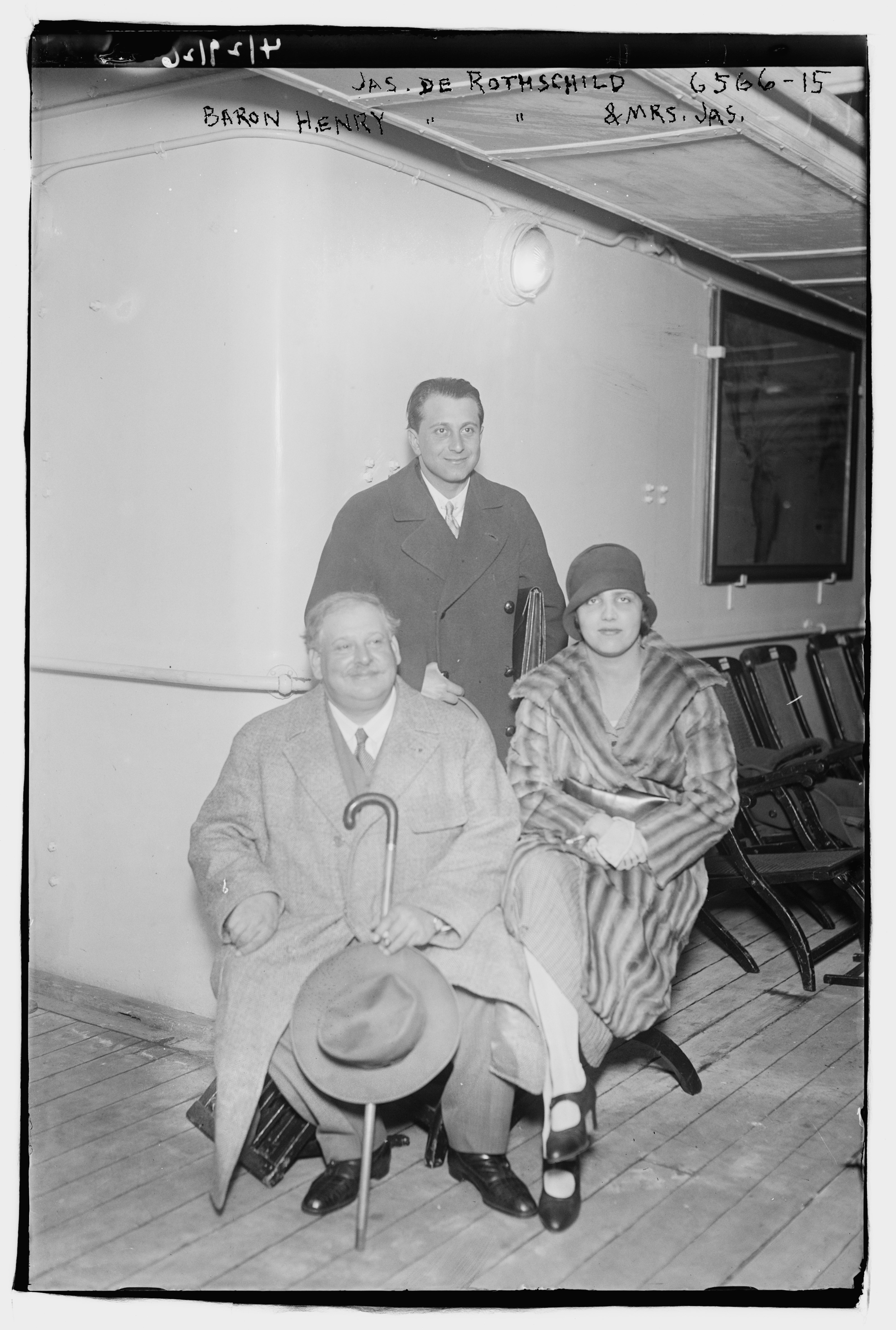
Baron de Rothschild, his eldest son, James, and daughter-in-law, Claude.

Rothschild, and his wife, founded and financed many hospitals and asylums for "crippled and ailing children" around France. In Paris he set up a large private hospital, known as the Rothschild Hospital, of which he was head physician. He was awarded the Cross of the Legion of Honor for "his philanthropic work" and was later elevated to Officer of the same Order for "his invaluable services during the great war".

== Personal life ==
In 1895, he married Mathilde Sophie Henriette von Weissweiller (1872–1926) at the Grand Synagogue of Paris in the Rue de la Victoire. Together, they had three children:

- James-Henri de Rothschild (1896–1984), who married Claude Dupont, a daughter of Capt. Dupont in 1923. After her death in 1964, he married Yvette Choquet in 1966.
- Nadine de Rothschild (1898–1958), who married Adrien Thierry, then counselor of the French Embassy at London who was a son of Joseph Thierry, the French Minister of Public Works and Minister of Finance, in 1919.
- Philippe de Rothschild (1902–1988), who married Élisabeth Pelletier de Chambure in 1935. After her death in the Ravensbruck concentration camp in 1945, he married Pauline Fairfax Potter in 1954.

In 1926, he came to the United States aboard the Paris for a prolonged tour.

The Baroness de Rothschild, a noted philanthropist, died in 1926. Baron de Rothschild died on 12 October 1947 at his estate, Castel Beau Cèdre in Jouxtens-Mézery, Vaud, Switzerland.

== Residences ==
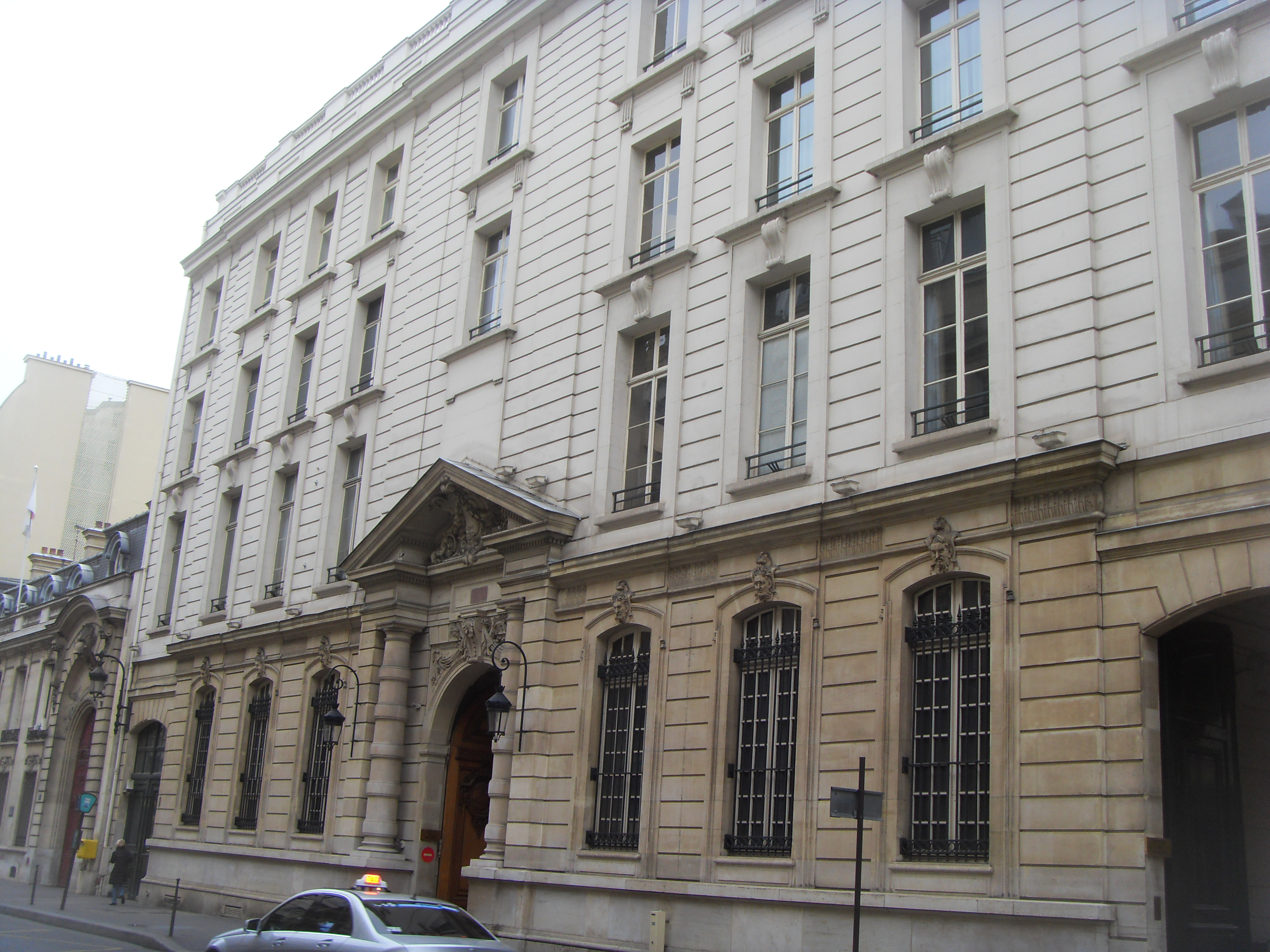
The Hôtel Perrinet de Jars, 2008

=== Hôtel Perrinet de Jars ===
During World War I, he turned over Hôtel Perrinet de Jars (also known as the Hôtel Henri de Rothschild), his hôtel particulier on the Rue du Faubourg Saint-Honoré in Paris, to the French government for its use during the conflict as a club for officers of the Allied armies. The hôtel had been acquired by his grandfather, Nathaniel de Rothschild, in 1856 for FF 1,675,000 from Marie-Rose, Duchess Decrès. At the hotel, Rothschild hung a pastel by de La Tour, which he bought for $120,000 at the Jacques Doucet sale in 1912. In 1920, after the war ended, he sold the hôtel to the Cercle de l'Union interalliée (for the equivalent of today's €1,067,143).

=== Château de la Muette ===
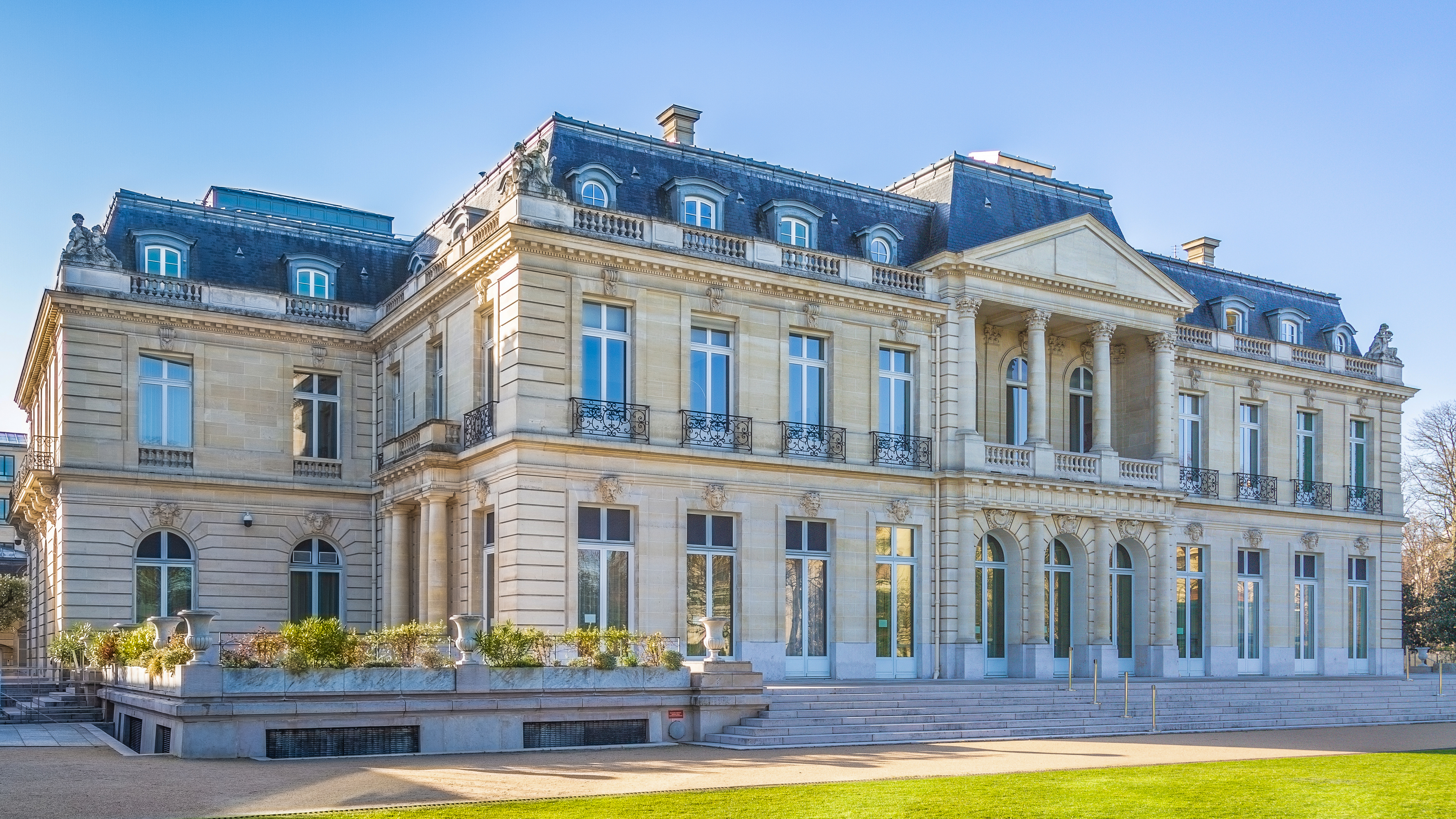
Château de la Muette in 2019

Towards the end of the war, Rothschild acquired two large lots in Paris that contained the Château de la Muette. The old château was demolished in the 1920s and Rothschild had a new château built there between 1921 and 1922 as his Paris residence to a 19th-century design by Lucien Hesse.

The château was appropriated by Nazi Germany's Kriegsmarine during World War II. During the Liberation of Paris in August 1944, the château was captured after a brief gunfight by the British '30 Assault Unit' keen on gathering vital intelligence. In late 1945 United States Army took over the buildings to organise operations in the aftermath of the war. After Rothschild's death in 1947, his heirs sold it to the Organization for European Economic Co-operation in 1949 for use as their headquarters. The OEEC developed into the Organisation for Economic Co-operation and Development in 1961 and the château remains their headquarters.

The "Rue André Pascal" street on which the cour d'honneur of the château opens is named after one of the pseudonyms under which Henri de Rothschild published his literary works.

=== Abbaye des Vaux de Cernay ===
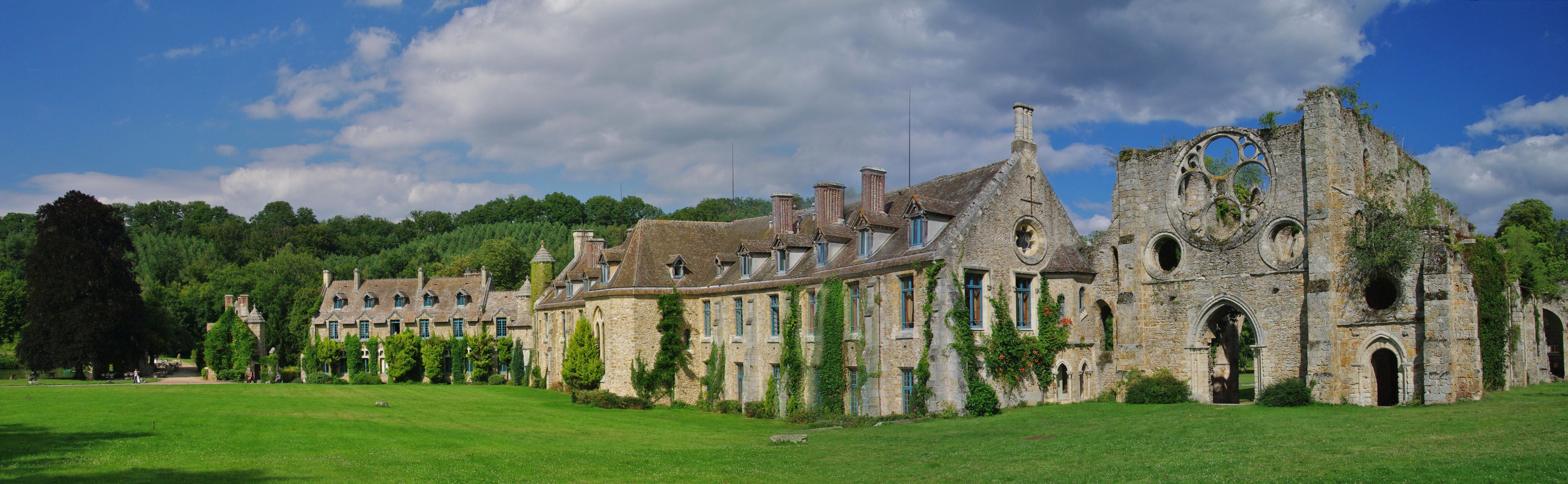
The Abbaye des Vaux de Cernay

In 1903, Rothschild inherited the Abbaye des Vaux de Cernay in Cernay-la-Ville in the Vallée de Chevreuse from his grandmother Charlotte. She had bought the Abbey in 1878, at the time only a ruins of a Cistercian abbey that had been built in 1118. She undertook extensive restoration work and new construction to make the lakeside property into a country home. Upon Henri inheriting the property, he further updated the residence and used it for his experiments in child nutrition.

In November 1942, Henri and his son James 1,800 acre property in Vaux de Cernay was expropriated under the antisemitic laws of Vichy France. The Abbey was sold at auction to the industrialist and aircraft manufacturer Félix Amiot, who moved his private offices there.

=== Château des Fontaines ===
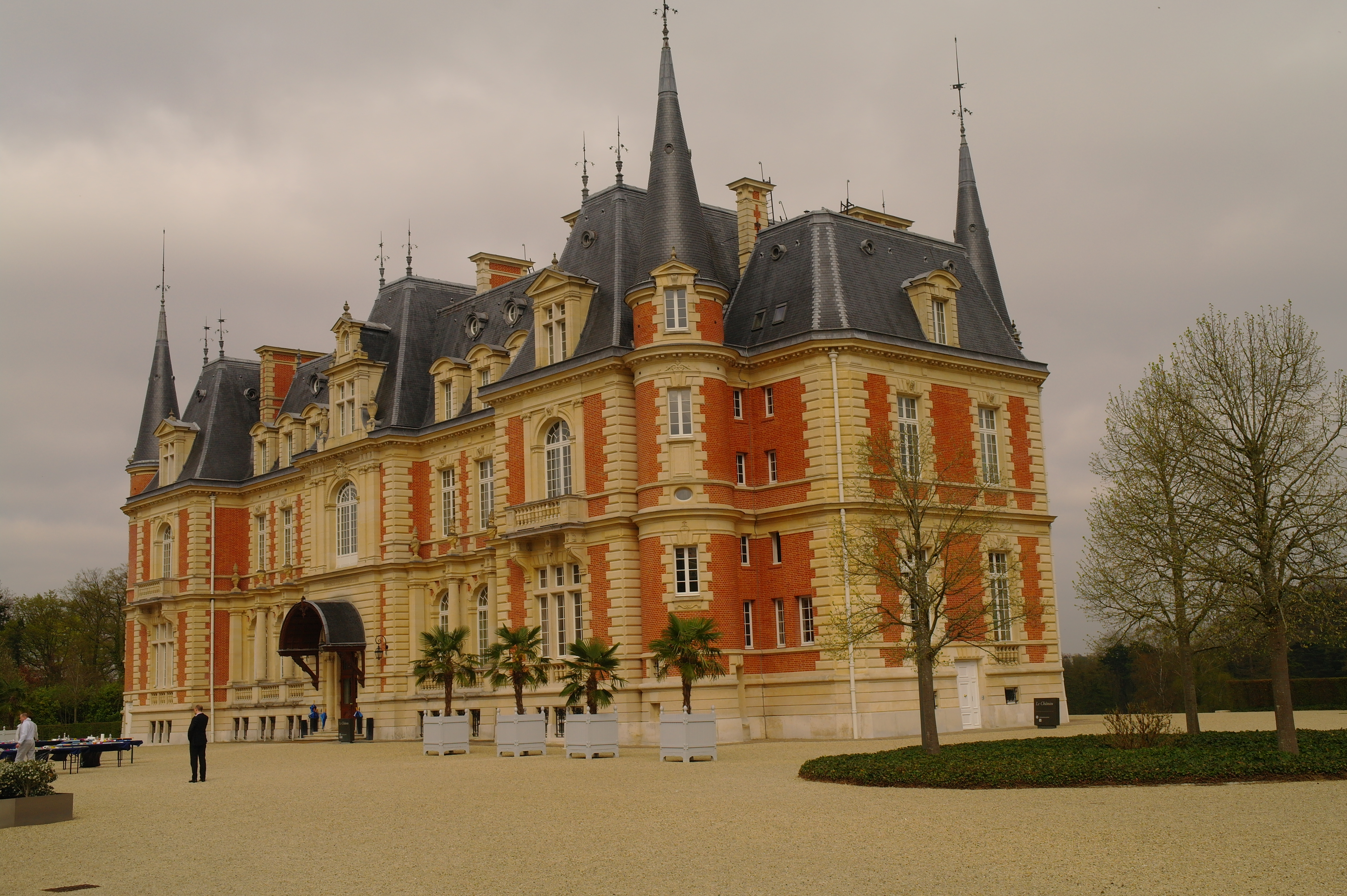
Château des Fontaines, 2011

Upon his 1895 marriage, his mother gifted him the Château des Fontaines in Gouvieux near Chantilly. Construction of the château was started by his father in 1879 by architect Félix Langlais according to his father's designs. Not completed at the time of his father's death in 1881, it was finished by his mother in 1882.

Although he was the owner of the château, Henri rarely visited and it remained his mother's summer residence until her death in 1931. Henri's son, Philippe, however, reportedly spent his summers at the château with his grandmother. It was also occupied by the Nazis during World War II, and was sold to the Jesuits in 1946 who set up a library and research center there. It was acquired by the consulting firm Capgemini in 1998 and remains owned by them to this day.

=== Castel Beau Cèdre ===
Rothschild also acquired Castel Beau Cèdre (also known as Castel Beau Cidri), an estate in Jouxtens-Mézery, Vaud, Switzerland. The château on the estate had been built in 1770 by Lausanne architect Gustave Wanner. Also on the estate was a working farm with buildings constructed between 1872 and 1891 by the agronomist Gustave Auberjonois. Rothschild furnished the house with furniture supplied to Princess Pauline Borghèse for her Paris residence at Hôtel Borghèse and later acquired by the Duke of Wellington as the British Embassy in Paris.
