= Misgav =

Misgav, Misgab (Hebrew: מִשְׂגָּב, lit. fortress) may refer to the following:

- Misgav Regional Council (Mo'atza Azorit Misgav), a regional council in Israel
- Misgav Am, a kibbutz in Israel
- Misgav Dov, a moshav near Gedera
- Misgav Ladach, a private, limited-service hospital in Jerusalem

Related words

- Segev (same word root)
