= Segev =

Segev (Hebrew: שֶׂגֶב, lit. greatness, exaltedness) may refer to the following people:

- Dorry Segev, Israeli-born American physician
- Dov Segev-Steinberg, Israeli diplomat
- Inbal Segev, Israeli cellist
- Itay Segev (born 1995), Israeli basketball player
- Mordechai Segev, Israeli physicist
- Moshe Segev, Israeli celebrity chef, restaurateur, television presenter
- Muli Segev (born 1972), Israeli TV editor, producer, director, screenwriter, actor and a journalist
- Gilad Segev (born 1974), Israeli singer-songwriter, musician, author, and travel documentarian
- Gonen Segev, former Israeli politician
- Tom Segev, Israeli historian
- Shay Segev, business executive
- Samuel Segev (1926–2012), Israeli journalist and author
- Yaniv Segev, Israeli footballer

== See also ==
- Atzmon, formerly known as Segev
- Misgav Regional Council, also known as Gush Segev
