= Philippe de Rothschild =

Wine grower and auto racer (1902–1988)

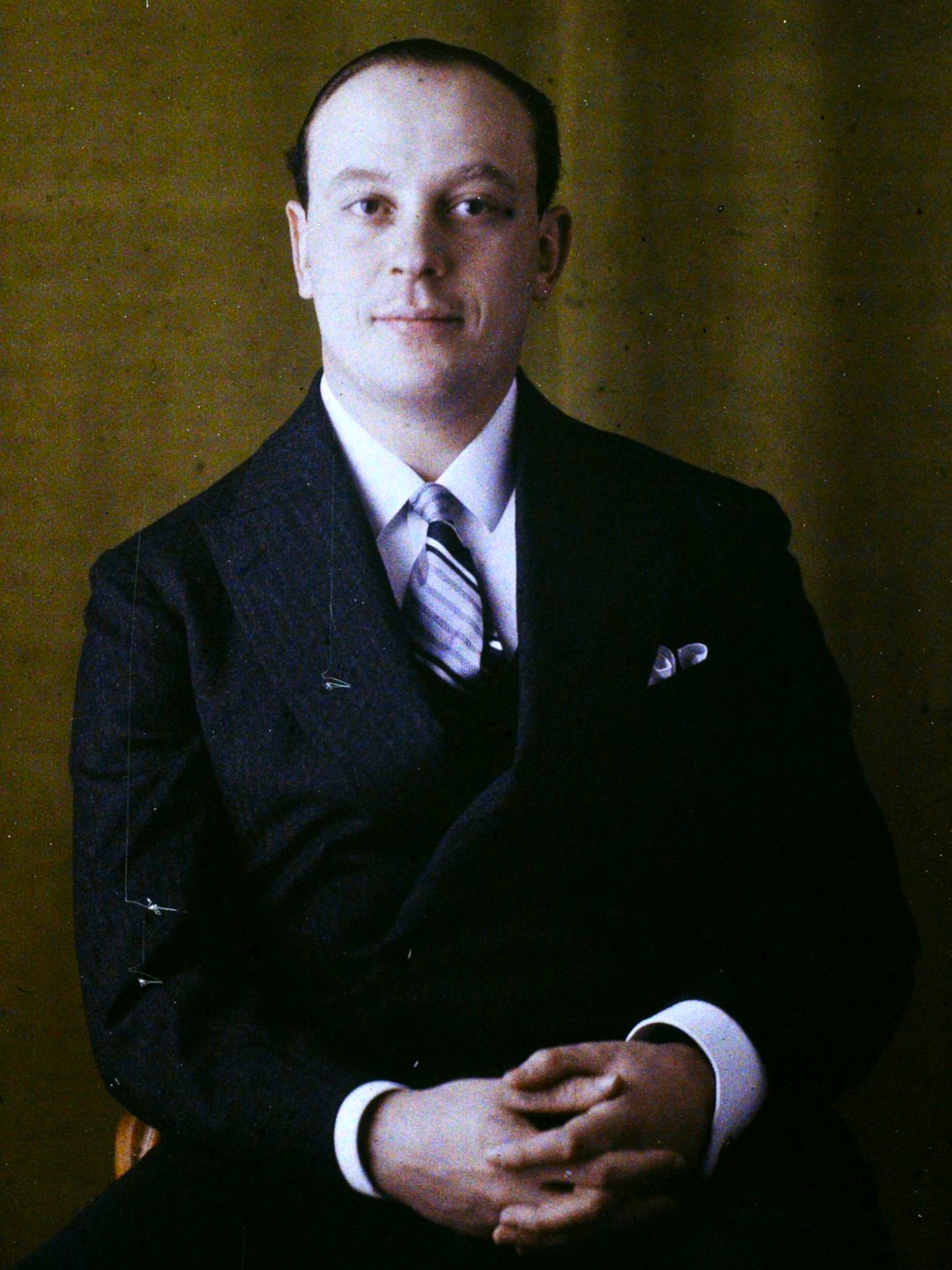
- 1931 Autochrome
- Born: Georges Philippe de Rothschild; 13 April 1902; Paris, France
- Died: 20 January 1988 (aged 85); Paris, France
- Spouses: Élisabeth Pelletier de Chambure (m. 1934; died 1945) Pauline Fairfax Potter (m. 1954; died 1976)
- Partner: Joan Littlewood
- Parent: Baron Henri de Rothschild
- Family: Rothschild

Philippe, Baron de Rothschild (13 April 1902 – 20 January 1988) was a member of the Rothschild banking family who became a Grand Prix motor racing driver, a screenwriter and playwright, a theatrical producer, a film producer, a poet, and a wine grower.

== Early life ==
Born in Paris, Georges Philippe de Rothschild was the younger son of Baron Henri de Rothschild and Mathilde Sophie Henriette von Weissweiller. At the outbreak of World War I, 12-year-old Philippe was sent to the family's vineyard in the village of Pauillac in the Médoc. There, he developed a love for the wine business, an enterprise in his family since 1853, but one his father and grandfather had shown little interest in.

== Car racing ==
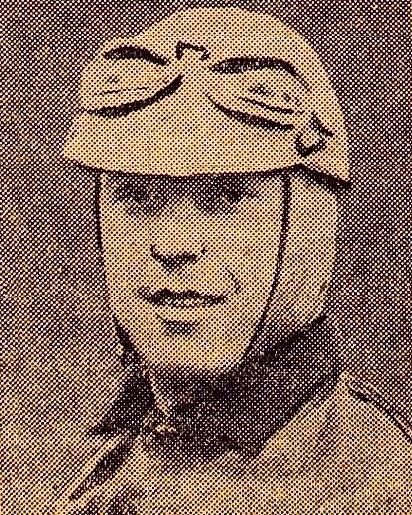
Rothschild at the 1929 24 Hours of Le Mans

During the 1920s, Philippe lived the life of a wealthy playboy, often found in the company of a beautiful woman, usually an actress, at one of the popular night spots in Paris. Philippe's older brother had made friends with Robert Benoist when they served together in the Armée de l'Air during World War I and through this connection, for a short time Philippe took up Grand Prix motor racing. From his father, he inherited the love of fast cars, but wishing to maintain a low profile Philippe used the pseudonym "Georges Philippe" in order to race anonymously.

Rothschild raced his own Bugatti T35C with moderate success, including coming fourth in the 1929 Monaco Grand Prix. He also made a brief appearance for the elite Bugatti works team, but at the end of 1929 he abruptly withdrew from motorsport, to concentrate on the family wine-growing business.

Rothschild made his first competition appearance in the Paris–Nice auto race of 1928, competing in a borrowed Hispano-Suiza. After purchasing a supercharged Bugatti, the ex Targa Florio factory type 37A (37317) T37, he adopted the pseudonym to protect his family. 'Georges Philippe' made his first appearance at the 1928 Bugatti Grand Prix at Le Mans, a race solely for private Bugatti owners where he became second immediately after the winner André Dubonnet.

For 1929, Rothschild decided to upgrade to a full Grand Prix-specification Type 35C. In fact, he was so enamoured with the vehicles, he ordered three. Using one of the new cars, Georges Philippe was entered into the Grand Prix d'Antibes. In a field that included René Dreyfus and Philippe Étancelin, both race winners many times over, Rothschild led the race until he crashed out on the 36th lap. A mere two weeks later, with the car rebuilt, Georges Philippe finished a highly creditable fourth at the inaugural Grand Prix Automobile de Monaco, behind winner William Grover-Williams.

Continued improvement was finally rewarded when Georges Philippe won the Burgundy Grand Prix three weeks later, finishing ahead of Guy Bouriat in a second Rothschild T35C. However, he was unfortunate to retire from the following race while running sixth. The third of Rothschild's T35Cs was regularly campaigned by a rather curious acquaintance for a future Baron. A model and exotic dancer at the Casino de Paris, Helene Delangle regularly took to the track under her professional pseudonym Hellé Nice.

Nevertheless, Georges Philippe had attracted sufficient attention to be offered a factory drive alongside Monegasque star Louis Chiron. In his two races for the crack squad, Rothschild ran at the front of the field, before dropping back later in the race due to vehicle troubles. At the 1929 German Grand Prix, around the notorious Nürburgring Nordschleife, Georges Philippe was comfortably ahead of Chiron before contact with a wall caused damage to his Bugatti's axle, slowing the car and allowing Chiron to pass and take the victory.

Unfortunately, increasing fame was wearing Georges Philippe's anonymity rather thin. His final appearance was in the 1930 24 Hours of Le Mans where, driving an American Stutz, he failed to finish. After this Rothschild quietly laid 'Georges Philippe' to rest, and returned to running Château Mouton Rothschild.

In 1935, Rothschild and his friend, Jean Rheims, who were sponsoring a bobsled team, refused to participate in the 1936 Winter Olympics at Garmisch-Partenkirchen, Germany, protesting what they called the "persecution of Germans of Jewish religion."

== Wine grower ==
Rothschild took over the operations of the Château Mouton Rothschild vineyards at twenty years old.

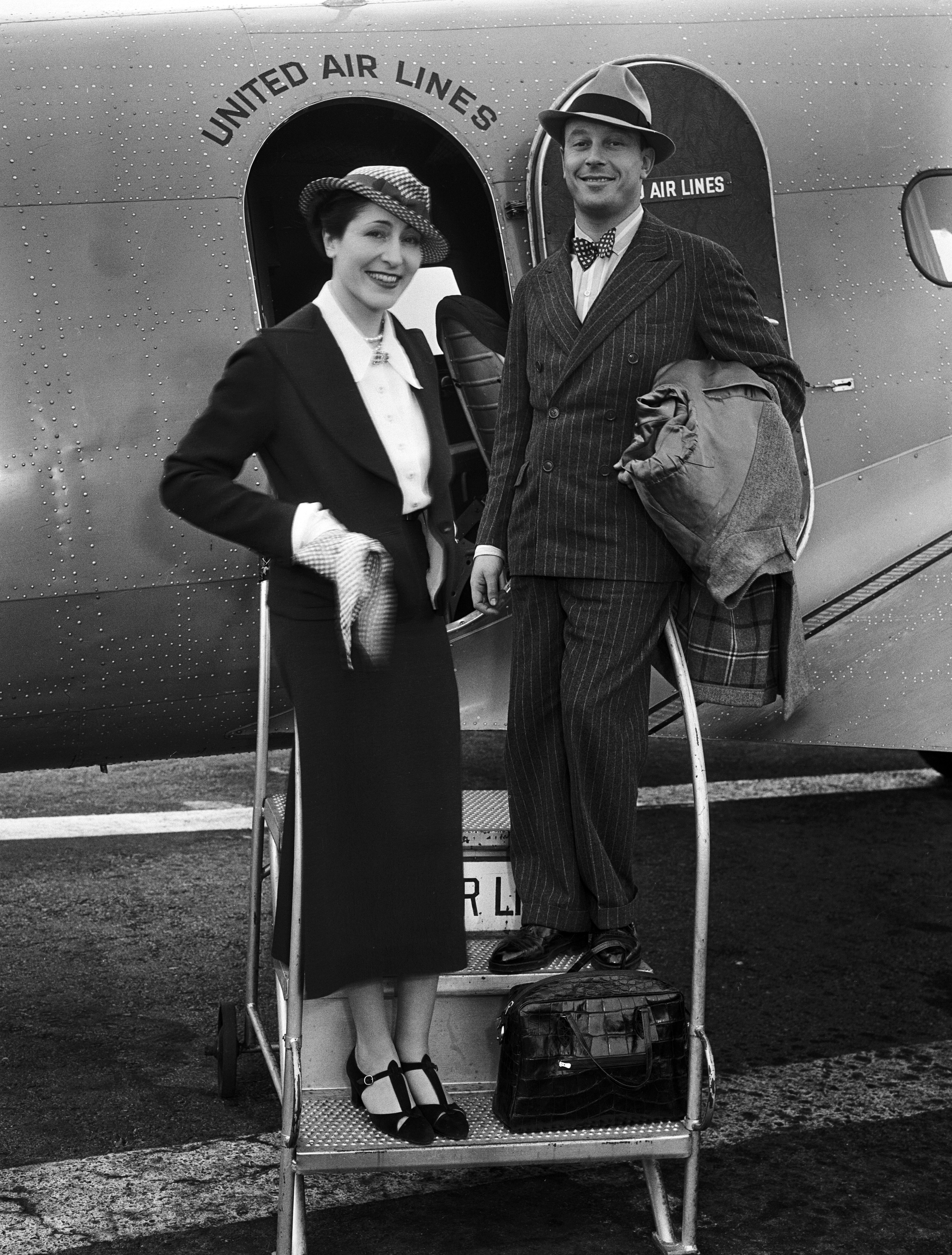
Baron Philippe de Rothschild with his wife Elisabeth de Rothschild shortly after their marriage, 1935.

== Personal life ==
In 1934, Philippe de Rothschild married Élisabeth Pelletier de Chambure (1902–1945), the former wife of Jonkheer Marc de Becker-Rémy, a Belgian nobleman. They had two children: Philippine Mathilde Camille de Rothschild (born 22 November 1933, died 23 August 2014) and Charles Henri de Rothschild (born and died 1938).

== World War II ==
The outbreak of World War II had serious consequences for the entire Rothschild family, who were Jewish. Following the German occupation of France, Philippe de Rothschild's parents fled to the safety of Lausanne, Switzerland, and the Paris mansion where they had lived became the headquarters for the German Naval Command.

Although he was called up to serve in the French Air Force, the quick fall of France resulted in de Rothschild being arrested in Algeria by the Vichy government and the vineyard property seized. His French citizenship was revoked on 6 September 1940 for what The New York Times described as "having left France without official permission or a valid reason." Released from Vichy custody on 20 April 1941, Philippe de Rothschild made his way to England, where he joined the Free French Forces of General Charles de Gaulle, earning a Croix de Guerre.

On his return to France following the Allies' liberation, Philippe de Rothschild learned that, although his daughter was safe, the Gestapo had, on charges of attempting to cross a line of demarcation with a forged permit, deported his estranged wife in 1941 to Ravensbrück concentration camp where she died – the cause of her death remains unresolved – on 23 March 1945. Élisabeth Pelletier de Chambure was the only member of the Rothschilds to be murdered in The Holocaust.

== Postwar ==
The vineyard restarted wine production by the early 1950s.

Rothschild returned to participation in the theatrical world, writing the play Lady Chatterley's Lover with Gaston Bonheur. Based on the D. H. Lawrence novel, their play was later made into a motion picture starring Danielle Darrieux. In 1952 Rothschild and Bonheur wrote the script for the film La Demoiselle et son revenant. He also translated Elizabethan poetry and the plays of Christopher Fry.

In 1954, Rothschild married Pauline Fairfax Potter (1908–1976).

In 1973, Château Mouton Rothschild became the only French vineyard to ever achieve reclassification to First Growth, thanks to decades of lobbying. Subsequently, the owner of Château d'Yquem sued unsuccessfully to have the reclassification reversed as illegitimate.

Rothschild purchased Château Clerc Milon, a fifth-growth classified vineyard strategically located next to his own property. In 1980, he announced a joint venture with American wine grower Robert Mondavi to form the Opus One Winery in Oakville, California.

Baron Philippe de Rothschild remained active in the wine business until he died in 1988 at the age of 85, whereupon his daughter assumed control of the company.

== Arts ==
In 1962 at Mouton the Rothschilds created the Museum of Wine in Art.

== Literature ==
In 1978 Mercure de France published Philippe de Rothschild's Le Pressoir perdu: poèmes. In 1981 Presses de la Cité published his Vivre la vigne: du ghetto de Francfort à Mouton Rothschild 1744-1981.

== See also ==
- List of wine personalities
