= Saint-Polycarpe =

Commune in Occitanie, France

- Commune
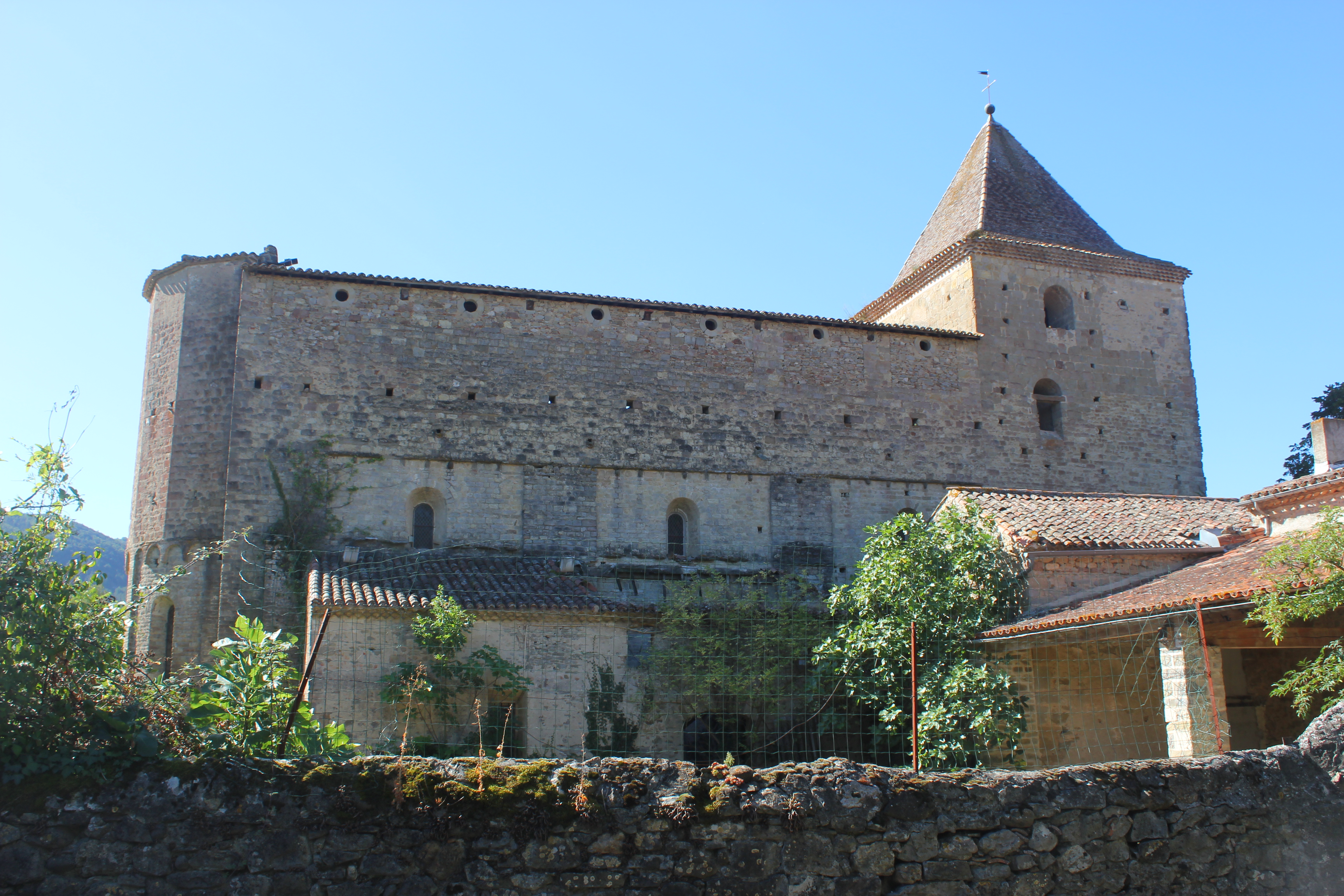
- Abbey church

- Coat of arms
- Location of Saint-Polycarpe
- Location within France Location within Occitanie
- Coordinates: 43°02′00″N 2°18′00″E
- Country: France
- Region: Occitania
- Department: Aude
- Arrondissement: Limoux
- Canton: La Région Limouxine

Government
  - Mayor (2020–2026): Jean Laffont
- Area^{1}: 13.81 km^{2} (5.33 sq mi)
- Highest elevation: 806 m (2,644 ft)
- Lowest elevation: 194 m (636 ft)
- Population (2023): 169
  - Density: 12.2/km^{2} (31.7/sq mi)
- Time zone: UTC+01:00 (CET)
  - Summer (DST): UTC+02:00 (CEST)
- INSEE/Postal code: 11364 /11300
- ^{1} French Land Register data, which excludes lakes, ponds, glaciers > 1 km^{2} (0.386 sq mi or 247 acres) and river estuaries.

Saint-Polycarpe (Languedocien: Sant Policarpi) is a commune in the Aude department in southern France.

== Population ==
Historical population
Year	Pop.	±% p.a.
1968	158	—
1975	175	+1.47%
1982	188	+1.03%
1990	200	+0.78%
1999	185	−0.86%
2007	171	−0.98%
2012	147	−2.98%
2017	147	+0.00%
2023	169	+2.35%
Source: INSEE

== See also ==
- Communes of the Aude department
- Domaine de Baronarques
