= Philippine de Rothschild =

French baroness and winemaker (1933–2014)

Philippine Mathilde Camille, Baroness de Rothschild (22 November 1933 – 23 August 2014) was the owner of the French winery Château Mouton Rothschild. She acted under the stage name Philippine Pascal (imprinting on her paternal grandfather Henri de Rothschild who also used the last name Pascal to write plays). She was the only daughter of the vintner Baron Philippe de Rothschild, a member of the Rothschild banking dynasty.

== Biography ==
Rothschild was born in Paris, France. At the time of her birth, her mother, Elisabeth Pelletier de Chambure, a French Catholic aristocrat, was not married to her father Philippe de Rothschild, but instead married to Jonkheer Marc de Becker-Rémy, a Belgian nobleman. After a legal skirmish and the Jonkheer's threats to kidnap his wife's child, the Becker-Rémys divorced in 1934. Shortly afterwards, Rothschild's mother and father eventually married that same year in Paris. By 1939, Philippe de Rothschild separated from Elisabeth, who reverted to using her maiden name.

Rothschild had one brother, Charles Henri de Rothschild, who was born in 1938 and died that same year.

When Philippine de Rothschild was ten years old, she witnessed the Gestapo arrest her mother, who later died at Ravensbrück concentration camp, the only known member of the Rothschild family to die during The Holocaust. The two Gestapo officers fought over taking Philippine along with her mother, but one officer argued that he had a daughter the same age back home, so they left her alone.

In 1958, she graduated from the Paris Conservatoire National d'Art Dramatique and acted in La Comédie Française with Catherine Deneuve. She played one of the leading roles in Harold and Maude with Madeleine Renaud between 1973 and 1980, and worked with the compagnie Renaud-Barrault until 1988.

She was made an Officier of the Légion d'Honneur in 2007, and in 2013 was given a lifetime achievement award by the Institute of Masters of Wine.

She died on 23 August 2014 at age 80, from "complications from surgery".

== Work in the wine business ==
Rothschild entered the board of directors of Château Mouton Rothschild's holding company in November 1971. In 1985, she introduced the Californian Opus One (Mondavi-Rothschild collaboration) to the French market, a daring move at the time. When Philippe died in 1988, Philippine inherited three estates in Bordeaux: Château Mouton Rothschild (bought by her great-great-grandfather Nathaniel de Rothschild in 1853), Château d'Armailhac, and Château Clerc Milon. She also became chairwoman and majority owner of Baron Philippe de Rothschild S.A. She became the first woman in five generations to lead the family's wine business.

In 1990, she asked the artist Francis Bacon to design the label of the Château Mouton Rothschild wine bottles. She introduced a second wine from the Château, Le Petit Mouton, and increased the production of Mouton Cadet. In 2004, she asked Prince Charles to design the bottles' label. During the 1990s, wine critics were very negative towards the quality of Mouton. She banned the 1993 Château Mouton Rothschild from exports in the USA because the label showed the drawing of a nude young woman drawn by Balthus (and was promoted with the explanation "The fragile and mysterious girl . . . seems to hint at some secret promise of undiscovered pleasure, a pleasure to be shared"), a drawing that led 300 wine producers to sign a petition against the distribution of the bottle.

At the time of her father's death, the company sold 1.3 million cases of wine a year. By 2000, sales had almost doubled to 2.1 million cases. In 1999, sales amounted to around $155 million (approximately $293 million in 2024 dollars).

Her wine holdings included Château Mouton Rothschild, Château d'Armailhac, Château Clerc Milon, Domaine de Lambert, Baron Arques, Baron Philippe de Rothschild, Mouton Cadet, Opus One and Viña Almaviva (in Chile).

== Marriages ==
Rothschild was married to:

- Jacques Noël Sereys (1928–2023), a French theatre director and actor, whom she wed on 4 March 1961 and divorced 25 October 1999. They have a daughter and a son:
  - Camille Sereys de Rothschild (born 1961)
  - Philippe Sereys de Rothschild (born 1963)
- Jean-Pierre de Beaumarchais (born 1944), a bibliographer and scholar, who is a relative of 18th-century playwright Pierre Beaumarchais. They have one son:
  - Julien de Beaumarchais de Rothschild (born 1971)

== Filmography ==
Year	Title	Role	Notes
1966	The Sultans	small role	Uncredited
1968	La Chamade	Claire	
1970	Children of Mata Hari	The female police officer	
1984	Un amour de Swann	Madame Gallardon	
1987	Maladie d'amour		(final film role)

== Bibliography ==
- de Rothschild, Philippine (1983). Mouton Rothschild: Paintings for the Labels 1945-1981. Little Brown & Co. ISBN 978-0821215555.
