= Hôtel Perrinet de Jars =

Coordinates: 48.8692°N 2.3199°E

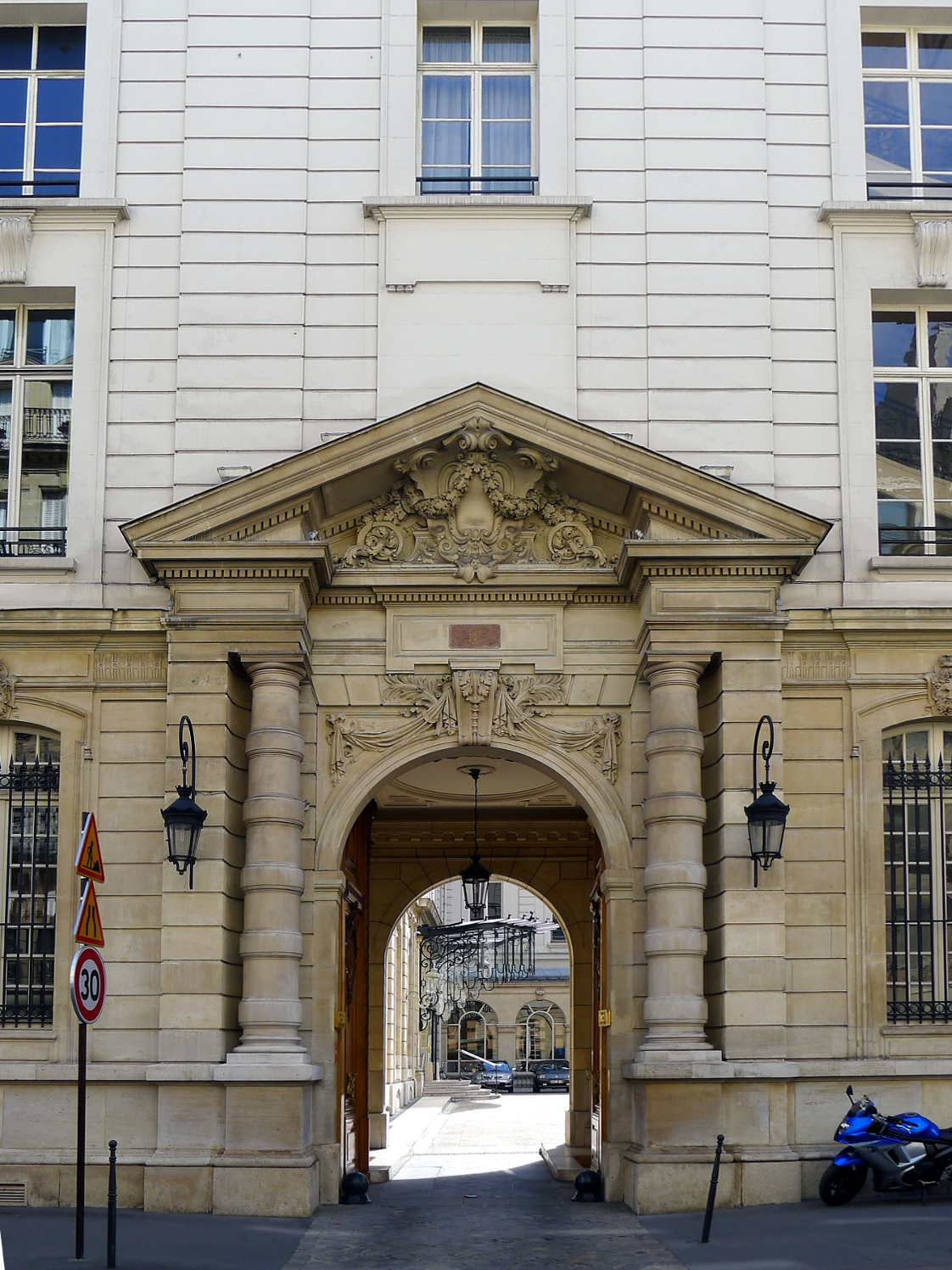
- Interactive map of the Hôtel Perrinet de Jars area
- Alternative names: Hôtel Henri de Rothschild

General information
- Type: Hôtel particulier
- Location: 33 rue du Faubourg Saint-Honoré, Paris, France
- Completed: 1714
- Client: Anne Levieux
- Owner: Cercle de l'Union interalliée

Design and construction
- Architects: Pierre Grandhomme; Jean-Michel Chevotet

The Hôtel Perrinet de Jars (also known as the Hôtel Henri de Rothschild) is a listed hôtel particulier in Paris, France. It is located at 33 rue du Faubourg Saint-Honoré in the 8th arrondissement of Paris.

== History ==
The building was built in 1714 by Pierre Grandhomme for Anne Le Vieux, the wife of the Parisian financier André Le Vieux. It then belonged to the fermier général Étienne Perrinet de Jars (who also owned the Château de Boucard), who gave it his name and had it transformed by King's architect Jean-Michel Chevotet.

It was acquired in 1810 by Denis, Duke of Decrès, Minister of the Navy under Napoleon I. From 1849, it was rented to the Russian embassy.

=== Rothschild years ===
In 1856, the hôtel was acquired from Marie-Rose, Duchess of Decrès, by Baron Nathaniel de Rothschild for FF 1,675,000. Almost immediately after purchasing the hôtel, Rothschild hired architects Emile Petit and Robillard to renovate the structure. Rothschild used the hôtel to display his collection of Old Master paintings, 18th century furniture, manuscripts and books. Rothschild died in 1870 and his widow, Charlotte de Rothschild, lived another 29 years.

After her death in 1899, the hôtel passed to their grandson, Baron Henri de Rothschild. During World War I, Henri de Rothschild turned over hôtel to the French government for its use during the conflict as a club for officers of the Allied armies.

=== Cercle de l'Union interalliée ===
In 1920, after the War ended, Henri de Rothschild sold the hôtel for the equivalent of today's €1,067,143, to the Cercle de l'Union interalliée, a private social and dining club. The Cercle continues to use the hôtel as their clubhouse to this day.

The hôtel has been listed as a monument historique since 1928.
