= Alone in Damascus =

1986 book

Alone in Damascus: The Life and Death of Eli Cohen
- Author: Samuel Segev
- Language: Hebrew
- Publication date: 1986

Alone in Damascus: The Life and Death of Eli Cohen is the story of Eli Cohen, a former Israeli spy. The book describes his life and death.

In 1986, the book was first published in Hebrew in Herzliya. A revised edition was published in 2012. In 1997, the book was translated from Hebrew to Arabic. In 1997, it was translated from Arabic to Persian.
