= Élisabeth de Rothschild =

French baroness (1902–1945)

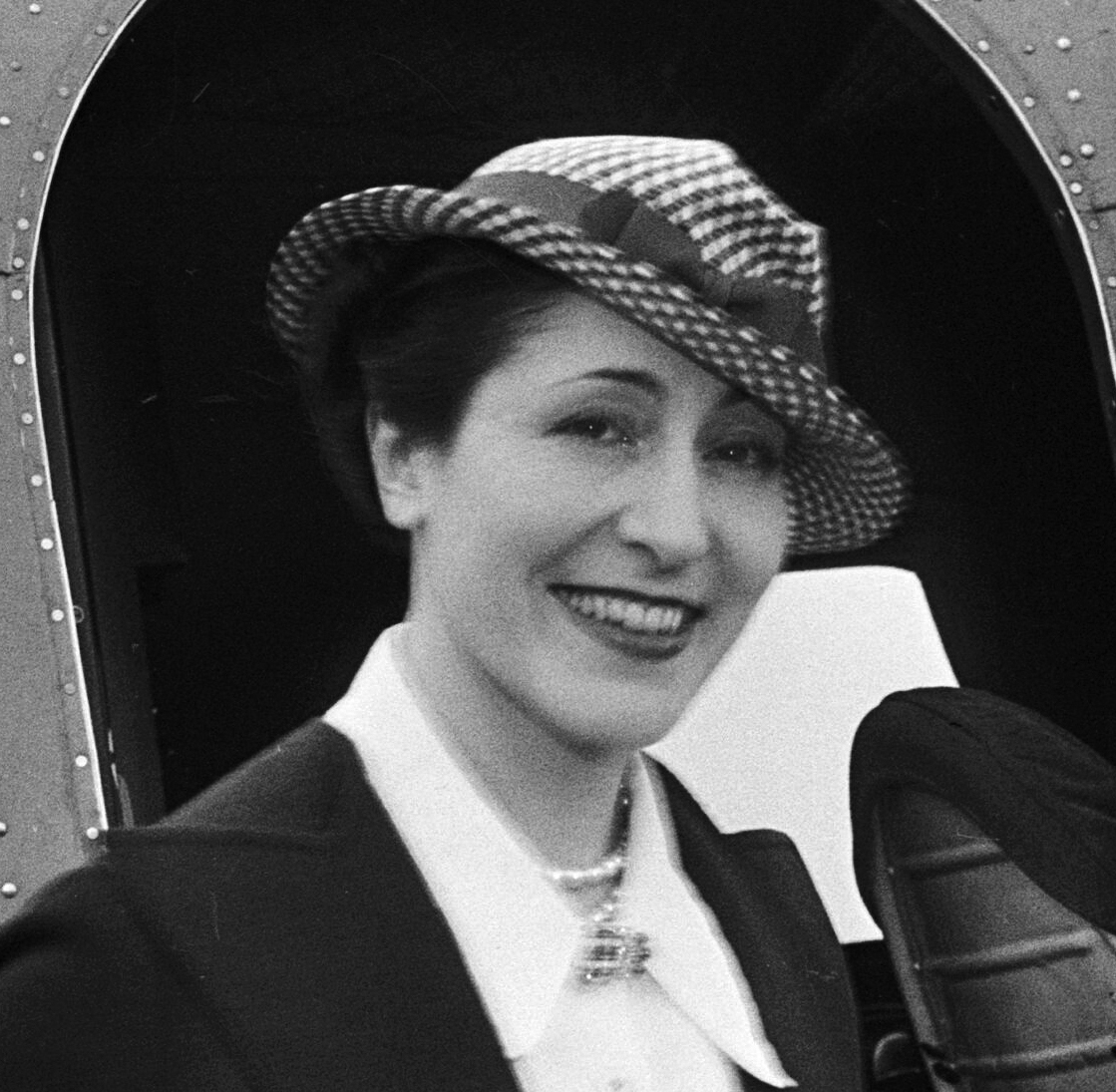
Élisabeth de Rothschild in 1935

Élisabeth, Baroness de Rothschild (née Pelletier de Chambure; a.k.a. Lili; 9 March 1902 – 23 March 1945) was a member by marriage of the wine-making branch of the Rothschild family and Holocaust victim.

== Biography ==
Born in Paris as Élisabeth Pelletier de Chambure, into a wealthy Catholic family whose roots were in the Burgundy region. Her ancestors included the Napoleonic general Laurent Augustin Pelletier de Chambure. Known as Lily, she was the daughter of Auguste Pelletier de Chambure, a mayor of Escrignelles, and his wife, née Camille Marie Courtois Desquibes.

In 1923, Élisabeth Pelletier de Chambure married Jonkheer Marc Edouard Marie de Becker-Rémy, a Belgian aristocrat. They had a son, Edouard Jacques Marie Augustin (1924-1984), and a daughter, Philippine Mathilde Camille (1933-2014), though the latter's biological father was French baron Philippe de Rothschild. Rothschild was a member of the prominent banking family and the owner of one of France's most famous vineyards, Château Mouton Rothschild in Pauillac in the Médoc; he was also a cousin by marriage of her husband.

On 22 January 1934, immediately after her divorce from Becker-Rémy, Élisabeth married Philippe de Rothschild. She converted to Judaism from Catholicism, and the religious ceremony was conducted by Julien Weill, the grand rabbi of Paris. In addition to their daughter, the Rothschilds had a son, Charles Henri (born and died in 1938). Philippe's memoirs (Milady Vine, written in collaboration with British director Joan Littlewood) describe his marriage to Élisabeth as one of great passion but also enormous tempestuousness and despair. The couple's difficulties increased when their son was born deformed and soon died. They eventually separated acrimoniously, and by 1939, the baroness reverted to using her maiden name of Pelletier de Chambure.

Following the German occupation of France in World War II, she and her estranged husband were arrested by the Vichy government and the vineyard property seized. They were then released, whereupon Philippe left France, moving to England, to join the Free French Forces and support General Charles de Gaulle. In 1941, the Gestapo arrested Élisabeth on charges of attempting to cross the line of demarcation with a forged permit and sent her to the Ravensbrück concentration camp, located about 50 miles north of Berlin, where she died.

Meryle Secrest tells a story in his biography of Elsa Schiaparelli that suggests Rothschild's death in a Nazi concentration camp was linked to her changing seats at Schiaparelli's fashion show to avoid the German Ambassador to the Vichy government, Heinrich Otto Abetz and not to the fact that she had converted to Judaism or tried to escape.

On his return to France following the Allies' liberation, Philippe de Rothschild learned that the Gestapo had, on charges of attempting to cross a line of demarcation with a forged permit, deported his estranged wife in 1941 to Ravensbrück concentration camp where she died. Élisabeth reportedly died of epidemic typhus on 23 March 1945 at Ravensbrück.
