= Moshe Segev =

Israeli celebrity chef (born 1973)

- משה שגב
- Born: September 29, 1973 (age 52); Jerusalem, Israel
- Education: Tadmor School, Schools in Thailand
- Culinary career
- Current restaurants: Segev Bar & Lounge; Petah Tikva – 日本のバーNihon no-ba – Segev Japanese; Segev Japanese Bar Hod HaSharon; Segev Express & Nihon Hod HaSharon; Segev Express Tel-Aviv; Segev Express Rishon LeZion; Segev Express North; Segev Natanya – Kosher chef kitchen
- Television shows: Open Cooking (בישול פתוח); Segev's Here to Cook (שגב בא לבשל); Excite Your Taste Buds with Segev (שגב בא לפנק); Around the World with Segev (שגב עולמי); Segev - the Show (שגב - המופע); Chef Swap (שף מתחלף); Segev's workers restaurant (מסעדת הפועלים של שגב); Segev's Basta (הבסטה של שגב); In Segev's Kitchen (אצל שגב במטבח)
- Website: https://www.segevchef.com/?lang=en

Moshe Segev (Hebrew: משה שגב; Better known as Segev Moshe (שגב משה); born 29 September 1973) is an Israeli celebrity chef, restaurateur, television presenter and cookbook author. Segev owns eight restaurants around Israel and has starred in many TV show mostly on Reshet. His restaurant "Segev" in Herzliya Pituah was ranked as one of Israel's top ten restaurants before it was closed in 2021 duo to economic losses after COVID-19.

He also served as the private chef of Israeli prime minister Benjamin Netanyahu. As part of the job he cooked for Japanese statesman Shinzo Abe and his wife, the meal included chocolates served in a metal shoe, which was considered offensive in Japanese culture. The incident garnered the media's attention and Israel's Foreign Ministry released a statement.

== Early life ==
Moshe Segev was born in Jerusalem, He grew up in Tel Aviv and at the age of 6 him and his family moved to Rishon LeZion. When he was 13 he started to work in the kitchen of a bowling in Rishon LeZion to earn money.

After his military service he studied Graphics and Design but later decided to start a culinary career. He studied culinary in Tadmor Hotel School, and in Thailand.

== Career ==
Segev started his culinary career at age 13 when he worked at a kitchen in a bowling place. After his military service he worked in the kitchen of Royal Beach Hotel in Eilat. Segev worked for many restaurants including Odeon, Spagetim, Rothschildes, Tamuz and more.

In 2002, Segev hosted a children cooking show called Open Cooking (בישול פתוח) and since then and since then had several cooking show of his own.

In 2004, Segev opened his first restaurant "Segev" in Herzelia, the restauran was closed in 2021 after the economic effects of COVID-19.

In 2008, the Segev restaurant in Herzelia was chosen to be on the list of the best restaurant in Israel by paper The Table.

Segev has published four cookbooks to date: "Diary of a Chef", "Segev Express", "From the Market to the Kitchen" and “My Family Kitchen".

In May 2018, he caused a diplomatic incident after serving a Japanese statesman a meal in a shoe, which was considered insensitive to Japanese culture.
