= Cercle de l'Union interalliée =

Parisian social and dining club founded in 1917

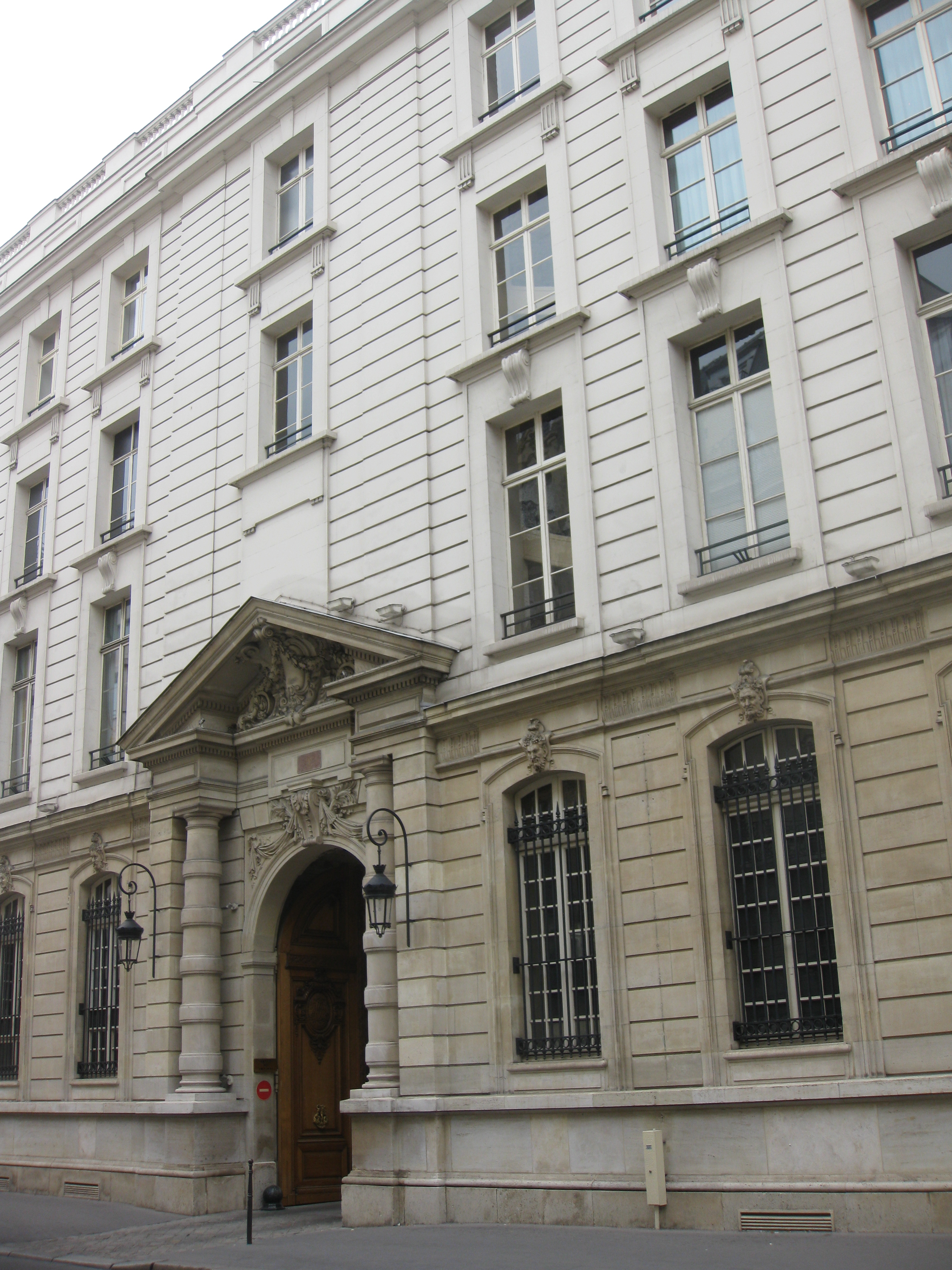
The clubhouse in Paris, also known as the Hôtel Perrinet de Jars

The cercle de l'Union interalliée, also known as the Cercle interallié, is a private sports, social and dining club established in 1917. The clubhouse is the Hôtel Perrinet de Jars at 33 rue du Faubourg Saint-Honoré in Paris, France. It adjoins the British Embassy and an annex of the embassy of Japan. Because of its very central Paris address (a stone's throw from the Place de la Concorde), its majestic interiors and its beautiful French gardens, the clubhouse is often considered as one of the most beautiful if not the most prestigious in France.

The club's second president was Ferdinand Foch, Marshal of France, Field Marshal of the United Kingdom, Marshal of Poland and supreme commander of the Allies of World War I. The club includes royalty and political figures among its international members.

The sports facility offers a 25m (5 lanes) swimming pool, squash courts, saunas, hammam, gym and training rooms, and is completed with a casual restaurant overlooking the swimming pool.

A formal club dining room on the 1st floor and out in the garden during the summer months complete this club's amenities.

== History ==
The Union Interalliée was founded in 1917, at the time of the official American entry into World War I. This was after the voluntary aviators from the Lafayette Escadrille had come to France to increase the number of those who were fighting for the same cause on French soil.

The founders of the Union Interalliée (the Count of Beaumont, Paul Dupuy, the Count J. de Bryas, Arthur Meyer, MJ of Sillac) suggested establishing a place of welcome providing moral and material resources to the officers and personalities of the Allied nations, in order to develop the allied life that had just begun.

Thanks to the support they received from several statesmen, ambassadors and field marshals and the assistance from new collaborators (Count of Andigne, Bardac, du Breuil Saint-Germain, André Citroën, L. Dumontet, the Count of Fels, who created, along with the former, the directing committee, chaired by Vice Admiral Fournier), they founded the Union Interalliée in one of the most beautiful mansions in Paris, the hotel Henri de Rothschild, which had been generously offered to them. In 1920, the club, having set up a real estate company, acquired the building for the equivalent of today's €1,067,143.

The war having ended, the need for the Union Interalliée was apparent to everybody, as it was more necessary than ever to maintain harmony between the people who had fought together. The work that had begun in 1917 received an official consecration in 1920 when the public authorities recognized its importance in diplomatic relations between the allied nations. On 1 June 1920, Marshal Foch became the second president of the Cercle.

Since 1980, the Union Interalliée houses on its 3rd and 4th floor a separate club, the Nouveau Cercle de l'Union. While all the members of that club are necessarily members of the Union Interalliée, this strictly social club has its own identity and holds separate events.

In 2004, Chilean-born American interior designer Juan Pablo Molyneux designed the interiors of the clubhouse.

== Club founders in 1917 ==
- Count Marc de Beaumont
- Marquis de Bryas
- Paul Dupuy
- Arthur Meyer
- Jean de Sillac
- Count d'Andigné
- S. Barbac
- Mr. du Breuil de Saint-Germain
- André Citroën
- Léon Dumontet
- Count Edmond de Fels
- Vice-admiral Fournier

== Presidents of the club ==
- 1917-1920 : Vice-Admiral Fournier
- 1920-1928 : Marshal of France Ferdinand Foch
- 1928-1935 : Jules Cambon
- 1935-1937 : Former President of France Gaston Doumergue
- 1938-1942 : Prince Charles-Louis de Beauvau-Craon
- 1942-1953 : Admiral Marie-Jean-Lucien Lacaze
- 1953-1959 : Count Stanislas de Castellane
- 1959-1975 : Prince Jean-Louis de Faucigny-Lucinge
- 1975-1999 : Count Jean Bonnin de La Bonninière de Beaumont
- 1999-2009 : Pierre-Christian Taittinger
- since 2009 : Count Denis de Kergorlay

== Notable members ==
- Alain Juppé
- Jean-Charles de Castelbajac
- Valéry Giscard d'Estaing
- André Citroën
- Nadine de Rothschild
- Maréchal Foch
- Jules Cambon
- Gaston Doumergue
- Hélène Carrère d'Encausse
- HRH Prince Jean of Luxembourg, Prince of Nassau
- Sir Li Ka-shing

== Reciprocal clubs in the world ==
There are a number of reciprocal clubs worldwide including:

- Australia : Tasmanian Club; Australian Club, Sydney; Melbourne Club; Athenaeum Club, Melbourne; Adelaide Club
- Belgium : Cercle Royal Gaulois
- Canada : Royal Canadian Yacht Club; Vancouver Club; Mount Royal Club; Royal Canadian Military Institute
- Colombia : Gun Club; Jockey Club
- England : Royal Automobile Club; The Arts Club; Carlton Club; East India Club; The Hurlingham Club; National Liberal Club; Naval & Military Club; Oxford and Cambridge Club; Reform Club; Savage Club; Cavalry and Guards Club; Royal Air Force Club
- Finland : Helsinki Bourse Club
- Germany : Industrie-Club, Düsseldorf; International Club Berlin, IC-B, Berlin; Übersee-Club e.V., Hamburg
- Hong Kong : Hong Kong Club, American Club of Hong Kong
- Italy : Circolo Canottieri Aniene, Rome; Circolo Artistico Tunnel, Genova; Circolo Bellini, Palermo; Circolo dell'Unione, Venezia;
- Japan : Tokyo American Club
- Kenya : Muthaiga Country Club
- Malta : The Casino Maltese
- Mexico: University Club
- The Netherlands: De Industrieele Groote Club, Amsterdam; Sociëteit De Witte, The Hague;
- Peru: Club Nacional
- Portugal : Club Portuense
- Singapore : Tanglin Club
- South Africa : The Cape Town Club
- Spain: Sociedad Bilbaina, Bilbao. Circulo Ecuestre, Barcelona.Real Gran Peña, Madrid
- Sweden : The Royal Bachelors' Club, Nya Sällskapet, Stockholm
- Switzerland : Club Baur au Lac, Grande Société de Berne
- Turkey : Circle D'orient
- United States : Harmonie Club of New York City, Army Navy Club of Washington, DC; Cosmos Club; Delaware Dining Society; Francisca Club, San Francisco; Harvard Club of Boston; Jonathan Club, Los Angeles; Los Angeles Athletic Club; Racquet Club of Philadelphia; Rainier Club, Seattle; Somerset Club, Boston; Standard Club of Chicago; Sulgrave Club, Washington, D.C.; Union Club of Boston; University Club of San Francisco; University Club of St. Louis; University Club of Washington, DC Metropolitan Club, San Francisco, CA; Yale Club of New York City, New York City; Century Association, New York City; Metropolitan Club, Washington, DC; Maryland Club, Baltimore, MD.
