= Opus One Winery =

Winery located in California

Coordinates: 38.441287°N 122.399988°W

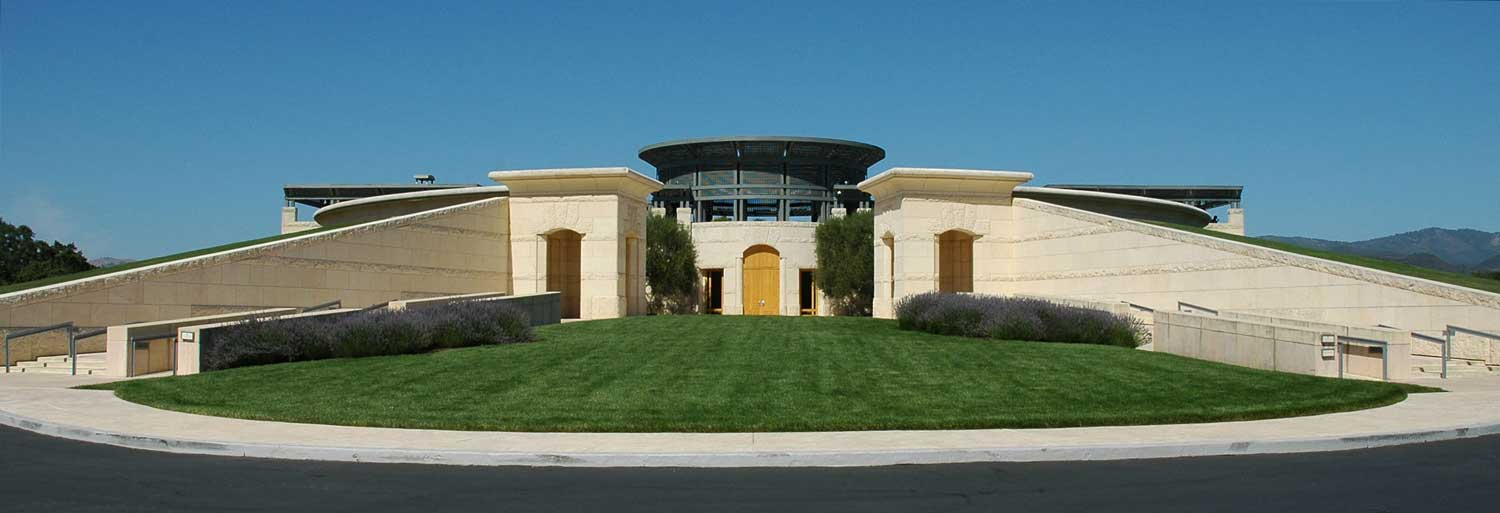
- Location: Oakville, California, USA
- Appellation: Oakville AVA
- Founded: 1978
- First vintage: 1979
- Key people: Robert Mondavi co-founder; Philippine de Rothschild, co-owner; Michael Silacci, Winemaker
- Parent company: BPhR, Constellation Brands
- Cases/yr: 25,000
- Known for: Opus One
- Varietals: Cabernet Sauvignon, Cabernet Franc, Merlot, Malbec, Petit Verdot
- Distribution: international
- Tasting: by appointment
- Website: opusonewinery.com

Opus One Winery is a winery in Oakville, California, United States. The wine was called napamedoc until 1982 when it was named Opus One. The winery was founded as a joint venture between Baron Philippe de Rothschild of Château Mouton Rothschild and Robert Mondavi to create a single Bordeaux style blend based upon Napa Valley Cabernet Sauvignon. It is located across State Route 29 from the Robert Mondavi Winery. The creation of this winery venture in 1980 was big news in the wine industry; de Rothschild's involvement added an air of respectability to the burgeoning Napa wine region. The first vintage, 1979 was released in 1984 at the same time as the 1980 vintage. For a while it was the most expensive Californian wine, and to date still ranks among the most expensive red wines produced in the Napa Valley, with the 2014 vintage retailing for $325 per bottle. In 1989 a new winery was built just down the road, the first vintage from the new winery was from 1991 and was released in 1994.

Since 1993, they have produced a second wine, Overture.

== History ==
A bottle and glass of 1991 Opus One

The genesis of Opus One wine can be traced to 1970 at the Mauna Kea Beach Hotel on the Big Island of Hawaii where Robert Mondavi and Baron Philippe de Rothschild met for the very first time and began their collaboration to merge old world and new world wine styles into one grand opus. The joint venture between Mondavi and Baron Rothschild was announced in 1980, though plans for the winery had been developing between the two men since the early 1970s.

The first vintage was made in 1979 with grapes from Mondavi's To Kalon Vineyard in the Oakville AVA. In 1980, Mondavi sold 35 acres of this vineyard to the joint venture that would serve as the backbone for the blend. The first vintage from this block was released in 1985. From 1989 to 1991, the estate built the large limestone winery in Oakville that has become an icon of the Napa Valley.

In the 1990s, Opus One became the California cult wine to be widely sold in Asia and Europe. Following Constellation Brands' 2004 takeover of Robert Mondavi winery, the estate of Baron Rothschild negotiated with Constellation Brands control of marketing, vineyard management, and administration of the winery.

== Winery ==
Opus One's first vintage was in 1979, but the construction of the Opus One Winery started ten years later. It was built in front of the Mondavi winery. The winery, designed by architect Scott Johnson, was conceived to sit in the continuity of the cratered terrain of the valley floor, with a classical allure.

The winery sits atop a high water table, which made the excavation delicate. Its soil is warmed by nearby geothermal springs.

The winery contains 108 acres of vines, with a distribution of 2,200 vines per acre.
