= Samuel Segev =

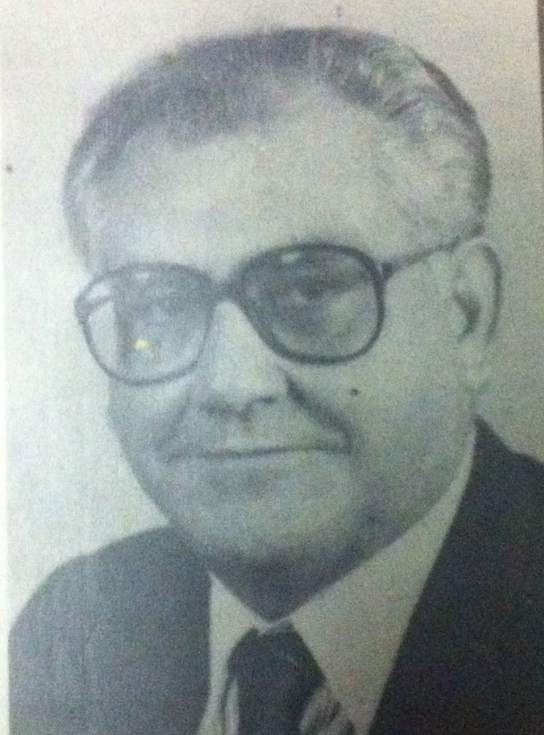

Samuel Segev (Hebrew: שמואל סגב; 15 April 1926 – 9 August 2012) was an Israeli journalist and author. A long-term writer for Maariv, he also wrote for the Canadian Winnipeg Free Press and was a visiting professor at Hofstra University.

== Books ==
- The Iranian Triangle: The Untold Story of Israel’s Role in the Iran-Contra Affair, Free Press, 1988, on the Iran-Contra Affair
- Crossing the Jordan, Israel's Hard Road to Peace, St. Martin's Press, 1998. ISBN 978-0312155063
- The Moroccan Connection: The secret ties between Israel and Morocco, Matar Books, 2008 (in Hebrew).
- Eli Cohen, Alone in Damascus (2012), on Israeli spy Eli Cohen
