= Château Mouton Rothschild =

French wine estate

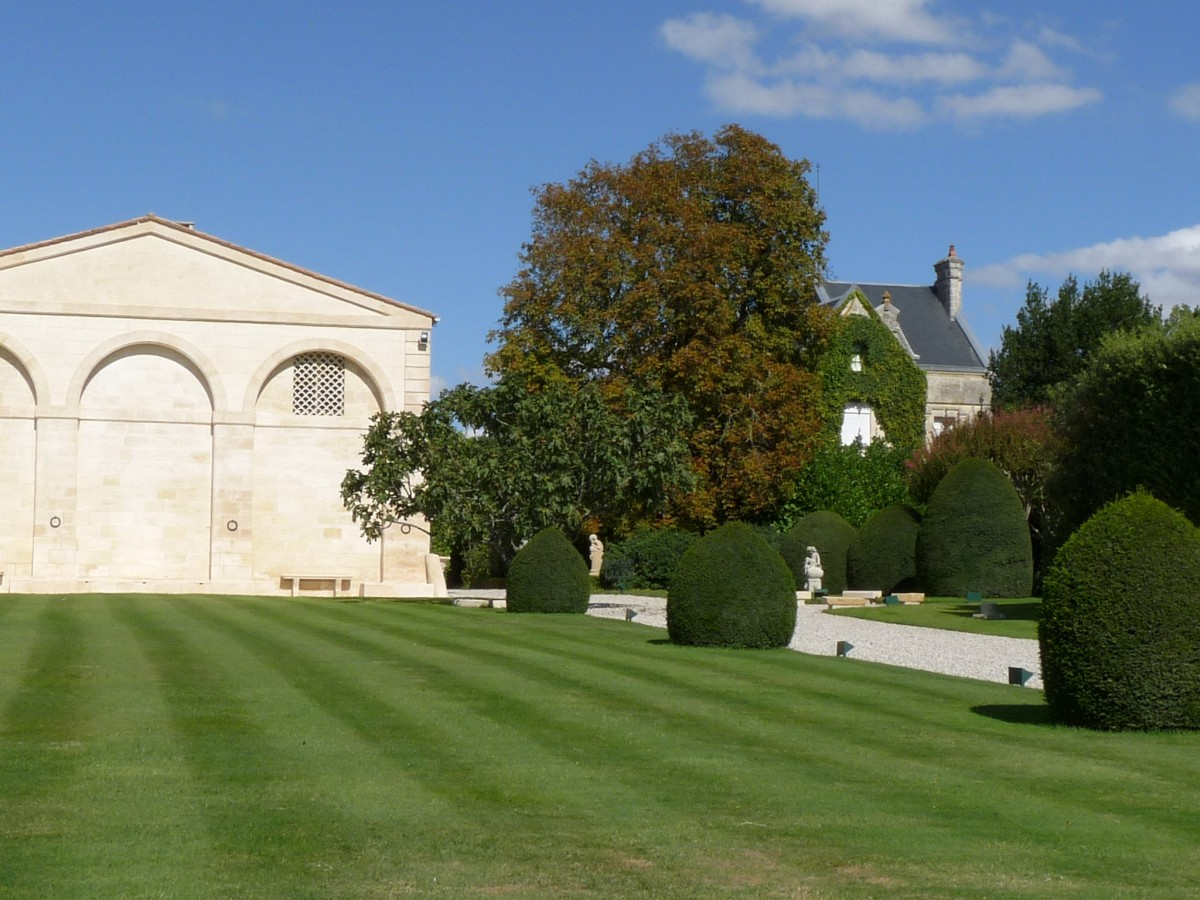
- Coordinates: 45.2153°N 0.7684°W
- Wine region: Bordeaux
- Appellation: Pauillac
- Key people: Philippe Sereys de Rothschild CEO
- Parent company: Baron Philippe de Rothschild SA
- Known for: Château Mouton Rothschild Pauillac AOC 1er Grand Cru Classé
- Varietals: Cabernet Sauvignon, Merlot, Cabernet Franc
- Website: https://www.chateau-mouton-rothschild.com/

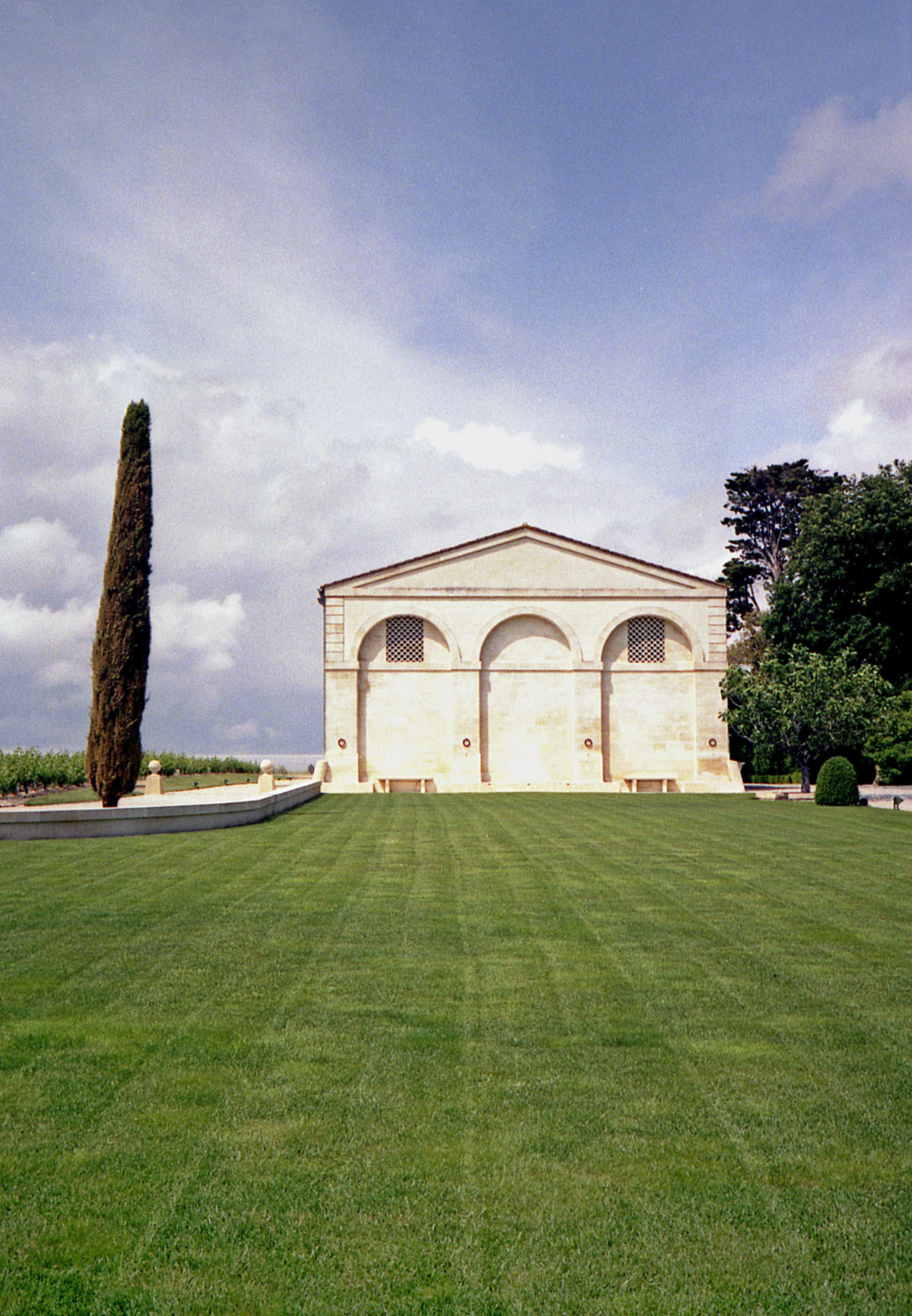
Château Mouton Rothschild

Château Mouton Rothschild is a wine estate located in the village of Pauillac in the Médoc region, 50 km (30 mi) north-west of the city of Bordeaux, France. Originally known as Château Brane-Mouton, its red wine was renamed by Nathaniel de Rothschild in 1853 to Château Mouton Rothschild. In the 1920s it began the practice of bottling the harvest at the estate itself, rather than shipping the wine to merchants for bottling elsewhere.

The branch of the Rothschild family owning Mouton Rothschild are members of the Primum Familiae Vini.

== History ==
In 1718, Château Mouton and Château Calon-Ségur were acquired by Nicolas-Alexandre de Ségur, who already owned Château Lafite and Château Latour. With the death of Nicolas-Alexandre Ségur in 1755, his estate was divided among four daughters.

The Bordeaux Wine Official Classification of 1855 was based entirely on recent market prices for a vineyard's wines, with one exception: Château Mouton Rothschild. Despite the market prices for their vineyard's wines equalling that of Château Lafite Rothschild, Château Mouton Rothschild was excluded from First Great Growth status, an act that Baron Philippe de Rothschild referred to as "the monstrous injustice". It is believed that the exception was made because the vineyard had recently been purchased by an Englishman and was no longer in French ownership.

In 1973, Mouton was elevated to "first growth" status after decades of intense lobbying by its powerful and influential owner, the only change in the original 1855 classification (excepting the 1856 addition of Château Cantemerle). This prompted a change of motto: previously, the motto of the wine was Premier ne puis, second ne daigne, Mouton suis. ("First, I cannot be. Second, I do not deign to be. Mouton I am."), and it was changed to Premier je suis, Second je fus, Mouton ne change. ("First, I am. Second, I used to be. Mouton does not change.")

== Vineyards ==
Château Mouton Rothschild has its vineyards on the slopes leading down to the Gironde Estuary, in the Bordeaux region, mainly producing grapes of the Cabernet Sauvignon variety. Today, Château Mouton Rothschild has 222 acres (90 ha) of grape vines made up of Cabernet Sauvignon (81%), Merlot (15%), Cabernet Franc (3%) and Petit Verdot (1%). Their wine is fermented in oak vats (they are one of the last châteaux in the Médoc to use them) and then matured in new oak casks. It is also frequently confused with the widely distributed generic Bordeaux Mouton Cadet.

== Labels ==
Baron Philippe de Rothschild came up with the idea of having each year's label designed by a famous artist of the day. In 1946, after the success of the 1945 label, this became a permanent and significant aspect of the Mouton image with labels created by some of the world's great painters and sculptors.

Artists such as Salvador Dalí, Francis Bacon, Picasso, Miró, Anish Kapoor, Jeff Koons and David Hockney have designed labels for bottles of Mouton Rothschild.

Few exceptions are to point:

To celebrate the hundredth anniversary of the acquisition of Château Mouton, the portrait of Baron Nathaniel de Rothschild appeared on the 1953 label.

The 1973 label was dedicated to Pablo Picasso who died 8 April the same year.

In 1977, the Queen Mother Elizabeth visited the Château and a special label was designed to commemorate the visit.

In 1978 when Montreal artist Jean-Paul Riopelle submitted two designs. Baron Philippe de Rothschild liked them equally so he split the production run and used both designs.

In 1987 Baroness Philippine de Rothschild dedicated the label to her father Baron Philippe de Rothschild died on 20 January 1988.

The 1993 Mouton label, a pencil drawing of a nude reclining nymphet by the French painter Balthus was rejected for use in the United States by the Bureau of Alcohol, Tobacco and Firearms. As such, for the U.S. market the label was made with a blank space where the image should have been and both versions are sought after by collectors.

An unusual gold enamel bottle was made for the 2000 vintage.

The 2003 label marks the 150th anniversary of Mouton's entry into the family. Baron Nathaniel is depicted on the label in a period photograph. The background shows part of the deed of sale.

The popularity of the label images results in auction prices for older and more collectible years being far out of sync with the other first growths, whose labels do not change year to year.

The 2013 vintage has the work of Korean artist Lee Ufan.

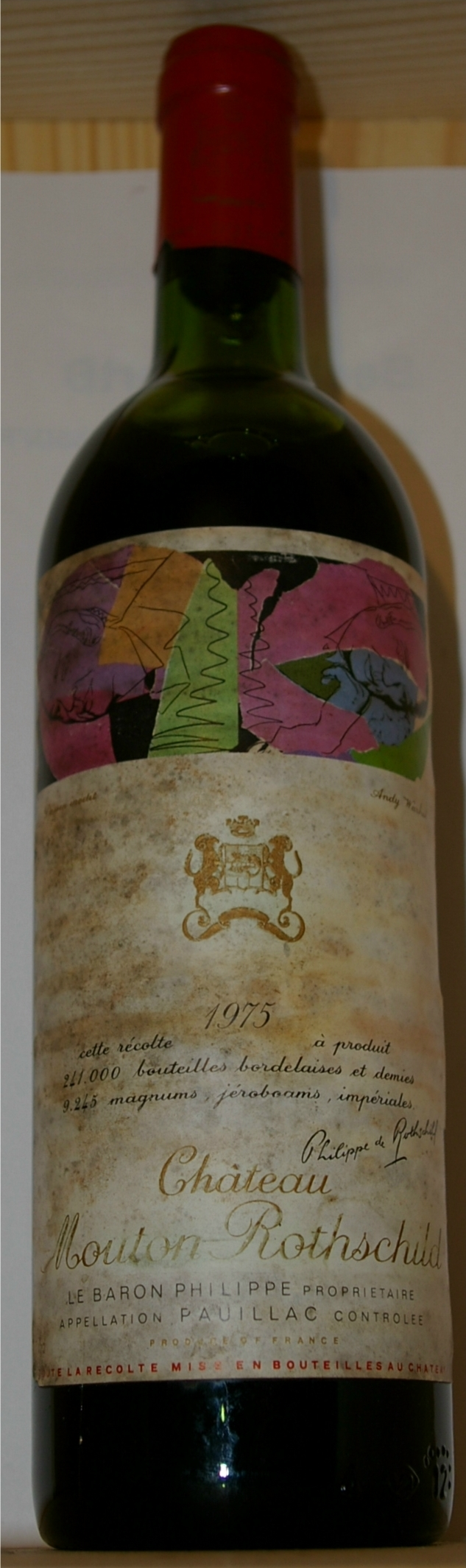
1975

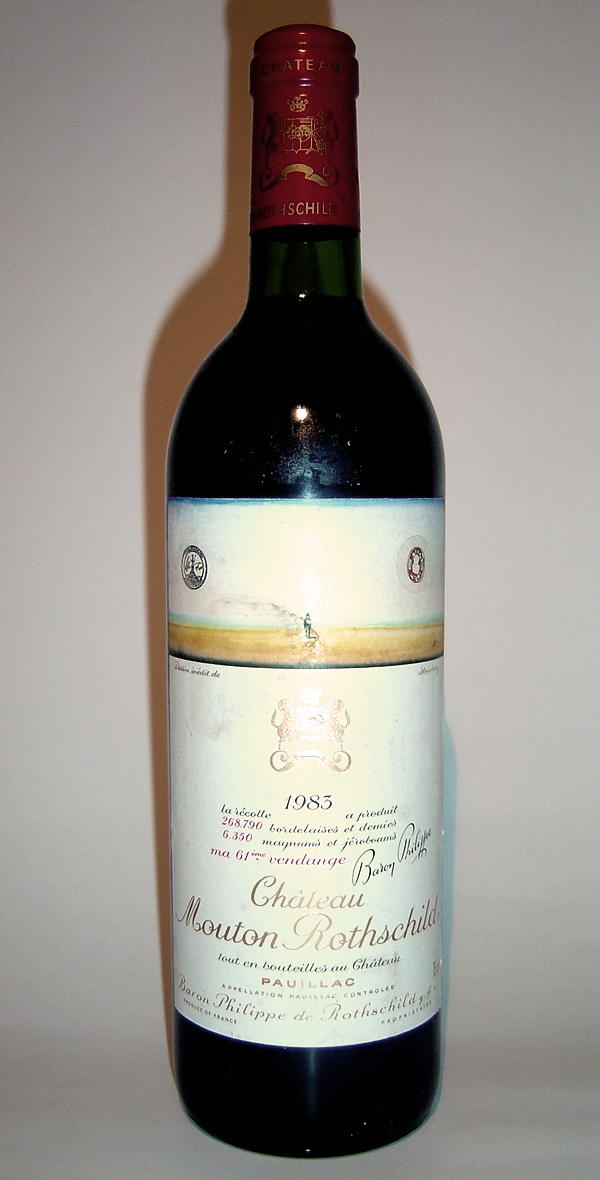
1983

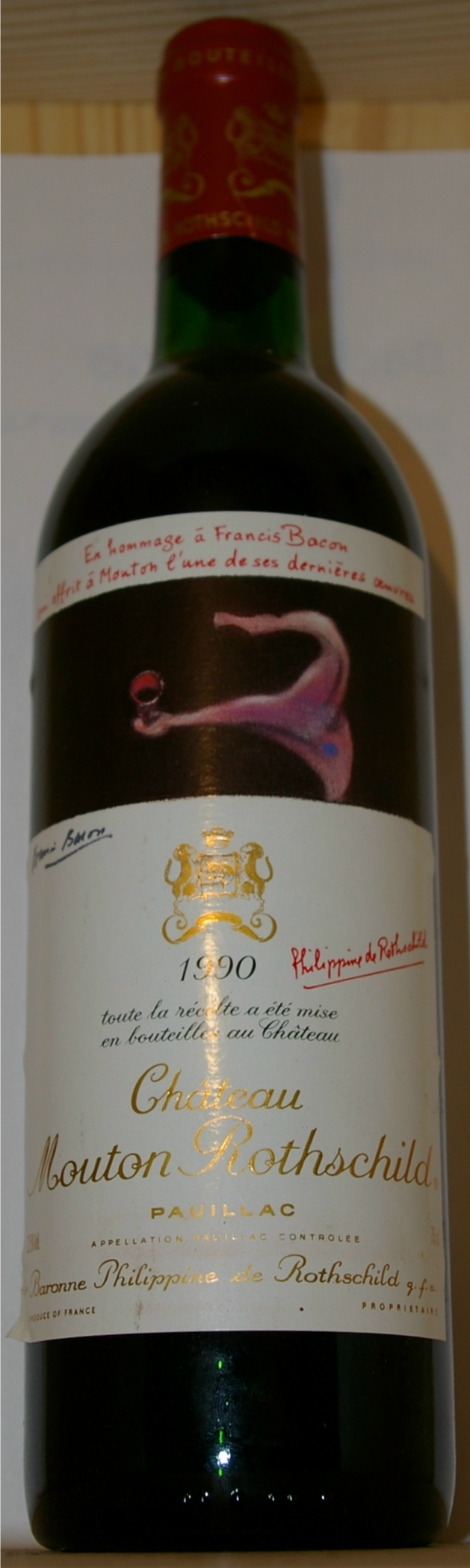
1990

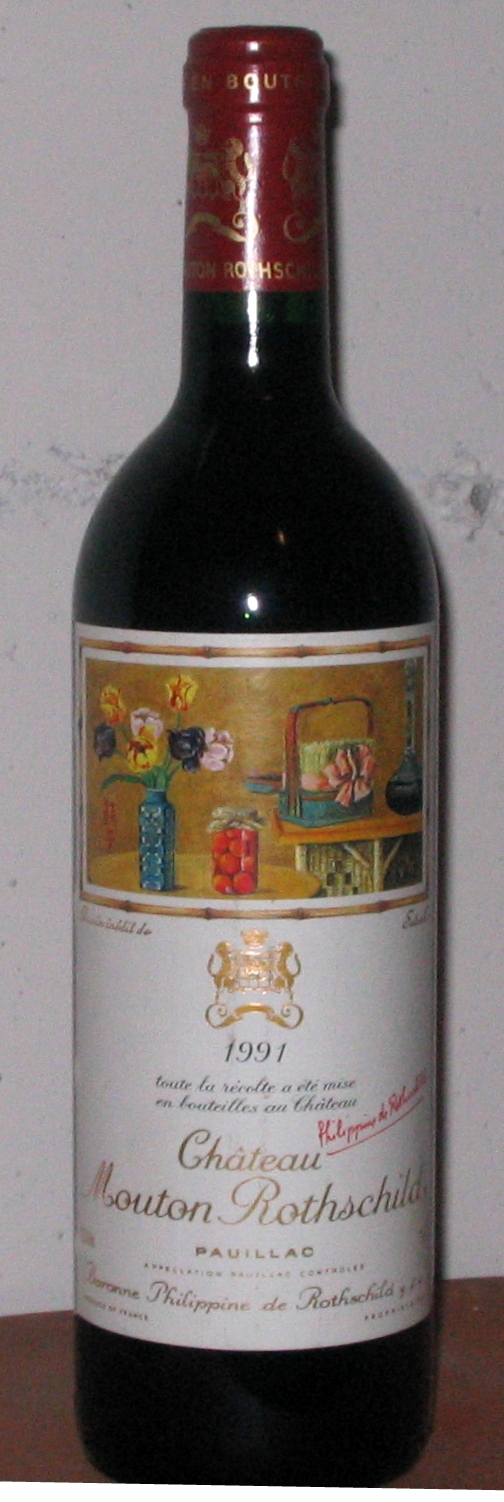
1991

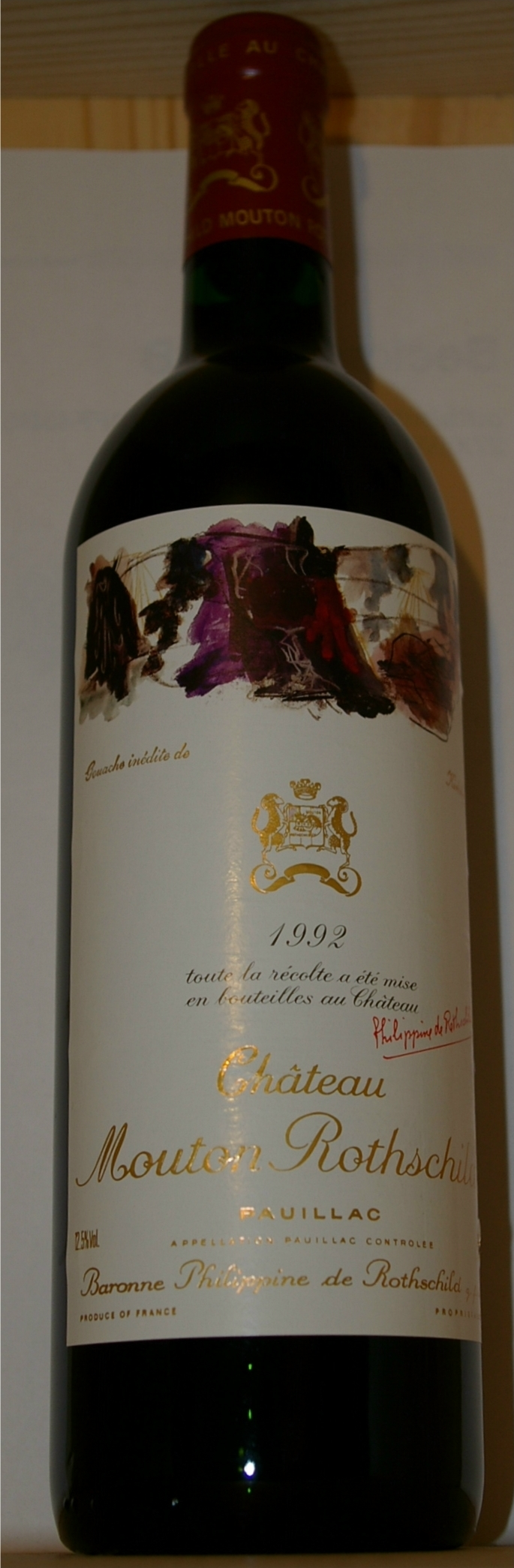
1992

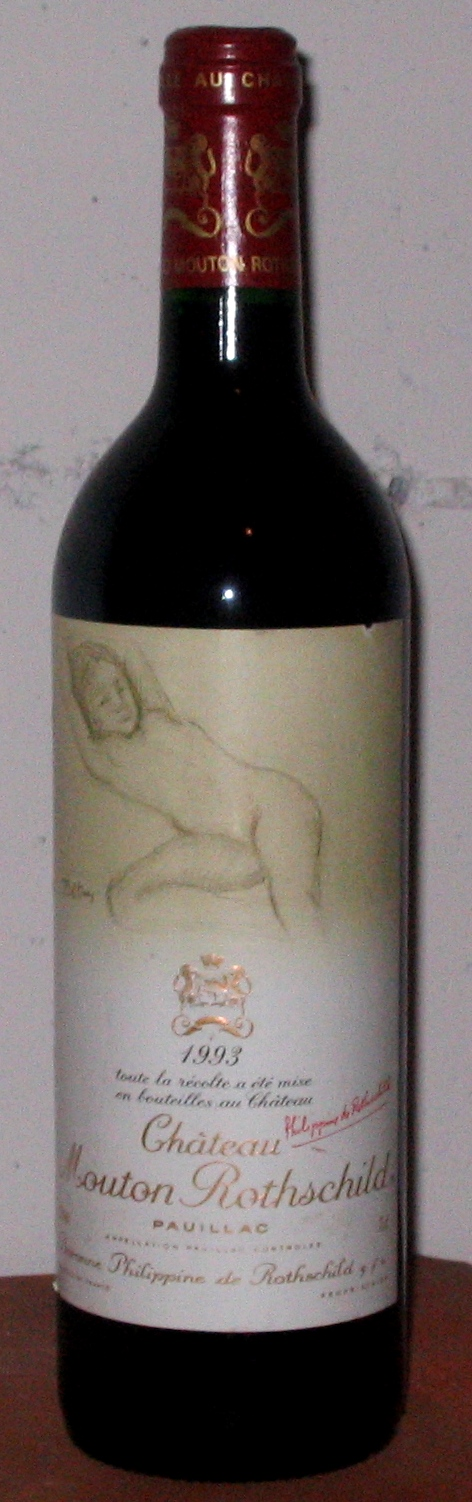
1993

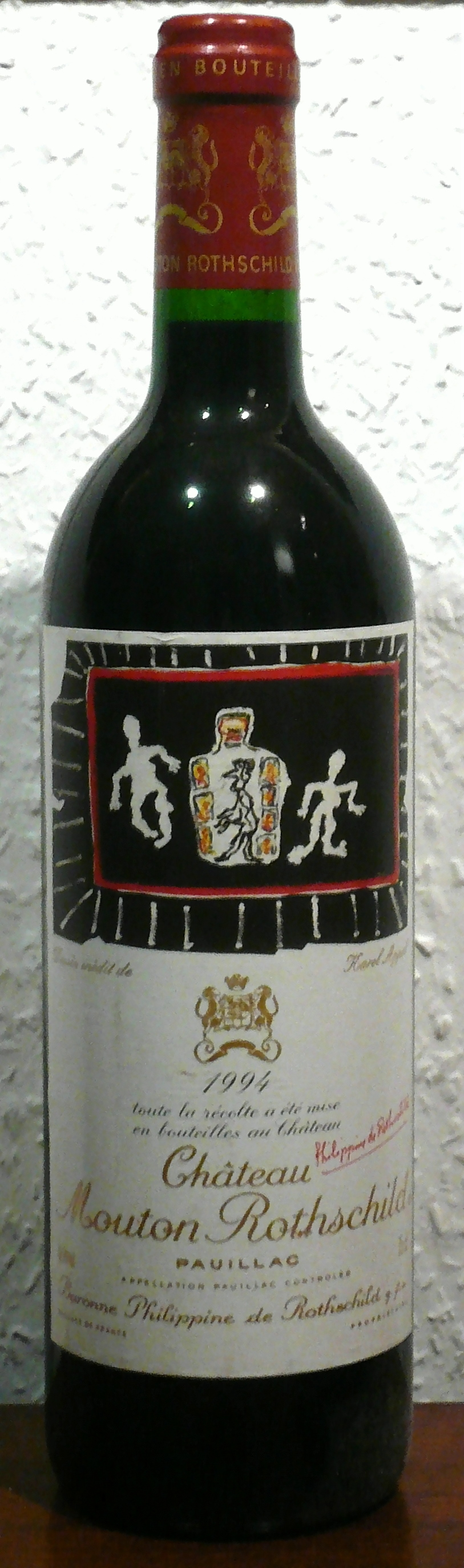
1994

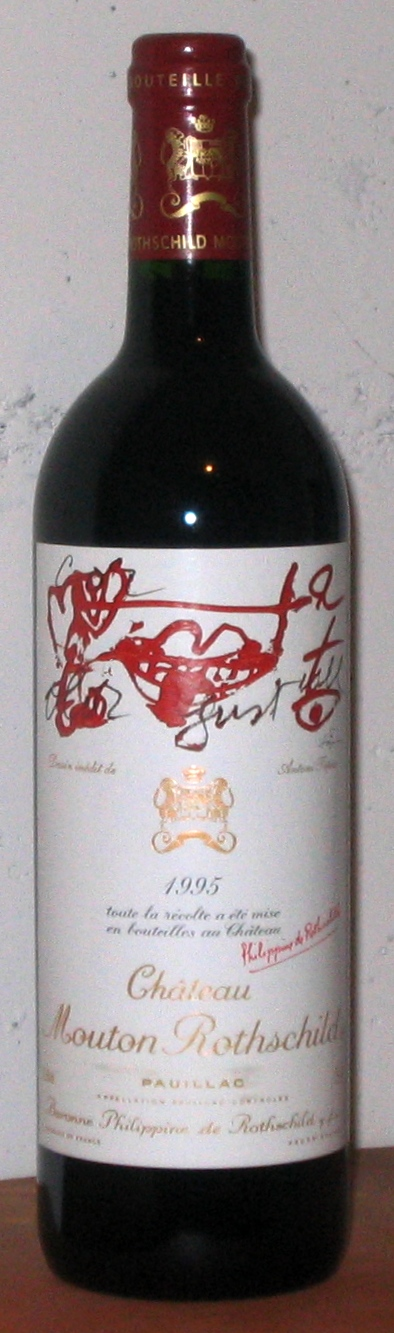
1995

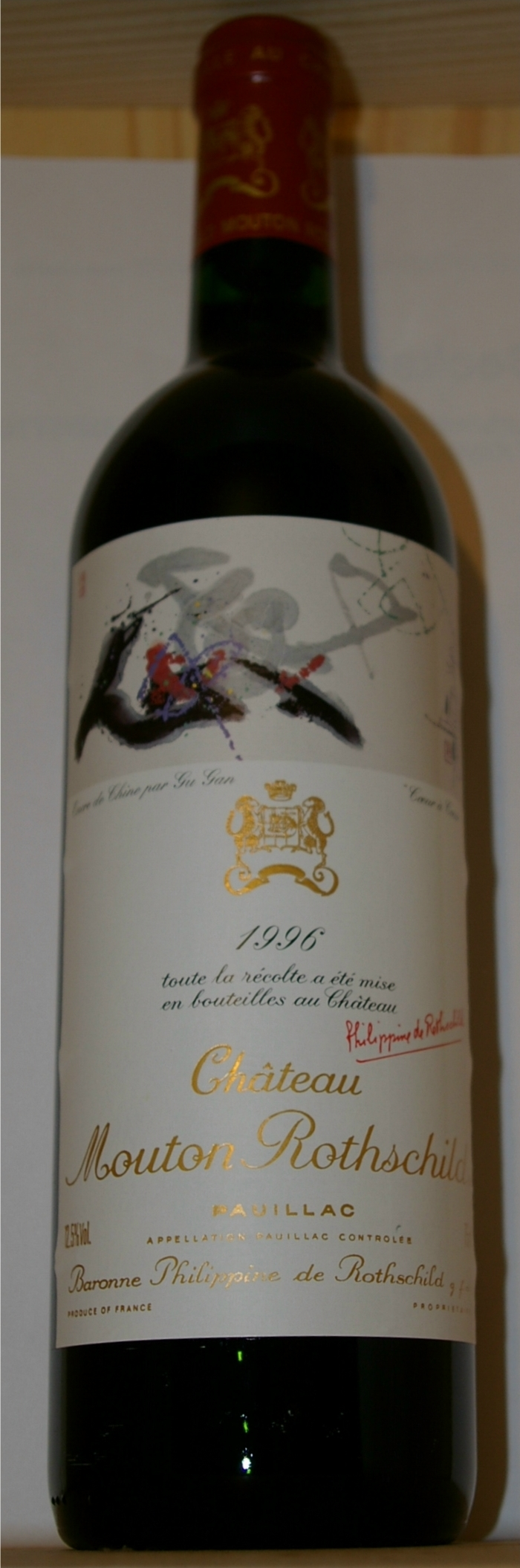
1996

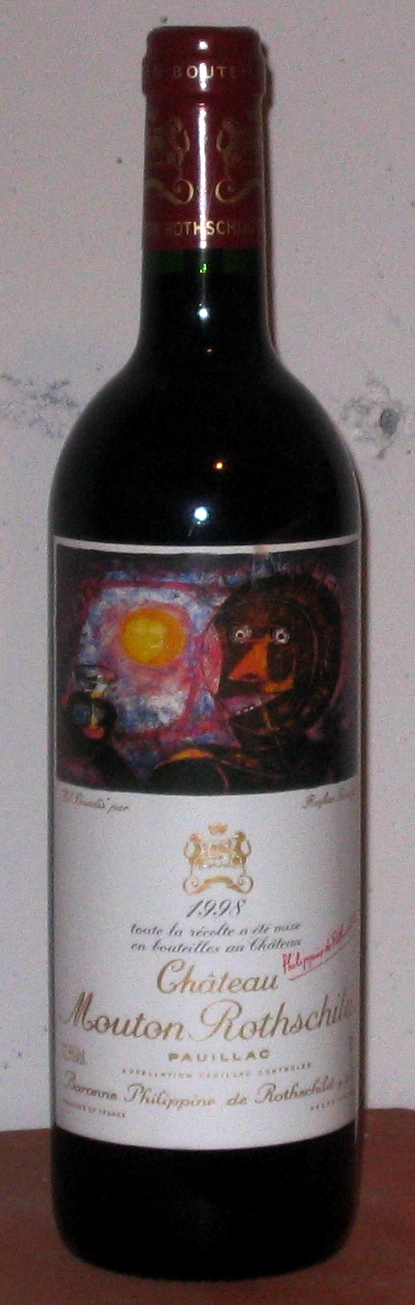
1998

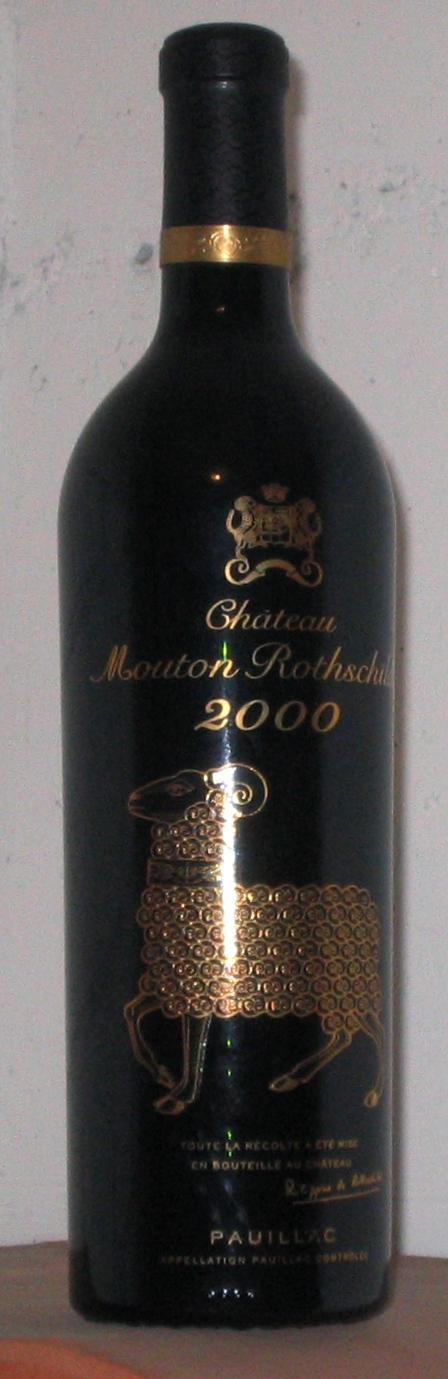
2000

== Price ==
The grand vin, Château Mouton Rothschild, is one of the world's most expensive and highly rated wines, with the average price of a 750ml bottle reaching $604.

== Business dealings ==
In 1978, the company Baron Philippe de Rothschild officially announced their joint venture with Robert Mondavi to create Opus One Winery in Oakville, California. The 1990s saw large-scale expansion in the Americas under the leadership of President Cor Dubois, with the region eventually contributing almost half of the company's turnover. In 1998, Baron Philippe de Rothschild SA teamed up with Concha y Toro of Chile to produce a quality premium red wine in a new winery/bodega built in Chile's Maipo Valley: Almaviva. The same year saw the launch of Escudo Rojo, a fine Chilean branded wine.

In June 2003, the vineyard hosted La Fête de la Fleur at the end of Vinexpo to coincide with their 150th anniversary.

2013 : new range of three Chilean varietal wines (Sauvignon blanc, Carmenere and Cabernet Sauvignon) was launched in 2013 under the name Anderra. In the same time, in order to secure grape supplies and ensure the development of its Chilean branded wines business, Baron Philippe de Rothschild acquired 960 hectares from Viña Villavicencio.

== Judgment of Paris ==
The 1970 vintage took second place, and was the highest ranked French wine, at the historic 1976 Judgment of Paris wine competition.

== In popular culture ==
In John Updike's 1954 short story "Friends from Philadelphia", first published by The New Yorker, the protagonist, John, attempts to buy a bottle of wine for his parents's dinner party, but he is denied, being too young to purchase alcohol. His parents are college educated, though not necessarily very wealthy. He seeks the help of his friend's parents at a nearby house as his home is about a mile up the road. His friend's parents are not college educated, though they have a good deal of money. They agree to accompany him to the store and to purchase the wine for him. He has $2.00, which his mother gave him, with which to purchase the wine, and, after a car ride in a brand new Buick during which he becomes embarrassed when questioned about what kind of car his father drives, John gives his friend's father the money. His friend's father, in what seems to be an active gesture of financial superiority signifying his internal struggle with the inferiority of his own education, purchases a bottle of Château Mouton Rothschild 1937, and gives it to John along with $1.26 in change. John goes home to the dinner party somewhat dismayed, for the wrong reason, that he failed to follow his mother's instructions to buy a bottle that is "inexpensive but nice."

Château Mouton Rothschild wine plays a brief, but important part in the 1971 James Bond film Diamonds Are Forever. After Bond (Sean Connery) tastes a glass of Mouton Rothschild 1955, he casually remarks that he had expected a claret with the grand dinner he has been served. When the villain Mr. Wint (Bruce Glover) replies that the cellars are poorly stocked with clarets, Bond exposes Wint's ignorance, pointing out that Mouton Rothschild, in fact, is a claret.

Roald Dahl cites it as one of the world's greatest wines in his short story "The Butler", from More Tales of the Unexpected.

In the film Weekend at Bernie's, a bottle of Mouton Rothschild 1982 is visible on the table during the scene where Bernie (Terry Kiser) proposes having his two employees killed and framed for his insurance fraud.

In Agatha Christie's short story "The Labors of Hercules", the story opens with Hercule Poirot speaking with Dr. Burton over a glass of Chateau Mouton Rothschild. Dr. Burton describes the wine as "Very good wine, this. Very sound."

In The Spy (TV series) approximately 5 minutes from the start of the episode #3 Alone in Damascus, the Israeli spy Eli Cohen (Sacha Baron Cohen) orders a bottle of Mouton Rothschild 1945 during the scene in the restaurant on his marine trip from Buenos Aires: "I'll have the '45 Château Mouton Rothschild". He does so just to show off his wealth and become noticed by a wealthy Syrian businessman from Damascus, Sheikh Majid Al-Ard.

== See also ==
- Château Lafite Rothschild
