= Genealogy of the Rothschild family =

The Rothschild family is a European family of German Jewish origin that established European banking and finance houses from the late eighteenth century.

The Rothschild family was founded by Mayer Amschel Rothschild, the "founding father of international finance". Wanting his sons to succeed on their own and to expand the family business across Europe, he had his eldest son remain in Frankfurt, while his four other sons were sent to different European cities with the mission of establishing a financial institution to invest in business and provide banking services. Endogamy within the family was an essential part of the Rothschild strategy in order to ensure control of their wealth remained in family hands. Through their collaborative efforts, the Rothschilds rose to prominence in a variety of banking endeavours including loans, government bonds and trading in bullion. Their financing afforded investment opportunities and during the 19th century they became major stakeholders in large-scale mining and rail transport ventures that were fundamental to the rapidly expanding industrial economies of Europe.

Five lines of the Austrian branch of the family were elevated into the Austrian nobility, being given hereditary baronies of the Habsburg Empire by Emperor Francis II in 1816. The British branch of the family was elevated into the British nobility by Queen Victoria in 1855. Queen Victoria had initially disliked the proposal by Prime Minister William Ewart Gladstone to raise Lionel de Rothschild to the peerage. However, in 1855, Victoria raised Lionel's son, Nathan Rothschild, 1st Baron Rothschild, to the peerage; he became the first Jewish member of the House of Lords.

This article shows the family tree of some of the prominent branches of the Rothschild family.

== The founder and his children ==
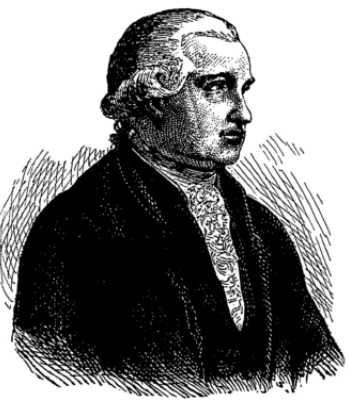
Mayer Amschel Rothschild

Mayer Amschel Rothschild was born in 1744 in the ghetto in Frankfurt. At the age of 13, he went to Hanover to serve an apprenticeship with the bank of Simon Wolf Oppenheimer. At the age of 19, he returned to Frankfurt. There he joined his brother Calmann's money-changing business. He became a dealer in rare coins and won the patronage of Wilhelm IX of Hesse, gaining the title of "court factor". Rothschild's coin business expanded through the provision of banking services to Wilhelm IX. His bank became one of the biggest in Frankfurt.

He married Guttle Schnapper in 1770. With her, he had 10 children.

- Mayer Amschel Rothschild (1744–1812), banker
  founder of the dynasty
  m. 1770: Gertrude Schnapper (1753–1849)
  - Schönche Jeannette Rothschild (1771–1859)
    m. 1795: Benedikt Moses Worms (1772–1824)
    genealogy of "Worms" (not carrying the name Rothschild)
  - Amschel Mayer Rothschild (1773–1855), banker
    m. 1796: Eva Hanau (1779–1848)
    only representative of Rothschild banking family of Germany (no descendants)
  - Salomon Mayer Rothschild (1774–1855), banker
    founder of § Rothschild banking family of Austria
  - Nathan Mayer Rothschild (1777–1836), banker
    founder of § Rothschild banking family of England
  - Isabella Rothschild (1781–1861)
    m. 1802: Bernhard Juda Sichel (1780–1862)
    genealogy of "Sichel" (not carrying the name Rothschild)
  - Babette Rothschild (1784–1869)
    m. 1808: Siegmund Leopold Beyfus (1786–1845), banker
    genealogy of "Beyfus" (not carrying the name Rothschild)
  - Carl Mayer Rothschild (1788–1855), banker
    founder of § Rothschild banking family of Naples
  - Julie Rothschild (1790–1815)
    m. 1811: Mayer Levin Beyfus (1790–1860), banker
    genealogy of "Beyfus" (not carrying the name Rothschild)
  - Henriette Rothschild (1791–1866)
    m. 1815: Abraham Montefiore (1788–1824), banker
    genealogy of "Montefiore" (not carrying the name Rothschild)
  - James Mayer Rothschild (1792–1868), banker
    founder of § Rothschild banking family of France

== Rothschild banking family of Austria ==
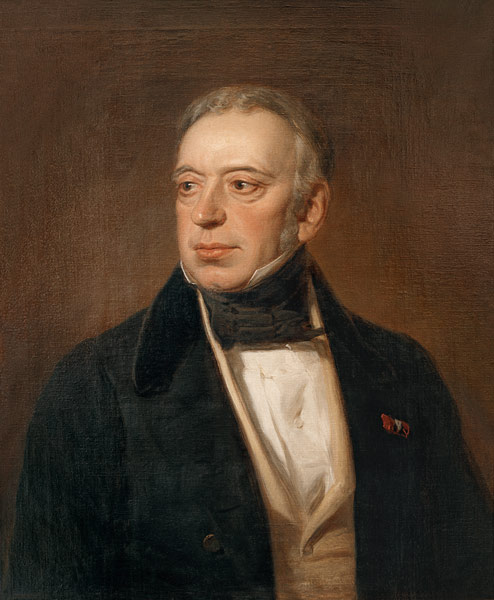
Salomon Mayer von Rothschild

Salomon Mayer von Rothschild, the second son, went to Austria and established S M von Rothschild in Vienna. He married Caroline Stern, with whom he had two children (a daughter and a son).

- Mayer Amschel Rothschild (1744–1812), banker
  founder of the dynasty
  m. 1770 : Gertrude Schnapper (1753–1849)
  - Salomon Mayer von Rothschild (1774–1855), banker
    founder of Rothschild banking family of Austria
    m. Caroline Stern (1782–1854)
    - Anselm Salomon von Rothschild (1803–1874), banker
      m. 1826 : Charlotte von Rothschild (1807–1859)
      see § Rothschild banking family of England
      - Julie von Rothschild (1830–1907)
        m. 1850 : Adolph Carl von Rothschild (1823–1900)
        see § Rothschild banking family of Naples
      - Mathilde Hannah von Rothschild (1832–1924)
        m. 1849 : Wilhelm Carl von Rothschild (1828–1901), banker
        see § Rothschild banking family of Naples
      - Nathaniel Anselm von Rothschild (1836–1905), socialite
      - Ferdinand James von Rothschild (1839–1898), politician and art collector
        m. 1865 : Evelina Gertrude de Rothschild (1839–1866), socialite
        see § Rothschild banking family of England
      - Albert Salomon von Rothschild (1844–1911), banker
        m. 1876 : Bettina Caroline de Rothschild (1858–1892)
        see § Rothschild banking family of France
        - Georg Anselm Alphonse de Rothschild (1877–1934)
        - Alphonse Meyer de Rothschild (1878–1942)
          m. 1912 : Clarice Sebag-Montefiore
        - Charlotte Esther von Rothschild (1879–1885)
        - Louis Nathaniel de Rothschild (1882–1955), banker
          m. 1915 (1) : Maria de Rothschild (1894–1937)
          m. 1946 (2) : Countess Hildegarde Karoline Johanna Maria von Auersperg
        - Eugène Daniel von Rothschild (1884–1976)
          m. 1925 (1) : Countess Erwein von Schönborn-Buchheim (née Catherine "Kitty" Wolf)
          m. 1952 (2) : Jeanne Stuart
        - Valentine Noemi von Rothschild (1886–1969)
          m. Baron Sigismund von Springer
        - Oskar von Rothschild (1888–1909)
      - Alice Charlotte von Rothschild (1847–1922), socialite
    - Betty Salomon de Rothschild (1805–1886)
      m. 1824 : James Mayer de Rothschild (1792–1868)
      see § Rothschild banking family of France

== Rothschild banking family of England ==
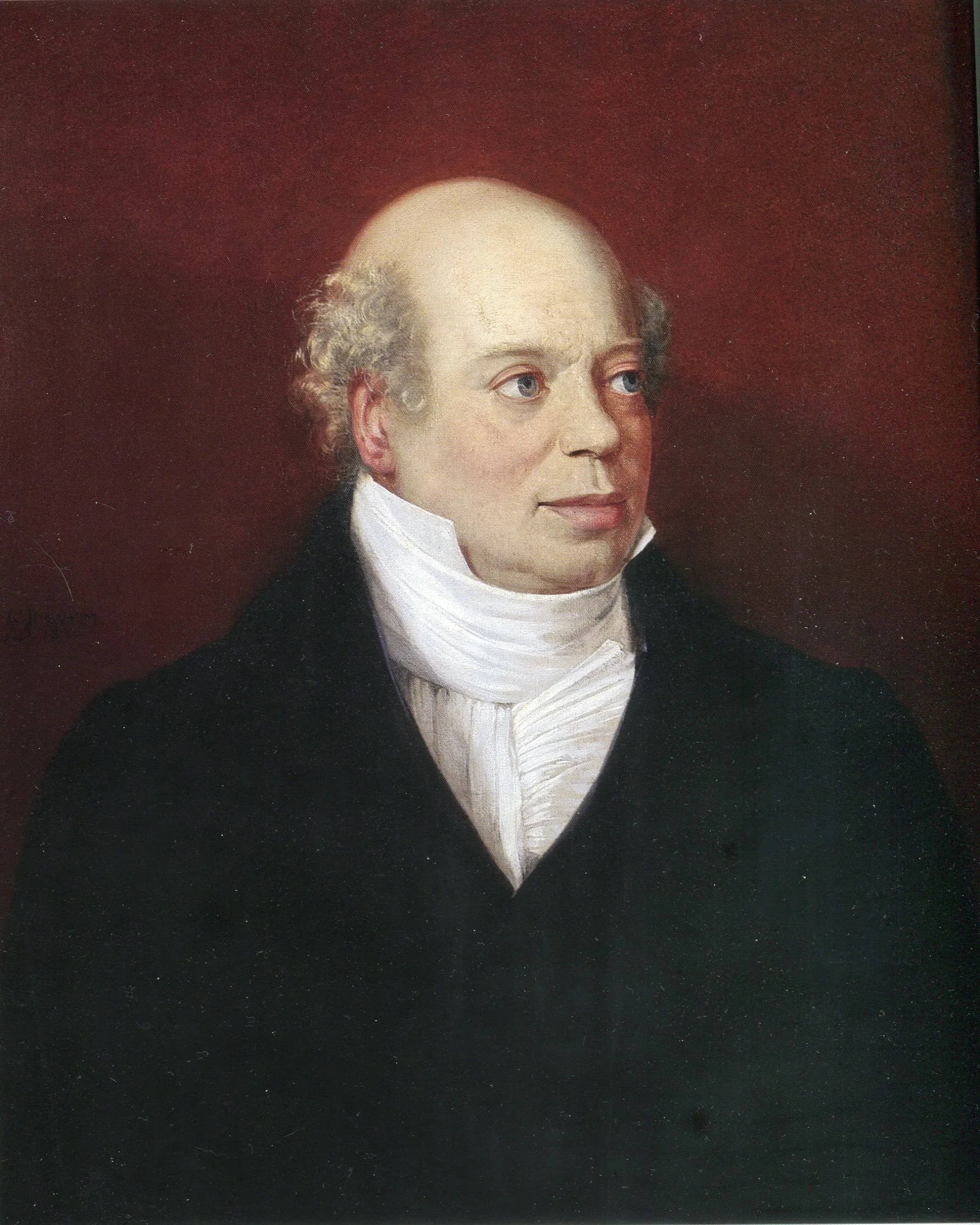
Nathan Mayer Rothschild

Nathan Mayer Rothschild, the third son, went to England and settled in Manchester but then moved to London. He first established a textile jobbing business in Manchester and from there went on to establish N M Rothschild & Sons in London. He married Hannah Barent Cohen in 1806, with whom he had seven children (three daughters and four sons).

- Mayer Amschel Rothschild (1744–1812), banker
  founder of the dynasty
  m. 1770 : Gertrude Schnapper (1753–1849)
  - Nathan Mayer Rothschild (1777–1836), banker
    founder of Rothschild banking family of England
    m. 1806 : Hannah Barent Cohen (1783–1850)
    - Charlotte von Rothschild (1807–1859)
      m. 1826 : Anselm Salomon von Rothschild (1803–1874), banker
      see § Rothschild banking family of Austria
    - Lionel de Rothschild (1808–1879), banker and politician
      m. 1836 : Charlotte von Rothschild (1819–1884)
      see § Rothschild banking family of Naples
      - Leonora von Rothschild (1837–1911)
        m. 1857 : Alphonse James de Rothschild (1827–1905), banker and vineyard owner
        see § Rothschild banking family of France
      - Evelina Gertrude de Rothschild (1839–1866), socialite
        m. 1865 : Ferdinand James von Rothschild (1839–1898), politician and art collector
        see § Rothschild banking family of Austria
      - Nathan Mayer Rothschild, 1st Baron Rothschild (1840–1915), banker and politician
        m. 1867 : Emma Louise von Rothschild (1844–1935)
        see § Rothschild banking family of Naples
        - Walter Rothschild, 2nd Baron Rothschild (1868–1937), banker, politician and zoologist
          without legitimate offspring
        - Charles Rothschild (1877–1923), banker and entomologist
          m. 1907 : Rózsika Edle von Wertheimstein (1870–1940)
          - Miriam Rothschild (1908–2005), natural scientist (zoology, entomology, and botany)
            m. 1943 : George Lane (1915–2010)
          - Victor Rothschild, 3rd Baron Rothschild (1910–1990), biologist
            m. 1933 : Barbara Hutchinson (1911–1989)
            - Jacob Rothschild, 4th Baron Rothschild (1936–2024), banker
              m. 1961 : Serena Dunn (1935–2019), philanthropist
              - Nathaniel Rothschild, 5th Baron Rothschild (1971–), financier
                m. 1995; div. 1998 : Annabelle Neilson (1969–2018), socialite
                m. 2016 : Loretta Basey (b. 1990), former Page 3 model
            - Emma Georgina Rothschild (1948–), economic historian
              m. 1991 : Amartya Sen (1933–), economist and philosopher
            - Amschel Mayor James Rothschild (1955–1996), banker
              m. 1981 : Anita Patience Guinness (1957–)
              - Kate Emma Rothschild (1982–)
                m. 2003 : Ben Goldsmith (1980–), financier
              - Alice Miranda Rothschild (1983–)
                m. 2013 : Zac Goldsmith (1975–), politician
              - James Amschel Victor Rothschild (1985–)
                m. 2015 : Nicky Hilton (1983–), businesswoman and model
                - Lily Grace Victoria Rothschild (2016–)
                - Teddy Marilyn Rothschild (2017–)
      - Alfred Charles de Rothschild (1842–1918), banker
        director of The Bank of England
        - Almina Herbert, Countess of Carnarvon (1876–1969)
      - Leopold de Rothschild (1845–1917), banker
        m. 1881 : Marie Perugia (1862–1937)
        - Lionel Nathan de Rothschild (1882–1942), banker and politician
          - Edmund Leopold de Rothschild (1916–2009), banker
            - Katherine Juliette de Rothschild (1949-)
              m. 1971: Marcus Agius (1946–), financer
              the chairman of Barclays
            - Nicolas David de Rothschild (1951-), land owner
            - David Lionel de Rothschild (1955-), writer and photographer
            - Charlotte Henriette de Rothschild (1955–), soprano
        - Evelyn Achille de Rothschild (1886–1917), banker, soldier
          died in action after the Battle of Mughar Ridge
        - Anthony Gustav de Rothschild (1887–1961), banker
          m. 1926 : Yvonne Cahen d'Anvers (1899–1977)
          - Evelyn Robert de Rothschild (1931–2022), banker
            m. 1966 : Jeannette Bishop (1940–1981)
            - Jessica de Rothscild (1974-)
            - Anthony James de Rothschild (1977–)
              m. 2006 : Tania Strecker (1973–), model
            - David Mayer de Rothschild (1978–), adventurer and environmentalist
    - Anthony Nathan de Rothschild (1810–1876), banker
      m. 1840 : Louise Montefiore (1821–1910)
    - Nathaniel de Rothschild (1812–1870), vineyard owner (Château Mouton Rothschild)
      founder of the French wine-making branch of the Rothschild family
      m. 1842 : Charlotte de Rothschild (1825–1899)
      see § Rothschild banking family of France
      - James Nathan de Rothschild (1844–1881)
        m. 1871 : Laura von Rothschild (1847–1931)
        see § Rothschild banking family of Naples
        - Henri James de Rothschild (1872–1947), playwright
          m. 1895 : Mathilde Weissweiller (1872–1926)
          - Philippe de Rothschild (1902–1988), race-car driver and vineyard owner (Château Mouton Rothschild)
            m. 1935 : Elisabeth Pelletier de Chambure (1902–1945)
            - Philippine de Rothschild (1933–2014), actress and vineyard owner (Château Mouton Rothschild)
        - Jeanne Sophie de Rothschild (1874–1929), philanthropist, builder of Château de Montvillargenne
      - Arthur de Rothschild (1851–1903)
    - Mayer Amschel de Rothschild (1818–1874), politician, horse breeder
      m. 1850 : Juliana Cohen (1831–1877)
      - Hannah de Rothschild (1851–1890)
        m. 1878 : Archibald Primrose, 5th Earl of Rosebery (1847–1929), Prime Minister of the United Kingdom
    - Louise von Rothschild (1820–1894)
      m. 1842 : Mayer Carl von Rothschild (1820–1886)
      see § Rothschild banking family of Naples

== Rothschild banking family of Naples ==
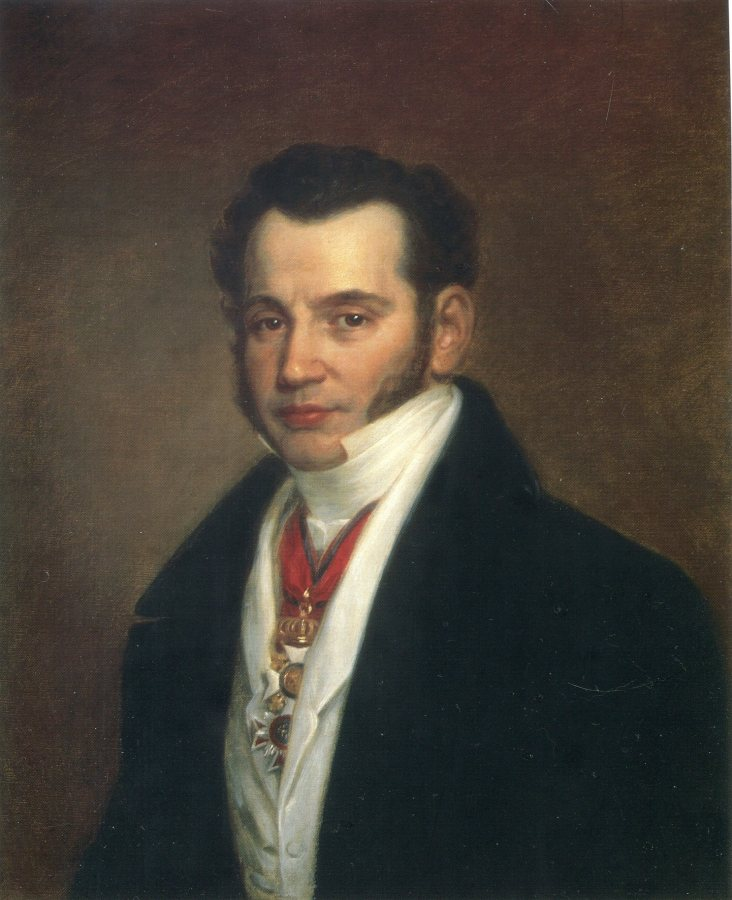
Carl Mayer von Rothschild

Carl Mayer von Rothschild, the fourth son, went to Naples and established C M de Rothschild & Figli. He married Adelheid Herz in 1818. With her, he had five children (a daughter and four sons), all of whom married within the family.

- Mayer Amschel Rothschild (1744–1812), banker
  founder of the dynasty
  m. 1770 : Gertrude Schnapper (1753–1849)
  - Carl Mayer von Rothschild (1788–1855), banker
    founder of Rothschild banking family of Naples
    m. 1818 : Adelheid Herz (1800–1853)
    - Charlotte von Rothschild (1819–1884), socialite
      m. 1836 : Lionel de Rothschild (1808–1879), banker
      see § Rothschild banking family of England
    - Mayer Carl von Rothschild (1820–1886)
      m. 1842 : Louise von Rothschild (1820–1894)
      see § Rothschild banking family of England
      - Adèle von Rothschild (1843–1922)
        m. 1862 : Salomon James de Rothschild (1835–1864), banker
        see § Rothschild banking family of France
      - Emma Louise von Rothschild (1844–1935)
        m. 1867 : Nathan Mayer Rothschild, 1st Baron Rothschild (1840–1915), banker and politician
        see § Rothschild banking family of England
      - Clementine Henriette von Rothschild (1845–1865)
      - Laura Thérèse von Rothschild (1847–1931)
        m. 1871 : James Nathan de Rothschild (1844–1884)
        see § Rothschild banking family of England
      - Hannah Luise von Rothschild (1850–1892)
      - Margarethe von Rothschild (1855–1905)
        m. 1878 : Agenor de Gramont (1851–1925)
      - Bertha Clara von Rothschild (1862–1903)
        m. 1882 : Alexandre Berthier (1836–1911), 3rd prince of Wagram
    - Adolph Carl von Rothschild (1823–1900), banker
      m. 1850 : Julie von Rothschild (1830–1907)
      see § Rothschild banking family of Austria
    - Wilhelm Carl von Rothschild (1828–1901), banker
      m. 1849 : Mathilde von Rothschild (1832–1924)
      - Adelheid von Rothschild (1853–1935)
        m. 1877 : Edmond James de Rothschild (1845–1934), banker
        see § Rothschild banking family of France
      - Minna Caroline von Rothschild (1857–1903)
        m. 1878 : Maximilian Benedikt Hayum Goldschmidt (1843–1940), banker
        (Goldschmidt-Rothschild in 1878, Baron von Goldschmidt-Rothschild in 1903)
        - Baron Erich Max Benedikt von Goldschmidt-Rothschild (1843–1940)
          m. 1925 Countess Veronika Henckel von Donnersmarck (1902–1965)
        - Baroness Lili von Goldschmidt-Rothschild (1883–1925)
          m. 1906 : Philipp Schey von Koromla (1881–1957)

== Rothschild banking family of France ==
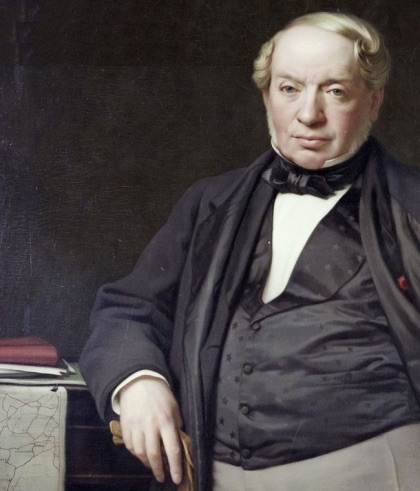
James Mayer de Rothschild

James Mayer de Rothschild, the fifth son, went to France and established de Rothschild Frères in Paris. He married Betty Salomon de Rothschild, his own niece in 1824. With her, he had five children (a daughter and four sons), four of whom married within the family.

- Mayer Amschel Rothschild (1744–1812), banker
  founder of the dynasty
  m. 1770 : Gertrude Schnapper (1753–1849)
  - James Mayer de Rothschild (1792–1868), banker and vineyard owner (Château Lafite Rothschild)
    founder of Rothschild banking family of France
    m. 1824 : Betty Salomon de Rothschild (1805–1886)
    - Charlotte de Rothschild (1825–1899)
      m. 1842 : Nathaniel de Rothschild (1812–1870), vineyard owner (Château Mouton Rothschild)
      founder of the French wine-making branch of the Rothschild family
      see § Rothschild banking family of England
    - Alphonse James de Rothschild (1827–1905), banker
      m. 1857 : Leonora von Rothschild (1837–1911)
      see § Rothschild banking family of England
      - Bettina Caroline de Rothschild (1858–1892)
        m. 1876 : Albert Salomon von Rothschild (1844–1911), banker
        see § Rothschild banking family of Austria
      - Lionel James Mayer Rothschild (1861–1861)
      - Charlotte Béatrice de Rothschild (1864–1934), socialite and art collector
        m. 1883 : Maurice Ephrussi (1849–1916), banker
        see Ephrussi family
      - Édouard Alphonse James de Rothschild (1868–1949), banker
        m. 1905 : Germaine Alice Halphen (1884–1975)
        - Édouard Alphonse Émile Lionel Rotschild (1909–2007)
        - Guy de Rothschild (1909–2007), banker and racing team owner
          - m. 1937 : Alix Schey von Koromla (1911–1982)
            - David René de Rothschild (1942–), banker
              m. 1974 Olimpia Aldobrandini (1955–)
              - Alexandre de Rothschild (1980-), banker
          - m. 1957 : Marie-Helene van Zuylen van Nyevelt (1927–1996)
            - Édouard Etienne de Rothschild (1957–), banker
              m. 1981 : Mathilde Coche de la Ferté (1952–)
              m. 1991 : Arielle Marie Malard (1963–)
        - Jacqueline Rebecca Louise de Rothschild (1911–2012), chess and tennis player
          - m. 1930 : Robert Calmann-Levy (1899–1982), publisher
          - m. 1937 : Gregor Piatigorsky (1903–1976), cellist
            - Jephta Piatigorsky (1937–)
            - Joram Piatigorsky (1940–), molecular biologist
        - Bethsabée de Rothschild (1914–1999), philanthropist
    - Gustave de Rothschild (1829–1911)
      m. 1859 : Cecile Anspach (1840–1912)
      - Octave de Rothschild (1860–1860)
      - Zoé Lucie Betty de Rothschild (1863–1916)
        m. 1882 : Léon Lambert (1851–1919), banker
      - Aline Caroline de Rothschild (1867–1909)
      - Bertha Juliette de Rothschild (1870–1896)
      - André de Rothschild (1874–1877)
      - Robert de Rothschild (1880–1946)
        m. 1907 : Gabrielle Beer (1886–1945)
        - Diane de Rothschild (1907–1996)
          m. 1932–1952 : Anatole Mühlstein (1889–1957)
          - Nathalie Josso (1934–2022)
          - Anka Muhlstein (1935–)
        - Alain de Rothschild (1910–1982)
          m. 1938 : Mary Chauvin de Treuil (1916)
          - Éric de Rothschild (1940–), banker and vineyard owner (Château Lafite Rothschild)
            m. 1983 : Maria Beatrice Caracciolo di Forino (1955)
            - Saskia de Rothschild (1987-), journalist, CEO and Chairwoman of Château Lafite Rothschild
        - Élie de Rothschild (1917–2007), banker and vineyard owner (Château Lafite Rothschild)
          m. 1942 : Liliane Fould-Springer (1916–2003)
          - Nathaniel de Rothschild (1946–), banker
            m. 1975 : Nili Limon (1951)
            - Raphael de Rothschild (1976–2000)
            - Esther de Rothschild (1979–)
    - Salomon James de Rothschild (1835–1864), banker
      m. 1862 : Adelheid von Rothschild (1843–1922)
      see § Rothschild banking family of Naples
      - Hélène de Rothschild (1863–1947)
        m. 1887 : Étienne van Zuylen van Nyevelt (1860–1934)
        - Egmont van Zuylen van Nyevelt (1890–1960)
          m. 1927 : Marguerite Marie Namétalla (1907–1996)
          - Marie-Hélène van Zuylen van Nyevelt (1927–1996)
            m. (2) 1957 : Guy de Rothschild (1909–2007), banker and racing team owner
          - Thierry van Zuylen van Nyevelt van de Haar (1932–2011), horse breeder
    - Edmond James de Rothschild (1845–1934), banker
      m. 1877 : Adelheid von Rothschild (1853–1935)
      see § Rothschild banking family of Naples
      - James Armand de Rothschild (1878–1957)
        m. 1913 : Dorothy Mathilde de Rothschild (1895–1988)
      - Maurice de Rothschild (1881–1957)
        m. 1909 : Noemie Halphen (1888–1968)
        - Edmond Adolphe de Rothschild (1926–1997), banker and vineyard owner (Château Clarke)
          founder of Edmond de Rothschild Group
          m. (2) 1963 : Nadine Lhopitalier (1932), actress
          - Benjamin de Rothschild (1963–2021), banker and vineyard owner (Château Clarke)
            President of Edmond de Rothschild Group
            m. 1999 : Ariane Langner (1965–) CEO of Edmond de Rothschild Group
