= Jean-Claude Meyer =

French business banker (1945–2026)

- Born: 16 June 1945; Neuilly-sur-Seine, France
- Died: 12 June 2026 (aged 80); Paris, France
- Education: HEC Paris; Sciences Po; Paris Dauphine University
- Occupation: Business banker

Jean-Claude Meyer (French: [ʒˈɑ̃-klˈod mɛjˈe]; 16 June 1945 – 12 June 2026) was a French business banker.

After his studies at HEC Paris, Paris Dauphine University, and the Sciences Po, he became a managing partner at Rothschild & Cie and helped launch Banque Rothschild alongside David René de Rothschild and Édouard de Rothschild. He was also an advisor for the creation of the European Aeronautic Defence and Space Company in 2000. In 2012, he was nominated as a Commander of the Legion of Honour.

Meyer died in Paris on 12 June 2026, at the age of 80.
