= Edouard de Rothschild =

Édouard de Rothschild may refer to:

- Édouard Alphonse de Rothschild (1868–1949), French banker
- Édouard Etienne de Rothschild (b. 1957), French financier & horseman
