= Banque Rothschild =

Former French bank

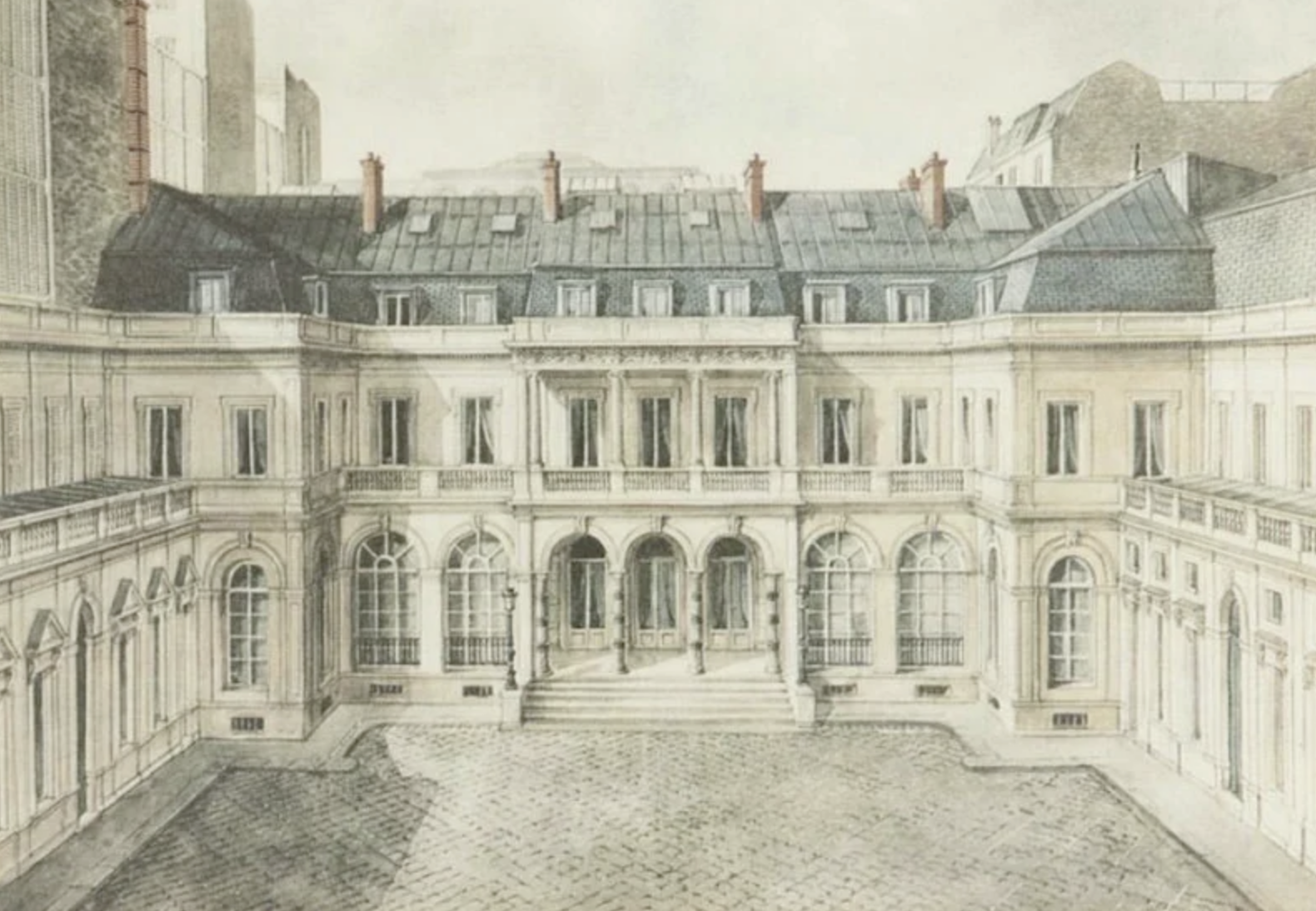
The former seat of the Banque Rothschild on rue Laffitte in Paris, demolished in 1969

The Banque Rothschild, formally known as de Rothschild Frères (lit. 'Rothschild Brothers') until 1967, was the family-controlled bank of the Rothschild banking family of France. It was established in 1817, expropriated by Vichy France in 1940, returned to the Rothschilds after the liberation of France in 1944, and nationalized in 1982 after which it operated under the name of its subsidiary Compagnie Européenne de Banque (lit. 'European Banking Company') and was eventually sold in 1991 to Barclays. It played a major role in French financial development in the 19th century, and remained significant for much of the 20th century.

== History ==
Jacob Mayer Rothschild, the youngest son of Mayer Amschel Rothschild, settled in Paris in 1812 where his name Jacob was translated to James. In 1817, he formally created the bank MM. Rothschild Frères, whose partners were himself and his brothers Amschel of Frankfurt, Carl of Naples, Nathan of London and Salomon of Vienna. In 1822 the five brothers were awarded the hereditary title of Baron by Emperor Francis I of Austria, after which James used the nobility particle "de" before his name, and the bank was subsequently known formally as de Rothschild Frères.

The Banque Rothschild was very active in lending to governments. Following the independence of Belgium, it financed Leopold I of Belgium. Following the July Revolution of 1830 that saw Louis-Philippe come to power in France, James de Rothschild put together the loan package to stabilize the finances of the new government and a second loan in 1834. In recognition of his services to the nation, King Louis-Philippe elevated James to a Grand Officer of the Legion of Honor. Following the Franco-Prussian War, in 1871–1872 the bank put together a syndicate that raised the five billion francs the country was obliged to pay Prussia under the terms of Armistice of Versailles.

The Banque Rothschild then expanded its investment banking activities. In partnership with N M Rothschild & Sons of England, it owned the Chemin de Fer du Nord railway in France that ran from their major hub, the Gare du Nord in Paris, to the English Channel and Belgium. By the later part of the 19th century, the bank was heavily involved in oil exploration in the Baku area of present-day Azerbaijan through their company, the Caspian and Black Sea Oil Industry and Trade Society established in 1883, an investment that proved to be highly lucrative. In 1898, the Rothschilds established the Mazut Transportation Society that developed a fleet of oil tankers operating in the Caspian Sea. In 1911, the Royal Dutch Shell company purchased the Rothschilds' Azerbaijan oil fields. In 1873 de Rothschild Frères in France and N M Rothschild & Sons of London joined with other investors to acquire the Spanish government's money-losing Rio Tinto copper mines. The new owners restructured the company and turned it into a profitable business. By 1905, the Rothschild interest in Rio Tinto amounted to more than 30 percent. In 1887, the French and English Rothschild banking houses lent money to, and invested in, the De Beers diamond mines in South Africa, becoming its largest shareholders. In the 1930s, however, the bank's vast railroad holdings were nationalized.

The bank's growth was spectacular and near-continuous. According to the bank's records, in 1815 the capital of the Paris banking house James Mayer de Rothschild founded amounted to £55,000 (equivalent to £5.1 million in 2024); by 1852 the figure was £3,541,700 (equivalent to £562.6 million in 2024), and in 1878, just ten years after his death, £16,914,000 (equivalent to £2.35 billion in 2024).

After James, the Banque Rothschild was run by his sons Alphonse (d. 1905), Gustave (d. 1911) then Edmond (d. 1934) together with Alphonse 's son Edouard. James de Rothschild had stipulated "that the three branches of the family descended from him always be represented." For the next seven decades that was the case but in 1939, Edouard and his cousin Robert de Rothschild (son of Gustave), experiencing friction with their other cousin Maurice de Rothschild (son of Edmond), bought out the latter's share. Maurice went on to be enormously successful and, having inherited a fortune from the childless Adolph Carl von Rothschild of the Naples branch of the family, moved to Geneva, Switzerland, thus establishing a new Swiss branch of the family.

In 1940, the Nazi occupiers forced the Rothschilds to sell the bank together with their other French properties. It was returned to the Rothschild family following the Liberation of France.

In 1949, Guy de Rothschild took over the bank's leadership following Edouard de Rothschild's death. In 1953, future President of France, Georges Pompidou, joined de Rothschild Frères and from 1956 to 1962 served as its general manager. In 1962, the bank created Imétal (later renamed Imerys), an umbrella company for their extensive mining ventures. Headed by Guy de Rothschild, Imétal looked outward, investing in Great Britain and the United States, a move that put him on the December 20, 1963 cover of Time magazine.

Following France's 1966 banking reform, on 1 January 1968 the partnership de Rothschild Frères was re-organized as Banque Rothschild, a limited-liability company.

By 1980, the Paris business employed about 2,000 people and had an annual turnover of 26 billion francs ($5 billion in the currency rates of 1980).

== Nationalization and aftermath ==
In 1982, the recently elected Socialist government of François Mitterrand nationalized the Banque Rothschild, paying 150 million French francs to the Rothschild family, and rebranded it Compagnie Européenne de Banque, the name of a former mortgage subsidiary. That bank was privatized in 1991 and acquired by Barclays.

In 1987, David de Rothschild and his half-brother Edouard de Rothschild renamed Paris Orléans, a family-controlled holding company that had escaped the nationalization, into Rothschild & Cie Banque. They were joined by their cousin Eric de Rothschild. In 2003, following the retirement of Evelyn de Rothschild as head of N M Rothschild & Sons of London, the English and French firms merged into Rothschild & Co under the leadership of David de Rothschild.

== Head office ==
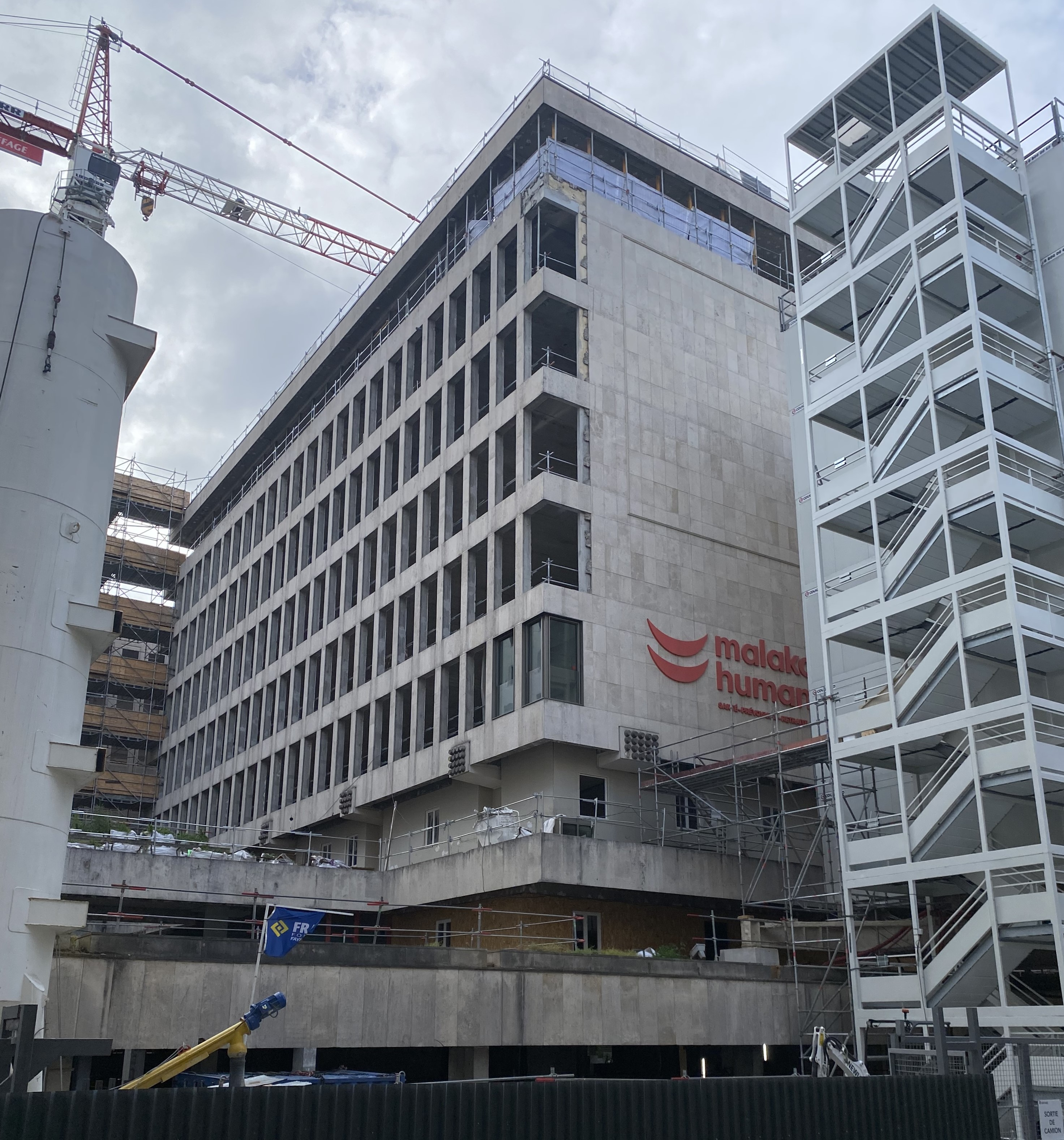
The bank's head office as reconstructed in the late 1960s, under renovation in 2024

In 1818, James Rothschild purchased the former hôtel particulier of 18th-century financier Jean Joseph de Laborde, on rue d'Artois in Paris (No. 19-21). That property had been owned by Joseph Fouché, and purchased from him by Count Moritz von Fries and a Prague-based partner; Fouché still had briefly lived there during the Hundred Days in 1815. To its south lied the Hôtel de la reine Hortense, and to its north the mansion of Anne Jean Marie René Savary, both of which would later be absorbed into the Rothschild compound. Further north (No. 27) lied the mansion of banker Jacques Laffitte, after whom the street was renamed in 1830 (during his lifetime) as rue Laffitte.

In 1836, James de Rothschild had his property remodeled by designers Duponchel and Bellenger. In 1838, he purchased the storied Hôtel Saint-Florentin in the Rue Saint-Florentin and moved there, but the bank remained on rue Laffitte, so that the street's name later became a metonymy for the Banque Rothschild.

In 1969, as the bank was expanding into new lines of business, the Rothschilds demolished the historic building and replace it with a modernist office building designed by prominent French architect Pierre Dufau together with American Max Abramovitz, and inaugurated in early 1970. That building has been more recently used as headquarters by Malakoff Humanis, a health care services and pensions group.

== See also ==
- Rothschild family
- Pereire brothers
- List of banks in France
