= David de Rothschild =

David de Rothschild may refer to Rothschild family members:

- David René de Rothschild (born 1942), French banker, head of Group Rothschild
- David Mayer de Rothschild (born 1978), British adventurer and environmentalist
