= Rothschild banking family of France =

French banking family

Arms of the Rothschild family

The Rothschild banking family of France (French: Famille banquière Rothschild) is the French branch of the Rothschild family. It was founded in 1812 by James Mayer de Rothschild (1792–1868) in Paris, which was then part of the First French Empire. He was sent there from his home in Frankfurt by his father, Mayer Amschel Rothschild (1744–1812). Wanting his sons to succeed on their own and to expand the family business across Europe, Mayer Amschel Rothschild had his eldest son remain in Frankfurt, while his four other sons were sent to different European cities to establish a financial institution to invest in business and provide banking services. Endogamy within the family was an essential part of the Rothschild strategy in order to ensure control of their wealth remained in family hands.

== Involvement in finance and industry ==
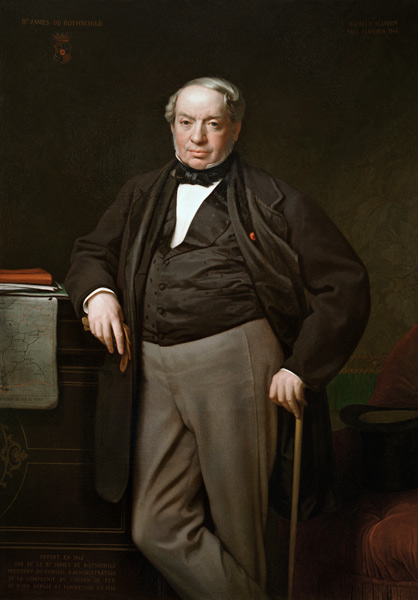
James Mayer de Rothschild, the founder of the French branch of the Rothschild banking dynasty.

Through their collaborative efforts, the Rothschilds rose to prominence in a variety of banking endeavors including loans, government bonds and trading in bullion. Their financing afforded investment opportunities and during the 19th century, they became major stakeholders in large-scale mining and rail transport ventures that were fundamental to the rapidly expanding industrial economies of Europe, as well as wine growing and the oil industry.

The French Revolution in 1789 brought positive changes for French Jews, resulting in their full emancipation in 1791. In 1806, Napoleon I ordered the convening of a "Grand Sanhedrin" in Paris and in 1808 he organized the "Consistoire central des Israélites de France", the administrative agency for all French Jews. The consistorial system made Judaism a recognized religion and placed it under government control. This Consistoire has been a functioning body ever since, except under the Nazi occupation of France during World War II. By tradition, the Central Consistoire has had a member of the Rothschild family as its president.

Jacob Mayer Rothschild, the youngest son, settled in Paris in 1812 where his name Jacob was translated to James. In 1817, he formally created the bank, de Rothschild Frères whose partners were brothers Amschel of Germany, James of France, Carl of Naples, Nathan of England and Salomon of Austria. Highly successful as lenders and investors, the Paris operation also became bankers for Leopold I of Belgium. In 1822 the influential James and his four brothers were awarded the hereditary title of "Baron" by Emperor Francis I of Austria.

Following the July Revolution of 1830 that saw Louis-Philippe come to power in France, James de Rothschild put together the loan package to stabilize the finances of the new government and a second loan in 1834. In recognition of his services to the nation, King Louis-Philippe elevated James to a Grand Officer of the Legion of Honor.

There is a theory that before Louis-Phillipe came to power the Rothschilds were fronting for the House of Orleans. A major portion of the business has consisted of selling French government bonds to French investors through London to protect their anonymity. There was a general perception on the part of the French that otherwise their government might unilaterally reset terms. No French fortune was more likely to face the problem than the younger branch of the royal family. The theory follows that when the Orleanists came to power they became less provident but by then the Rothschilds had numerous other clients.

The de Rothschild Frères banking business was passed down to ensuing generations. James Mayer de Rothschild had stipulated "that the three branches of the family descended from him always be represented." For the next two generations that was the case but in 1939, Edouard Alphonse de Rothschild and cousin Robert-Philippe-Gustave de Rothschild, incompatible with their other cousin Maurice de Rothschild, bought out his share. Maurice went on to be enormously successful and, having inherited a fortune from the childless Adolph Carl von Rothschild of the Naples branch of the family, he moved to Geneva, Switzerland and perpetuated the new Swiss branch of the family.

The French Rothschild family's business suffered a near death blow in 1981 when the Socialist government of François Mitterrand nationalized and renamed it Compagnie Européenne de Banque. In 1987 a successor company called Rothschild & Cie Banque was created by David René de Rothschild who was joined by his half-brother Edouard de Rothschild and cousin Eric de Rothschild. Capitalized at only $1 million and starting with just three employees, they soon built their tiny investment bank into a major competitor in France and continental Europe. In 2003, following the retirement of Sir Evelyn de Rothschild as head of N M Rothschild & Sons of London, the English and French firms merged into the Group Rothschild under the leadership of David René de Rothschild. In 2006, the French banking division expanded into Brussels, Belgium.

== Struggles for the French Rothschilds ==
In the 1930s, the vast railroad holdings of French Rothschilds were nationalized. The Fall of France greatly affected the French Rothschilds as their bank was seized by the Nazi occupiers. Despite having the bank restored to them at the end of the war, the family bank Rothschild Freres would be nationalized in 1981 by the socialist government of then newly elected French President François Mitterrand.

== The French Rothschilds today ==
Both the British and the French branches emerged from the Second World War with new generations of the family at the helm. Historic partnership ties between the two branches were revitalized, leading to a complete merger in 2003 into Rothschild & Co.

The Rothschilds created their first hedge funds in 1969, and strengthened its position as a world leader in investment banking. Additionally, the firm is a global private bank with over 4,000 private clients in 90 countries. Rothschild & Co provides a comprehensive range of services to individuals, governments, and corporations worldwide.

== Involvement in wine growing ==
The second French branch was founded by Nathaniel de Rothschild (1812–1870). Born in London, he was the fourth child of the founder of the British branch of the family, Nathan Mayer Rothschild (1777–1836). In 1842, he married Charlotte de Rothschild (1825–1899), daughter of James Mayer de Rothschild and in 1850, they moved to Paris, where he was to work for his father-in-law's bank. However, in 1853 Nathaniel acquired Château Brane Mouton, a vineyard in Pauillac in the Gironde département. Nathaniel Rothschild renamed the estate Château Mouton Rothschild: it would become one of the best-known wine labels in the world.

In 1868, Nathaniel's uncle/father-in-law, James Mayer de Rothschild, acquired the prestigious neighboring vineyard, Château Lafite.

== Philanthropy ==
The French Rothschilds and members of the other branches in Europe were all major contributors to causes in aid of the Jewish people. However, many of their philanthropic efforts extended far beyond Jewish ethnic or religious communities. They built hospitals and shelters, supported cultural institutions and were patrons of individual artists. At present, a research project is underway by The Rothschild Archive in London to document the family's philanthropic involvements.

== Family members ==
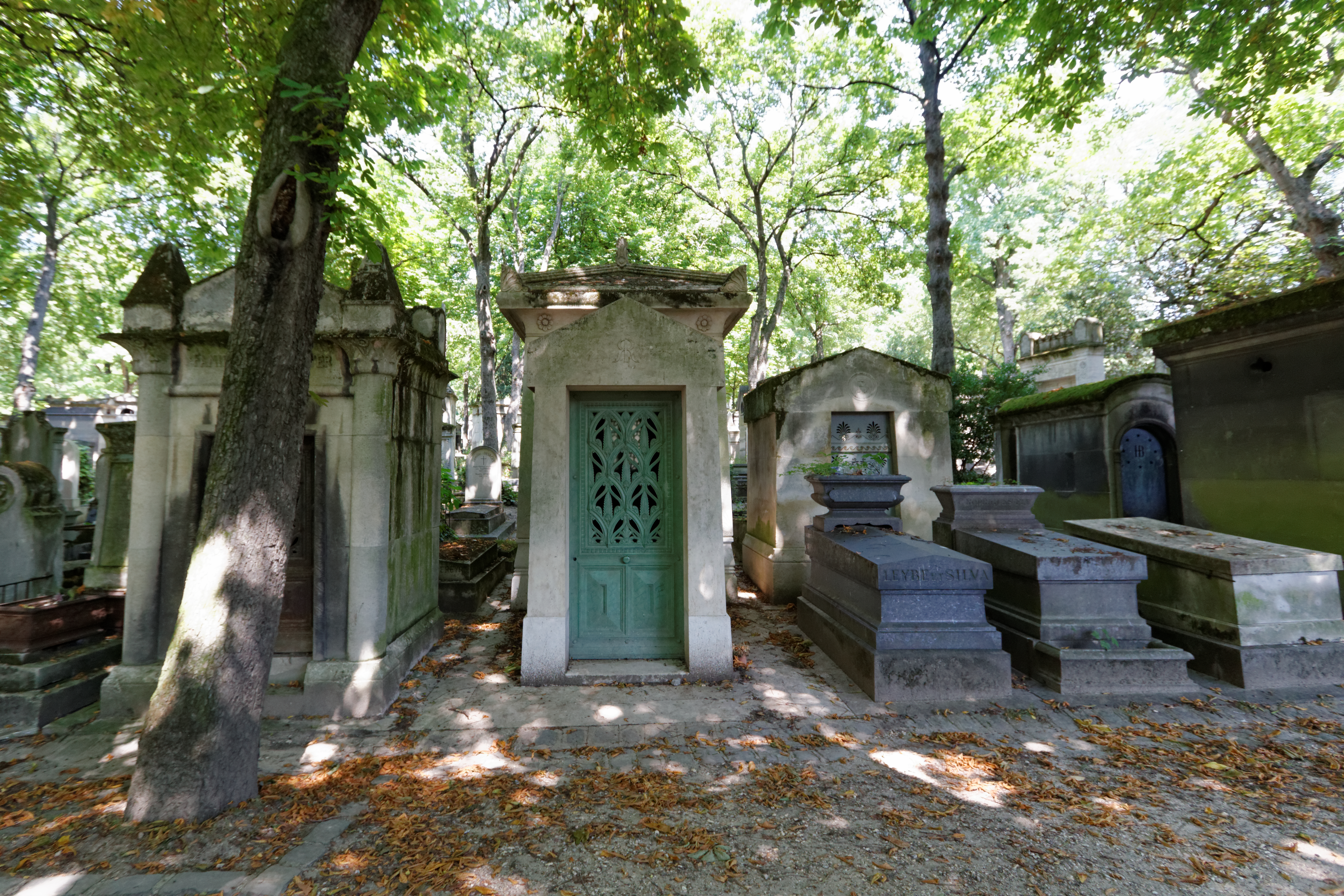
Rothschild family mausoleum at the Père Lachaise Cemetery in Paris

Notable Rothschild family members in France include:

- Alphonse James de Rothschild (1827–1905)
- Aline Caroline de Rothschild (1865–1909)
- Ariane de Rothschild (b. 1965)
- Arthur de Rothschild (1851–1903)
- Béatrice Ephrussi de Rothschild (1864–1934)
- Benjamin de Rothschild (1963–2021)
- Charlotte de Rothschild (1825–1899)
- Bethsabée de Rothschild (1914–1999)
- David René de Rothschild (b. 1942)
- Lavinia de Rothschild
- Stéphanie de Rothschild
- Louise de Rothschild
- Alexandre de Rothschild
- Edmond Adolphe de Rothschild (1926–1997)
- Edmond James de Rothschild (1845–1934)
- Édouard Etienne de Rothschild (b. 1957)
- Edouard Alphonse de Rothschild (1868–1949)
- Elie Robert de Rothschild (1917–2007)
- Elisabeth de Rothschild (1902–1945)
- Guy de Rothschild (1909–2007)
- Hélène de Rothschild (1863–1947)
- Jacqueline Rebecca de Rothschild (1911–2012)
- James Armand de Rothschild (1878–1957)
- James Mayer de Rothschild (1792–1868)
- Marie-Hélène de Rothschild (1927–1996)
- Nadine de Rothschild (b. 1932)
- Nathaniel Robert de Rothschild (b. 1946)
- Nicole de Rothschild (1923–2007)
- Pauline de Rothschild (1908–1976)
- Philippe de Rothschild (1902–1988)
- Philippine de Rothschild (1933–2014)
- Salomon James de Rothschild (1835–1864)
- Louis Ralph Helguera von Rothschild-Haverkate (1939–2007)
- Saskia de Rothschild (b. 1987)

== Rothschild properties ==
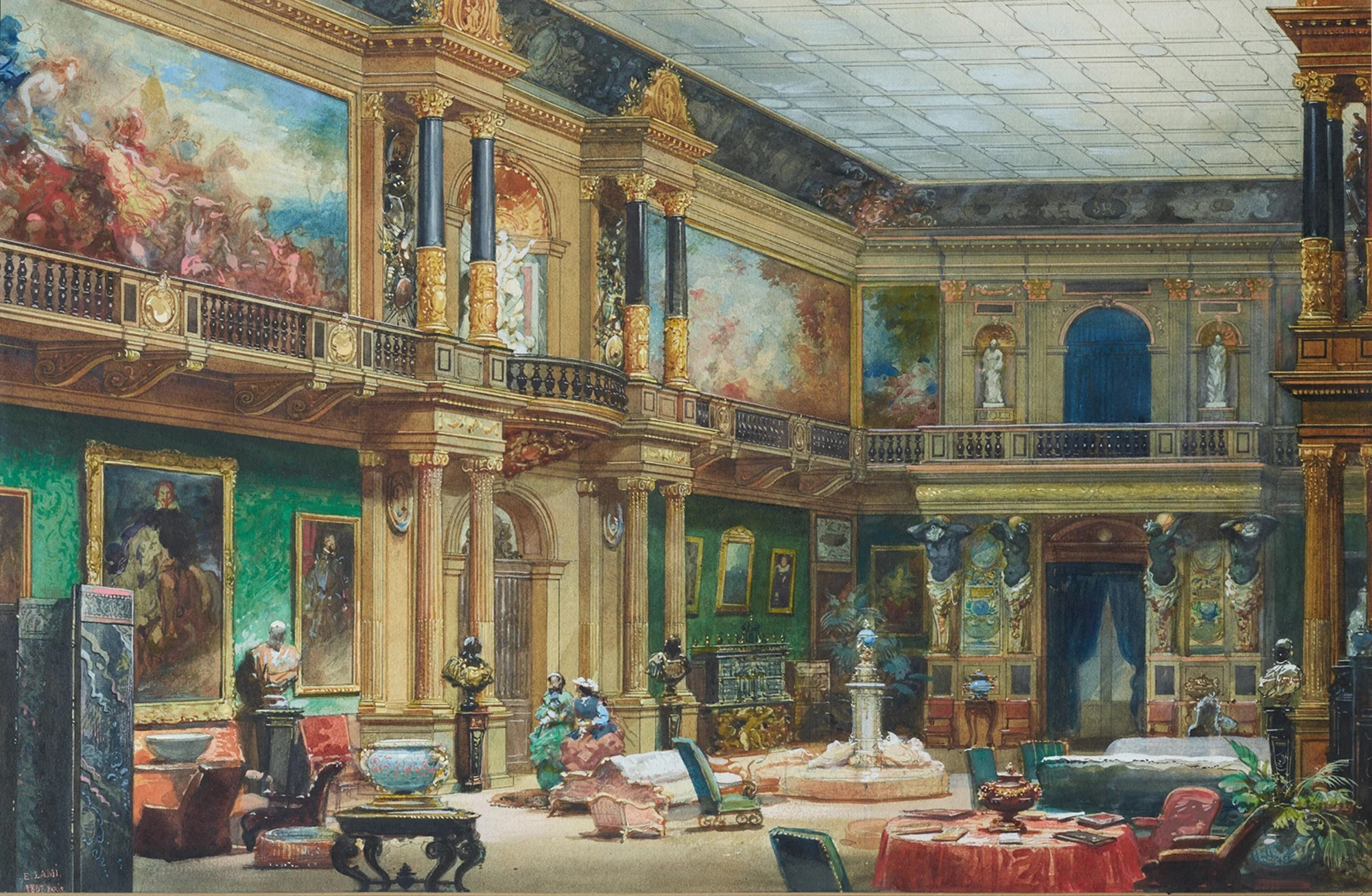
The Great Hall at the Château de Ferrières, estate of James Mayer de Rothschild

All branches of the Rothschild banking family are famous for their art collections and a number for their palatial estates. Among the Rothschild properties in France were:

- Abbaye des Vaux de Cernay - Cernay-la-Ville, Yvelines
- Château Clarke - Listrac-Médoc, Gironde
- Château de Ferrières - Ferrières-en-Brie, Seine-Maritime
- Château des Fontaines - Chantilly, Oise
- Château Lafite - Pauillac, Gironde
- Château de Laversine - Saint-Maximin, Oise
- Château des Laurets - Puisseguin, Gironde
- Château Malmaison - Moulis-en-Médoc, Gironde
- Château de Montvillargenne - Gouvieux, Oise
- Château Mouton Rothschild - Pauillac, Gironde
- Château de la Muette - Paris, now the home of the Organisation for Economic Co-operation and Development
- Château d'Armainvilliers, Seine-et-Marne
- Château Rothschild, Boulogne-Billancourt - Boulogne-Billancourt, Hauts-de-Seine
- Haras de Meautry - Touques, Calvados
- Hôtel Lambert - Paris
- Hôtel de Marigny - Paris. Today, a Presidential residence used for State visitors.
- Hôtel de Pontalba - 41 Rue du Faubourg-Saint-Honoré, Paris. Today, the residence for the Ambassadors from the United States
- Hôtel Salomon de Rothschild - Paris
- Talleyrand Building - Paris. Today, the embassy of the United States
- Château de Vallière - Mortefontaine, Oise
- Villa Ephrussi de Rothschild - Saint-Jean-Cap-Ferrat on the Côte d'Azur
- Villa Rothschild, Cannes - Cannes on the French Riviera

== See also ==
- Rothschild family
- Rothschild banking family of Austria
- Rothschild banking family of England
- Rothschild banking family of Naples
