= Alexandre de Rothschild =

French banker and business executive

- Born: Alexandre Guy Francesco de Rothschild; December 3, 1980 (age 45); Paris, France
- Education: École supérieure du commerce extérieur (ESCE)
- Occupations: Banker; business executive
- Years active: 2008–present
- Employer: Rothschild & Co
- Title: Executive Chairman
- Spouse: Olivia Bordeaux-Groult (m. 2009)
- Children: 4
- Parent: David René de Rothschild (father)

Alexandre Guy Francesco de Rothschild (born 3 December 1980) is a French investment banker and business executive. He is the son of David de Rothschild, whom he succeeded as head of the family's investment bank. Since 2018, he has served as executive chairman of Rothschild & Co.

== Early life and education ==
Rothschild was born into the Rothschild banking family of France as the son of banker David de Rothschild. He studied at the École supérieure du commerce extérieur (ESCE), graduating with a degree in international business.

== Career ==
Rothschild began his career in 2004 as a financial analyst at Bear Stearns in New York, and later joined Bank of America. When the bank sold its private equity arm, he left with the team to help establish a new investment firm, Argan Capital, in London (2005–2008). He subsequently worked in strategy at Jardine Matheson in Hong Kong.

In 2008, he joined Rothschild & Co to assist in developing its merchant banking division, Five Arrows. He joined the group executive committee in 2011, became a managing partner of the Paris banking subsidiary Rothschild & Cie Banque (now Rothschild Martin Maurel) in 2013, and was appointed executive deputy chairman in March 2017.

In May 2018, he succeeded his father as executive chairman of Rothschild & Co (known in France as Rothschild & Cie). As of 2022, Rothschild & Co ranked among the leading global M&A advisers by number of deals, and tenth worldwide by deal value, behind mostly American banks. In 2023, the Rothschild family's holding company, Concordia, launched a €3.7 billion offer to take the Anglo-French investment group private.

In the following years, the bank expanded its international wealth management operations, including opening a new office in Dubai in 2024 and integrating the Gulf private banking business of Liechtensteinische Landesbank into its Middle East platform.

== Other roles ==
Rothschild has served as a director of Bouygues since April 2017.

== Personal life ==
In 2009, Rothschild married Olivia Bordeaux-Groult, granddaughter of Pierre Bordeaux-Groult. The couple have four children.
