= Guy de Rothschild =

French banker and member of the Rothschild family

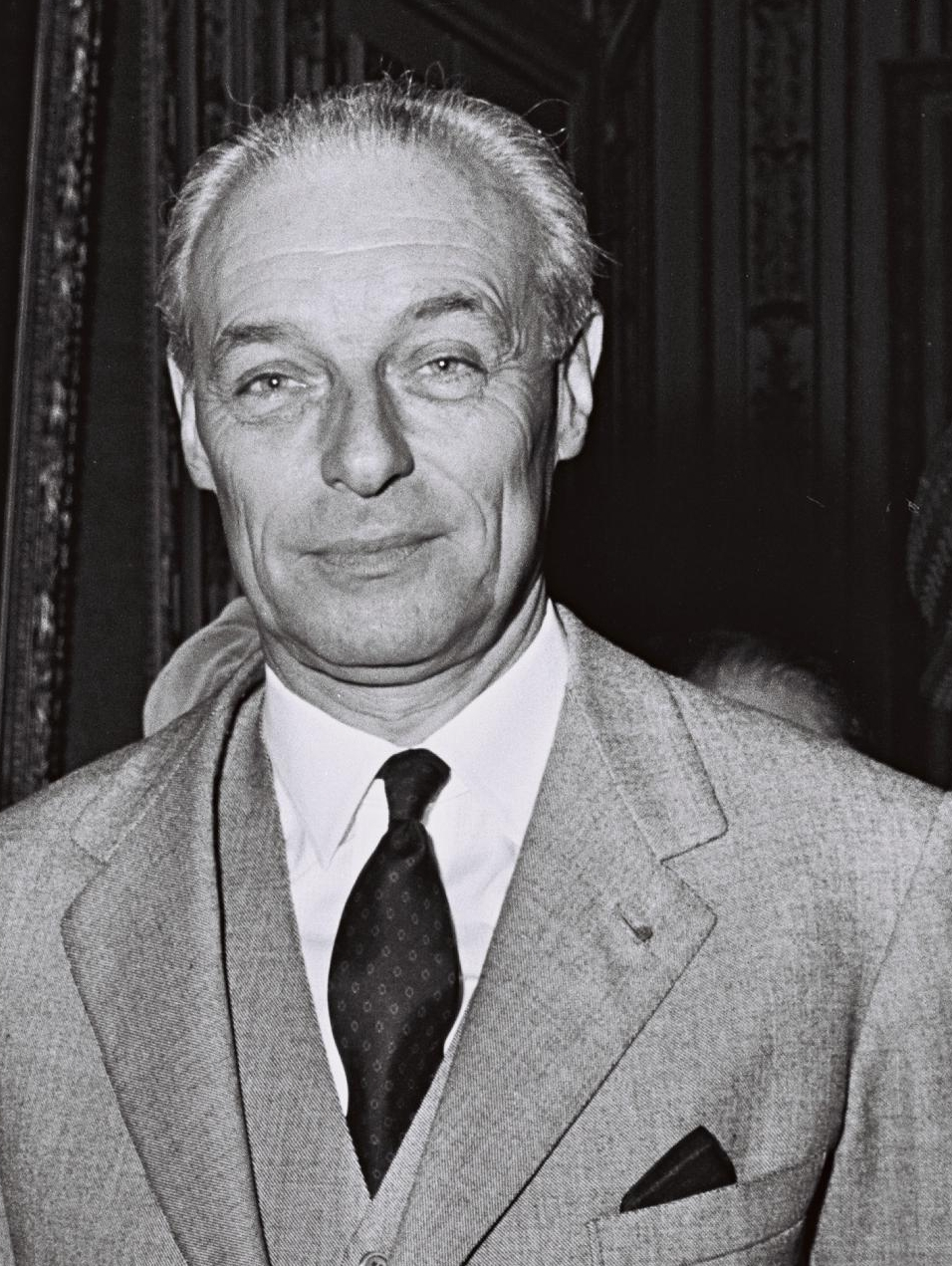
- Pictured in 1964
- Born: 21 May 1909; Paris, France
- Died: 12 June 2007 (aged 98); Paris, France
- Occupations: Soldier, financier, philanthropist, racehorse owner/breeder
- Board member of: Banque Rothschild; Banque de France; Château Lafite Rothschild; Northern Railway Company; Imetal S.A.
- Spouses: Alix Hermine Schey de Koromla (m. 1937; div. 1956) Marie-Hélène van Zuylen van Nyevelt (m. 1957; died 1996)
- Children: With Schey de Koromla: David René de Rothschild; With van Zuylen van Nyevelt: Édouard Étienne de Rothschild; Stepdaughters: Lili Krahmer; Bettina Krahmer
- Parent(s): Édouard A. J. de Rothschild; Germaine Alice Halphen
- Family: Rothschild family
- Honors: Croix de Guerre

Baron Guy Édouard Alphonse Paul de Rothschild (pronounced [baʁɔ̃ ɡi edwaːʁt‿alfɔ̃s pɔl də ʁɔt.ʃild]; 21 May 1909 – 12 June 2007) was a French banker and member of the Rothschild banking family of France. Between 1967 and 1979, he was the chairman of the French Banque Rothschild, nationalized by the French government in 1982, and maintained investments in other French and foreign companies, including Imerys. He was named to the International Best Dressed List Hall of Fame in 1985.

== Early life and education ==
Baron Guy de Rothschild was born in Paris, the son of Baron Édouard de Rothschild and his wife, the former Germaine Alice Halphen. He has three siblings. Guy's elder brother, Édouard Alphonse Émile Lionel, died at the age of four of appendicitis; he also had two younger sisters, Jacqueline and Bethsabée. Half of his great-grandparents were Rothschilds. He was a great-great grandson of the German patriarch of the Rothschild family Mayer Amschel Rothschild, who founded the family's banking in the 18th century in Frankfurt, Germany.

He grew up at his parents' townhouse on the corner of the rue de Rivoli and the Place de la Concorde in Paris (a property once occupied by Talleyrand and now the United States Embassy) and their country estate at Château de Ferrières, 25 miles east of Paris. Château de Ferrières is a massive house built to a design by Joseph Paxton in the 1850s, based on Paxton's earlier design of Mentmore Towers for Baron Mayer de Rothschild of the English branch of the Rothschild family.

He was educated at the Lycée Condorcet and Lycée Louis-le-Grand in Paris, and by private tutors. He undertook military service with the cavalry at Saumur, and played golf for France. He won the Grand Prix de Sud-Ouest in 1948.

== Personal life ==
Guy de Rothschild married twice:

- In 1937, he married a distant cousin, Baroness Alix Hermine Jeanette Schey de Koromla. Alix was the former wife of Kurt Krahmer and the younger daughter of Baron Philipp Schey von Koromla. They had one child, David René de Rothschild (born 1942). Rothschild also raised his wife's daughters from her prior marriage to Krahmer, Lili and Bettina. They divorced in 1956.
- In 1957, he married Baroness Marie-Hélène van Zuylen van Nyevelt. Marie-Hélène's first marriage to Count François de Nicolay—with whom she had one son, Philippe de Nicolay—had been dissolved in 1956. Like his first wife, she was a distant cousin, though in this case, a Roman Catholic. They had one child, Baron Édouard de Rothschild (born 1957).

After his second marriage, Guy de Rothschild renovated the Château de Ferrières, using it to put on lavish balls in the early 1970s, before donating it to the University of Paris in 1975. The same year, he bought the Hôtel Lambert on the Île Saint-Louis in Paris, the top floors of which became his Paris residence.

== Service in World War II ==
In 1940, as a result of the German occupation of France in World War II, Guy de Rothschild's parents and sister Bethsabée fled France and made their way to safety in New York City. Guy de Rothschild had enlisted in the French Army and was a company commander in the 3rd Light Mechanised Division during the Battle of France in early 1940. After fighting the Nazis at Carvin, he was part of the French Army that was forced to retreat to Dunkirk. He was awarded the Croix de Guerre for his actions on the beaches at Dunkirk, from where he was evacuated to England. He immediately returned to France, landing at Brest, and taking charge of the family's office at La Bourboule, near Clermont-Ferrand.

Under the Vichy government, his father and uncles were stripped of their French nationality, removed from the register of the Légion d'honneur, and the family was forced to sell its possessions. Rothschild managed to persuade the buyers to grant options under which he would later be able to buy the family's interests back. He left France again, via Spain and Portugal, to join his parents in New York City. He joined the Free French Forces and boarded the cargo ship, Pacific Grove, to travel back to Europe. His ship was torpedoed and sunk in March 1943, and he was rescued after spending 12 hours in the waters of the Atlantic Ocean. In England, he joined the staff of General Koenig at Supreme Headquarters Allied Expeditionary Force near Portsmouth.

== Banking and business ==
Guy de Rothschild studied law at university then joined de Rothschild Frères in 1931 when it was being run by his father and a cousin, Robert de Rothschild, who died in 1946. As part of his learning to manage the family's businesses, in 1933 he joined the executive board of their Northern Railway Company.

At the end of World War II, Guy de Rothschild returned to the bank's offices at rue Laffitte in Paris in 1944. On his father's death in 1949, Guy de Rothschild took formal control of the business. Years later, Rothschild was on the cover of the 20 December 1963 issue of Time magazine in a story that said he took "over the family's French bank during the disorder of war and defeat, changed its character from stewardship of the family fortune to expansive modern banking."

Following in the footsteps of his father, grandfather, and great-grandfather, Guy de Rothschild served as a director of the Banque de France. On his father's death, he also inherited part of Château Lafite-Rothschild but did not run it.

Georges Pompidou, who would later become President and Prime Minister of France, was recruited by Guy de Rothschild from a job as a teacher, and worked for him from 1953 to 1962, during which time he became the general manager of the Rothschild bank. The bank diversified, from investment management under De Rothschild Frères to the deposit-taking Banque Rothschild, with branches throughout France. Guy was its president from 1968 to 1978. In 1968 Guy de Rothschild became a partner at N M Rothschild & Sons, London, while cousin Sir Evelyn de Rothschild was appointed a director of Banque Rothschild, Paris.

=== Imetal S.A. ===
In France, Rothschild developed the country's largest private uranium mining company, the Compagnie Française des Minerais d'Uranium. In 1961, Guy de Rothschild took over as Chairman of Imetal S.A. in which the family had a substantial stake. His involvement marked the first time any Rothschild had personally participated in the management of the business. Among its holdings, the international mining conglomerate owned Société Le Nickel (SLN) in New Caledonia. In 1969, SLN acquired Peñarroya, a Chilean based company which mined and processed lead, zinc and copper. Two years later SLN took over La Compagnie de Mokta, which specialized in iron, manganese, sand, gravel and uranium. Rothschild restructured the family's various mining interests, including Peñarroya which became part of SLN.

=== Nationalization ===
In the early 1970s the government of France began nationalizing a number of industries and after declaring nickel to be a vital market commodity, SLN's assets were nationalized in 1974 and placed under a new company, Société Metallurgique. The result left the Rothschild's SLN as a holding company with a fifty percent interest in Société Metallurgique.

When the Rothschild's bank was nationalized in 1982 by the socialist government of François Mitterrand, a discouraged Guy de Rothschild left France and moved temporarily to New York City. "A Jew under Pétain, a pariah under Mitterrand, that's enough!" (French: Juif sous Pétain, paria sous Mitterrand, cela suffit!) he wrote in a frontpage op-ed in Le Monde in 1981. Following another change in government policy, in 1987 a new banking business was established by his son David and nephew Éric, who founded Rothschild & Cie Banque.

== Thoroughbred racing ==
Guy de Rothschild was a renowned breeder of Thoroughbreds as the family owns Haras de Meautry in Normandy. He inherited Château de Reux in the horse breeding area in Lower Normandy about 125 miles north of Paris. He produced prominent race horses, the most famous perhaps was Exbury.

Guy de Rothschild chaired the association of racehorse breeders in France from 1975 to 1982.

Among the major races Guy de Rothschild's horses won were:

- Prix de l'Arc de Triomphe – (1) – Exbury (1963)
- Grand Critérium – (4) – Dragon Blanc (1952), Le Géographe (1953), Soleil (1965), Mariacci (1974)
- Grand Prix de Paris – (4) – Vieux Manoir (1950), White Label (1964), Soleil Noir (1979), Le Nain Jaune (1982)
- Grand Prix de Saint-Cloud – (3) – Ocarina (1950), Violoncelle (1951), Exbury (1963)
- Poule d'Essai des Poulains – (3) – Guersant (1952), Cobalt (1953), Soleil (1966)
- Poule d'Essai des Pouliches – (2) – Dictaway (1955), Timandra (1960)
- Prix de Diane – (3) – Cerisoles (1957), Timandra (1960), Hermières (1961)
- Prix Ganay – (4) – Guersant (1953), Exbury (1963), Free Ride (1965), Diatome (1966)
- Prix Jacques le Marois – (3) – La Bamba (1964), Luthier (1968), Kenmare (1978)
- Prix Jean Prat – (2) – Tang (1962), Lightning (1977)
- Prix Morny – (2) – Soleil (1965), Madina (1967)
- Prix Royal-Oak – (3) – Ciel, oilé (1949), Barbieri (1964), Lady Berry (1973)
- Prix Saint-Alary – (2) – Scala (1965), Grise Mine (1984)
- Prix Vermeille – (3) – Haltilala (1966), Paysanne (1972, dead-heat), Indian Rose (1988)

== Art collector ==
The French Rothschild family had long been collectors of art beginning with James Mayer de Rothschild made the first significant acquisitions. Notable in his collection, Guy de Rothschild inherited Jan Vermeer's The Astronomer. In 1940 the Nazis confiscated it from his father and sent it to Germany. In 1945 the painting was returned to the Rothschild family and acquired by the Louvre in 1983.

== Philanthropy ==
In 1950, Guy de Rothschild became the first president of the Fonds Social Juif Unifié (FSJU) (United Jewish Welfare Fund), a federation of about 200 Jewish social, educational, and cultural associations. He headed the FSJU until 1982 at which time his son, David, assumed its leadership. The FSJU played a large part in restructuring the French Jewish community following World War II. After marrying Marie-Hélène van Zuylen de Nyevelt de Haar, a Roman Catholic, in 1957 Guy felt compelled to resign the Presidency of the Jewish Consistory, the organization created in 1905 to represent French Jewry.

In 1975, Rothschild and his wife donated the Château de Ferrières to the University of Paris.

== Death ==
Widowed in 1996, Guy de Rothschild died in 2007.

== Works ==
- The Whims of Fortune: The Memoirs of Guy de Rothschild by Guy de Rothschild. Random House (1985) ISBN 0-394-54054-9 / Contre bonne fortune (French) by Guy de Rothschild. Belfond (1983). ISBN 2-7144-1550-4, ISBN 978-2-7144-1550-9
- The relationship between business and government in France (Benjamin F. Fairless memorial lectures) by Guy de Rothschild. Carnegie-Mellon University press (1983). ASIN: B0006YDWD2
- Le fantôme de Léa: Roman (French) by Guy de Rothschild. Plon (1998). ISBN 2-259-18863-X, ISBN 978-2-259-18863-0
- Mon ombre siamoise (French) by Guy de Rothschild. Grasset (1993). ISBN 2-246-47071-4, ISBN 978-2-246-47071-7

== See also ==
- Rothschild banking family of France
