= Bethsabée de Rothschild =

French philanthropist (1914–1999)

- Native name: בת-שבע דה רוטשילד
- Born: 23 September 1914; London, England
- Died: 20 April 1999 (aged 84); Tel Aviv, Israel
- Spouse: Donald Bloomingdale (m. 1948; div. 1951)
- Father: Baron Édouard Alphonse de Rothschild
- Mother: Germaine Alice Halphen
- Education: Sorbonne; Columbia University
- Relatives: Guy de Rothschild (brother); Jacqueline de Rothschild (sister); Alphonse James de Rothschild (grandfather); James Mayer Rothschild (great-grandfather)

Baroness Bethsabée de Rothschild (assumed the name Batsheva; Hebrew: בת-שבע דה רוטשילד; after she immigrated to Israel in 1951; 23 September 1914 – 20 April 1999) was a philanthropist, dance patron, and member of the Rothschild banking family.

== Early life and education ==
Bethsabée de Rothschild was a great-granddaughter of James Mayer Rothschild (1792–1868) and the fourth and youngest child of Baron Édouard Alphonse de Rothschild (1868–1949) and his wife, the former Germaine Alice Halphen (1884–1975). Her father ran the French bank with his cousin Baron Robert Philippe de Rothschild (1880–1946). Bethsabée grew up at Château de Ferrières outside of Paris, and at the Talleyrand palace, in Paris itself. Her elder brother, Édouard Alphonse Émile Lionel (1906–1911), died at the age of four of appendicitis; she also had a brother, Guy and a sister, Jacqueline. She was educated at the Sorbonne in Paris and received her bachelor's degree in biology. Following the invasion of France in 1940, she fled with her family to New York City, where she studied biochemistry and biology at Columbia University, but never received an advanced degree.

Though born to a wealthy and influential family, Bethsabée was said to have detested the rich lifestyle and distanced herself from her family, with the exception of her sister Jacqueline, with whom Bethsabée appeared to have been close and her brother Guy. She was said to have been a modest and generous woman.

=== World War II ===
During World War II, she enlisted in the Free French forces and was part of the landing force for the Battle of Normandy. She moved with the army to liberate Paris, where she served as a liaison between the French and United States military forces. At war's end, she returned to New York and enrolled at the Martha Graham dance school.

== Dance companies ==
In 1951, not long after her divorce from Bloomingdale, Rothschild traveled to Israel for the first time, settling there permanently in 1962. In Israel Rothschild made significant contributions to dance through the establishment of the Batsheva Dance Company that became one of the most influential cultural role models in Israel. In the mid-1960s, she met the South African-born classical dancer, Jeannette Ordman, who had come to Israel in 1965 from London, England; the two women were professional partners until Rothschild's death. With Rothschild's financial backing, they formed a dance school and a few years later the Bat-Dor Dance Company, with Ordman as the company's artistic director.

In addition to her cultural activities, Bethsabée de Rothschild created two foundations to advance science and technology in Israel in connection with which she was awarded the Israel Prize in 1989, for special contribution to society and to the State of Israel.

== Personal life ==
In 1948, Bethsabée de Rothschild married Donald Bloomingdale (1913–1954), the son of Irving Bloomingdale and the grandson of Lyman G. Bloomingdale, co-founder of the Bloomingdale department store. At the time of their wedding, Bloomingdale was the attache of the Paris Embassy to the United States under Jefferson Caffery. The marriage was short-lived. It is purported that she had a child that died, though seemingly not from her marriage with Bloomingdale. Her brother Guy reports this event in his memoirs, but fails to list any vital information about the child. This birth and untimely death appears to be the only such listing in the Rothschild family tree for which no identifying information is given.

Rothschild died at her home in Tel Aviv in 1999 after a lengthy illness and was buried in Israel.

=== Art collection ===
Through a trust, she had inherited part of a major art collection assembled by her grandfather Baron Alphonse James de Rothschild. This included a 17th-century oil painting by Rembrandt and other Old Master paintings as well as Islamic and Venetian glass, decorative objects and porcelain, and Renaissance-style jewelry. Following her death, the collections were auctioned off. Rembrandt's "Portrait of a Lady" was sold by Christie's in London to the Dutch art dealer Robert Noortman for a record price of US$28.7 million. A 13th-century Mamluk jug in pristine condition sold for £3,307,750 (US$4.8 million), a world record for Islamic glass, and two mosque lamps for £1,763,750 and £641,750.

== See also ==
- List of Israel Prize recipients
