= Hôtel Saint-Florentin =

- Hôtel Saint-Florentin (French)
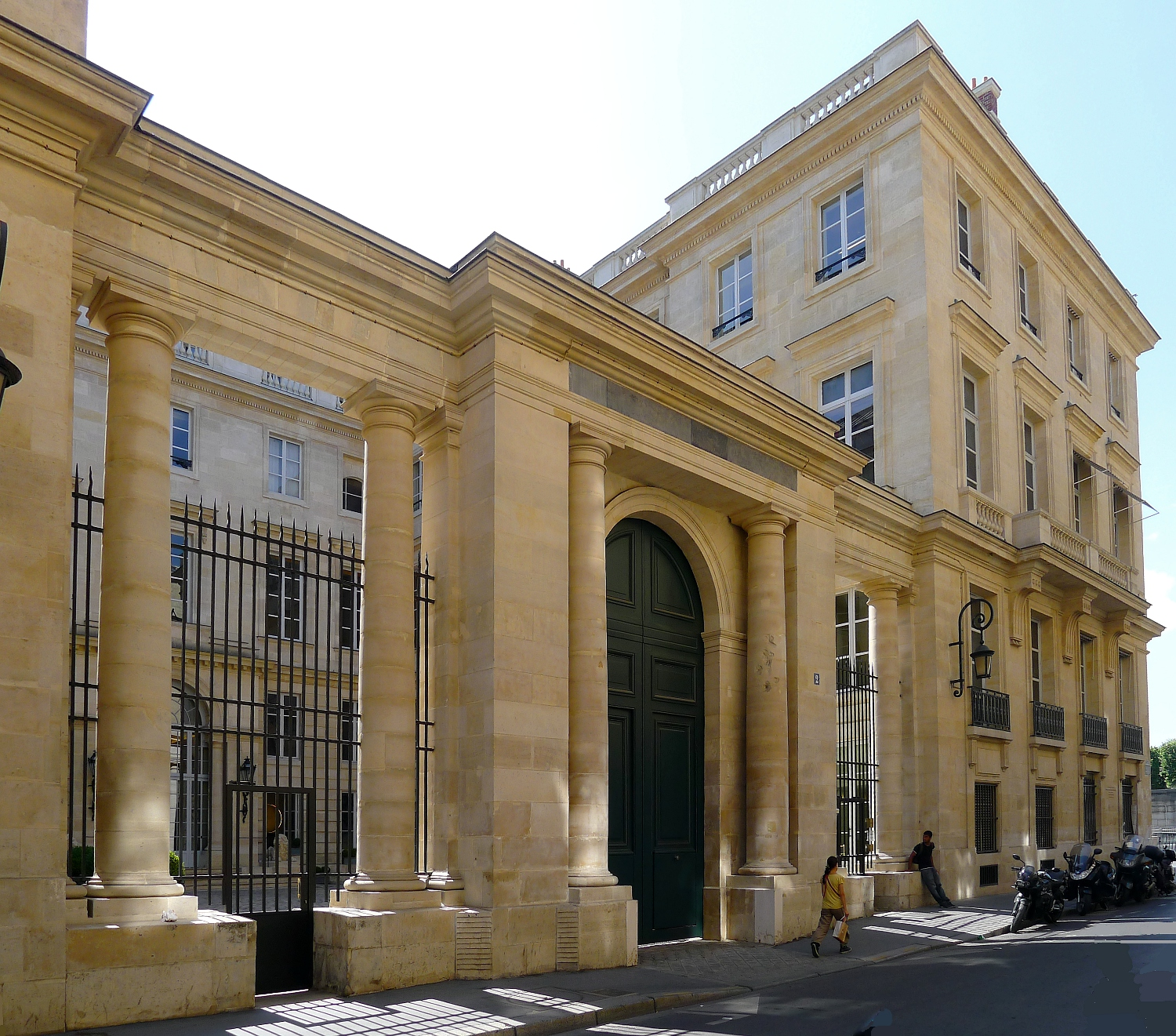
- Interactive map of Hôtel Saint-Florentin
- 48.86670°N 2.32404°E
- Location: 1st arrondissement, Paris, France

Site notes
- Architect: Jean-François Chalgrin
- Architectural style: Neoclassical
- Owner: United States government

Monument historique
- Type: Inscrit
- Designated: 12 February 1925

The Hôtel Saint-Florentin is hôtel particulier located at No. 2, rue Saint-Florentin, in the 1st arrondissement of Paris, France. Owned by the United States federal government, it houses the George C. Marshall Center and, since 2008, the American law firm Jones Day.

== History ==
The hotel is part of a vast architectural plan conceived by architect Ange-Jacques Gabriel, intended for the development of what was then the Place Louis XV.

== Protection ==
The hotel has been designated as a monument historique since February 12, 1925, and is classified as a Culturally Significant Property by the United States Department of Education.
