= Rothschild Martin Maurel =

French private bank

Rothschild & Co Martin Maurel (Rothschild Martin Maurel)
- Formerly: Compagnie Financiere Martin-Maurel SA
- Company type: Subsidiary
- Industry: Financial services
- Founded: 1825; 201 years ago (as Banque Martin Frères)
- Headquarters: 29, Av. de Messine, Paris, France
- Key people: Bernard Maurel; Lucie Maurel-Aubert; David René de Rothschild (director)
- Products: Private Banking
- Parent: Rothschild & Co (2017–present); Martin Maurel (1964–2017); Banque Maurel (1929–1964)
- Website: www.rothschildandco.com

Rothschild Martin Maurel (formerly Banque Martin Maurel) is a French private bank headquartered in Paris, with a significant presence in France, Belgium, Monaco and Luxembourg. Its origins date back to 1825.

== History ==
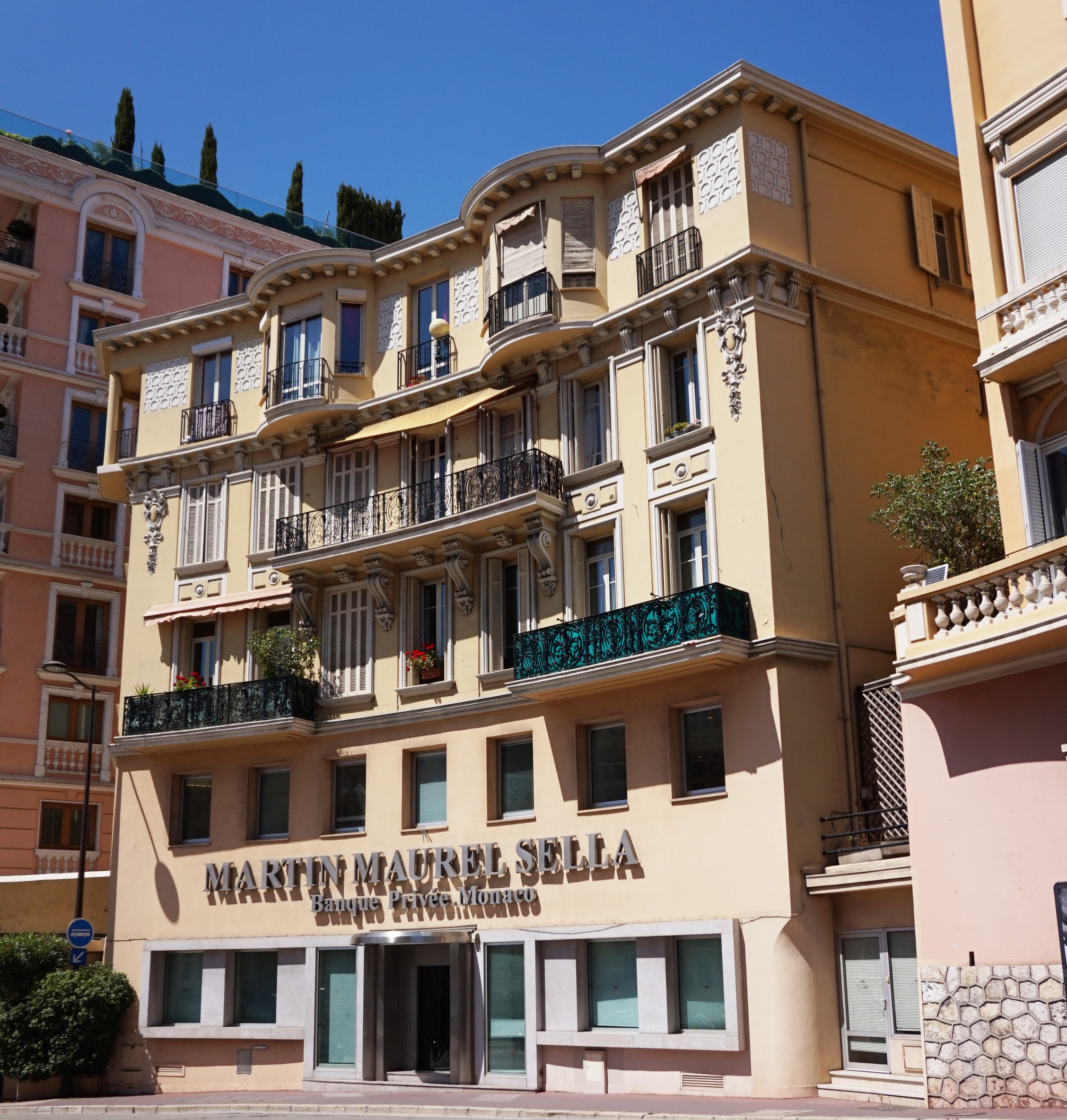
Martin Maurel Sella, a Monaco private banking subsidiary

=== Early history ===
The Banque Martin Maurel was established in 1964 as a result of a merger of Banque Martin Frères (founded in 1825) and Banque Maurel (founded in 1929) by Robert Maurel. At the time, the bank became a subsidiary of the holding company Compagnie Financière Martin Maurel Société Anonyme.

In 2000, Martin Maurel co-founded the Martin Maurel Sella Banque Privée – Monaco S.A.M. with the Italian Banca Sella Group which as of 2011 held over 1.8 billion Euros in assets. This is in addition to the existing Monaco operations, which have dated back to 1987.

=== Acquisition by Rothschild & Co ===
In June 2016, Rothschild & Co announced plans to acquire Banque Martin Maurel for €240 million ($270 million). At the time Martin Maurel had €10 billion of assets under management in France, most of which part of its private banking business. As a result, Rothschild Matin Maurel became leading independent private bank in France, with combined AUM of €34 billion.

By 2 January 2017, the merger between Banque Martin Maurel and Rothschild & Cie Banque was complete, creating Rothschild Martin Maurel.

=== Current Operations ===
The bank is headquartered at 29 Avenue de Messine in Paris; however, its main office is at another address in Marseille. The bank has branches in Paris, Marseille, Aix-en-Provence, Lyon, Brussels, Neuilly-sur-Seine, and Monaco.

It is a member of the Groupement Européen de Banques.
