= Alphonse James de Rothschild =

French financier, vineyard owner, collector, philanthropist and racehorse owner/breeder

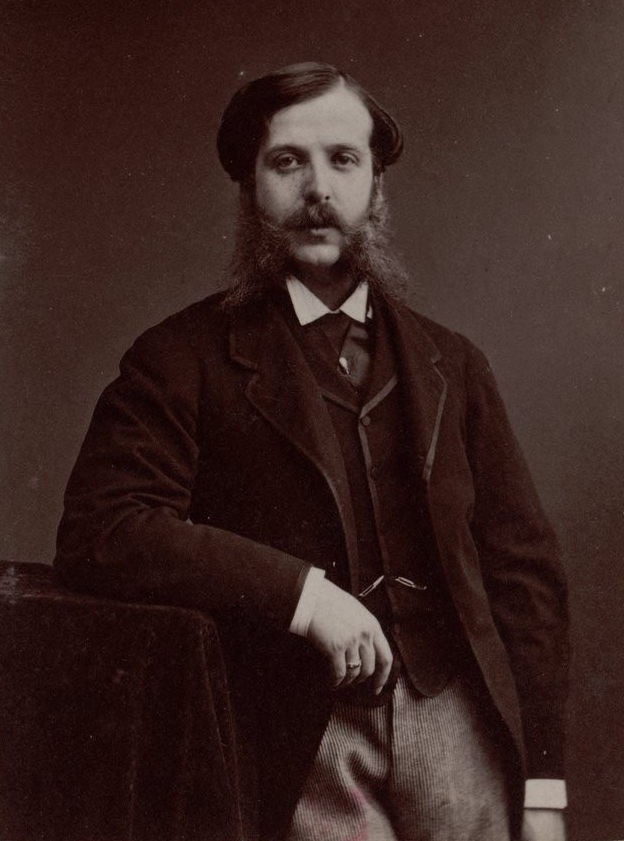
- Born: 1 February 1827; Paris, France
- Died: 26 May 1905 (aged 78); Paris, France
- Occupations: Financier, vineyard owner, philanthropist, art collector, racehorse owner/breeder
- Board member of: de Rothschild Frères, Banque de France, Château Lafite Rothschild, Société Le Nickel
- Spouse: Leonora de Rothschild (1837–1911)
- Children: 4, including Charlotte Béatrice and Édouard Alphonse James
- Parent(s): James Mayer de Rothschild and Betty de Rothschild
- Family: Rothschild family
- Awards: Grand Cross, Legion of Honor

Mayer Alphonse James Rothschild (1 February 1827 – 26 May 1905), was a French financier, vineyard owner, art collector, philanthropist, racehorse owner/breeder and a member of the Rothschild banking family of France.

== Biography ==
Known as Alphonse, he was the eldest son of James Mayer de Rothschild. His mother was Betty de Rothschild, the daughter of Salomon Mayer von Rothschild from the Austrian branch of the family. Alphonse was educated to take his place at the head of France's de Rothschild Frères bank, training in the other Rothschild banking houses in Europe. In France he soon became a major force in the financial world and in 1855 was appointed a regent of the Banque de France, a position he held for the remainder of his life.

In 1857 Alphonse de Rothschild married his niece, Leonora "Laure" de Rothschild, the daughter of Lionel de Rothschild of the English branch of the family. They had four children. Their firstborn, Bettina Caroline (1858–1892), married Albert Salomon von Rothschild.

== As a vineyard operator ==
Alphonse and his brother Gustave developed somewhat of a rivalry with their English cousin Nathaniel de Rothschild who had moved to Paris after marrying their sister Charlotte. Nathaniel worked at de Rothschild Frères bank and in 1853 he purchased the Château Brane Mouton vineyard in Pauillac in the Médoc wine growing region. Nathaniel's Mouton vineyard received a second-growth ranking in the Bordeaux Wine Official Classification of 1855. Just three months before their father died in 1868, Alphonse and Gustave convinced him to buy the more prestigious First Growth Château Lafite vineyard in Pauillac when it came up for sale.

On the death of their father in 1868, Alphonse and Gustave inherited the Château Lafite-Rothschild vineyard. However, they lived in Paris and the vineyard was not significant relative to their massive investments in banking and other business ventures. As such, they only visited the Pauillac vineyard occasionally, maintaining little more than an arms-length interest. On their deaths, the Rothschild brothers willed the property to a son and it remains in family hands to this day.

== As financier and investor ==
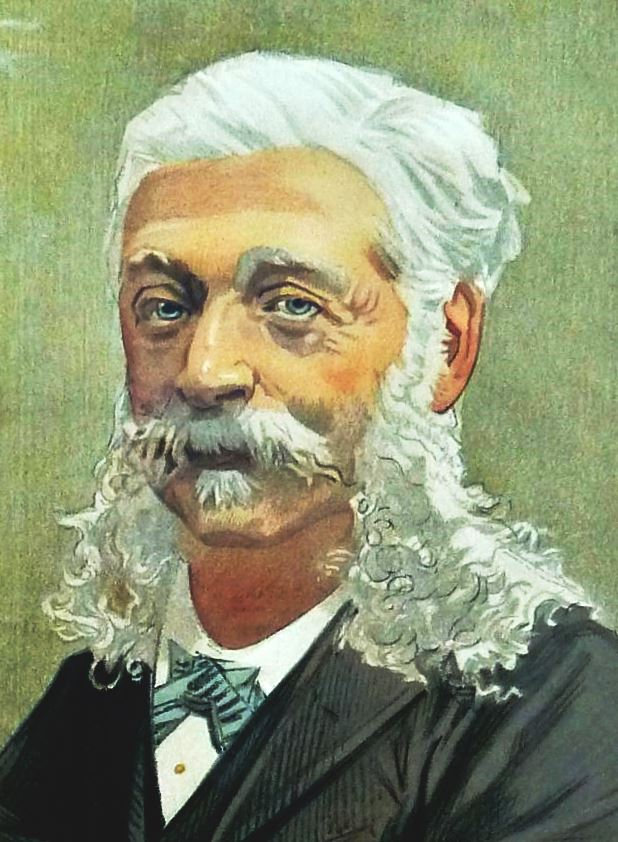
Rothschild by Guth, 1894

Alphonse de Rothschild inherited a large fortune on the death of his father in 1868, including share positions in de Rothschild Frères bank and the Chemin de Fer du Nord company. He began his training in finance at a young age and his father put him in charge of the bank's gold bullion operations.

During the 1860s, great debates raged across Europe and the United States as to an appropriate monetary system for the changing times. In France, the prominent Péreire brothers bankers were proponents of paper money in contrast to Alphonse de Rothschild who defended preservation of France's bimetallism system. Initially, Alphonse had an influential supporter for his position through his long friendship with statesman Léon Say, a former employee of the Rothschild's Chemin de Fer du Nord who became the French Minister of Finance in 1872. However, as part of the Latin Monetary Union France joined most of the rest of Europe and adopted the gold standard by 1873. In 1880, Alphonse de Rothschild put together the deal that saw the family take control of Société Le Nickel (SLN), a nickel mining business in New Caledonia.

During the Franco-Prussian War, Alphonse de Rothschild had guarded the ramparts of Paris on the eve of the Prussian siege. When a peace treaty was finally agreed to in January 1871, his bank would play a major role, not only in raising the five billion francs France was obliged to pay in reparations to the new German Empire, but in helping bring about economic stability. France made a dramatic financial recovery and repaid the reparations bill ahead of schedule which, under terms of the armistice, brought about an end to the German occupation of northern French territory in 1873. In contrast though, that same year, both the Berlin and Vienna stock markets crashed, plunging all of Central Europe into an economic depression. However, in less than a decade Alphonse de Rothschild would witness considerable economic upheaval in France. The collapse of the investment bank Société de l'Union Générale precipitated the 1882 stock market crash that triggered a downturn in the economy.

In 1883, he founded the Caspian and Black Sea Oil Company (Bnito) to compete with US oil exports. The enterprise became a competitor of Standard Oil as he tried to supply Russian oil on international markets. In 1889, the Comptoir d'Escompte de Paris bank went into receivership and shortly thereafter the Panama scandals erupted, culminating in an official enquiry into the matter conducted in 1893 by the French parliament.

His intense pressure pushed back the abrogation project of the décret Crémieux filed by the chief of the provisional government, Adolphe Thiers in 1871.

Already made a member of the Legion of Honor, for his contributions to the French economy at a time of crisis, in 1896 Alphonse de Rothschild was elevated to the Grand Cross, the highest class of the Legion of Honor.

== Thoroughbred racing ==
Alphonse de Rothschild was an enthusiastic supporter of thoroughbred horse racing who in 1852 at the age of twenty-four became a member of the Paris Jockey Club. He eventually purchased a rural property near Touques, Calvados in the Lower Normandy region where he built the Haras de Meautry horse breeding farm. There, he laid the foundation for a breeding operation that would prove highly successful for more than one hundred years and one that under the guidance of his descendants remains in operation today. Alphonse de Rothschild raced in an era before the creation of the Prix de l'Arc de Triomphe. Among the major races which his horses won were:

- Grand Prix de Paris - (1) - Le Roi Soleil (1898)
- Prix de Diane - (3) - Brie (1878), Crinière (1889) Brisk (1894)
- Poule d'Essai des Poulains - (3) - Brio (1887), Heaume (1890) et Le Nicham II (1893)
- Prix du Jockey Club - (2) - Kilt (1876) Heaume (1890)
- Prix de la Forêt - (2) - Kilt (1876) Le Nord (1891)
- Prix Morny - (4) - Louis d'Or (1879), Strelitz (1880), Fresca (1893) Thélème (1903)

== As an art collector ==
Over his lifetime Alphonse de Rothschild put together a massive collection of artworks. He was an avid collector of the Dutch Masters as well as an important assembler of Islamic works of art. In 1885 he was made a member of the Académie des Beaux-Arts and would donate and/or bequeath approximately 2,000 pieces to many different museums.

== Residences ==
As part of his father's estate, Alphonse de Rothschild inherited a large residence in Paris at 2 rue Saint-Florentin on Place de la Concorde which today is part of the American Embassy complex. In addition, he also received the Château de Ferrières, an enormous mansion and woodlands in the country about 26 km east of Paris.

== Assassination attempt ==
In August 1895, a crude letter bomb addressed to Alphonse de Rothschild was delivered to his Paris residence. Not at home, a member of the house staff had it forwarded to the de Rothschild Frères offices where it detonated, seriously injuring the chief clerk.

On his death in 1905, Alphonse's son Edouard took over as head of the family business.
