= Château de Montvillargenne =

Historic château in Gouvieux, Hauts-de-France, France

Coordinates: 49.1847°N 2.4272°E

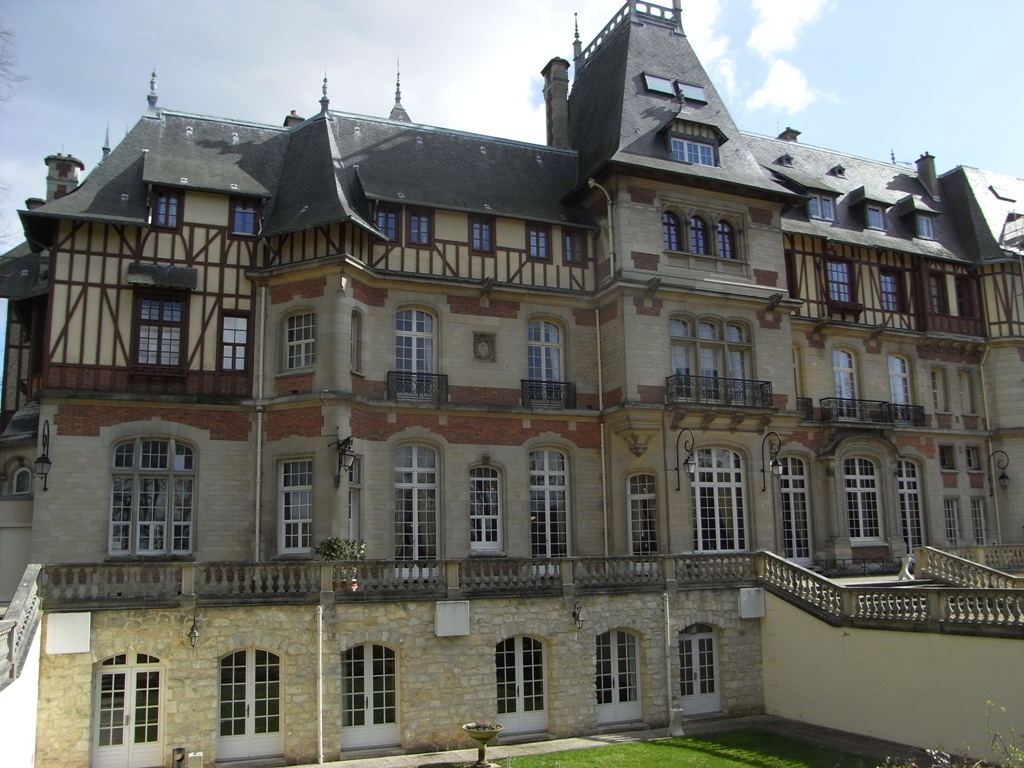
Château de Montvillargenne, 2008

The Château de Montvillargenne is a historic château located in Gouvieux near Chantilly, in the Oise, in the Hauts-de-France region.

== History ==
In 1911, Jeanne de Rothschild had a Norman style château built in Gouvieux, a commune where the London branch of the Rothschild family already owned the Château des Fontaines. The wife of Italian banker Baron Abram Leonino, who was head of the Compagnie des mines de La Lucette, she was a daughter of James Édouard de Rothschild (a son of Nathaniel de Rothschild, founder of Château Mouton Rothschild) and Thérèse von Rothschild, sister of Henri de Rothschild. After Jeanne's death in 1929, the castle was left abandoned for ten years.

=== Post World War II ===
During World War II, it was occupied by the Germans. After the war, a novitiate run by the Sisters of the Sacred Heart of Jesus was set up in the building. It was replaced by a school of arts and crafts in 1969. In 1985, the castle was transformed into a luxury hotel.

== Architecture and grounds ==
The château was designed by Léon-Maurice Chatenay, the family architect who had built the Adolphe de Rothschild ophthalmological foundation in the 19th arrondissement of Paris in 1902–1905. Construction lasted three years. The structure was built on the edge of the plateau and is in an eclectic style, with neo-Norman half-timbering.

The park was designed by landscape architect Charles Masson, who took advantage of the slope of the land to create a series of terraces, giving the whole the appearance of an Italian garden. The ground-level terrace features an orangery.

== Gallery ==
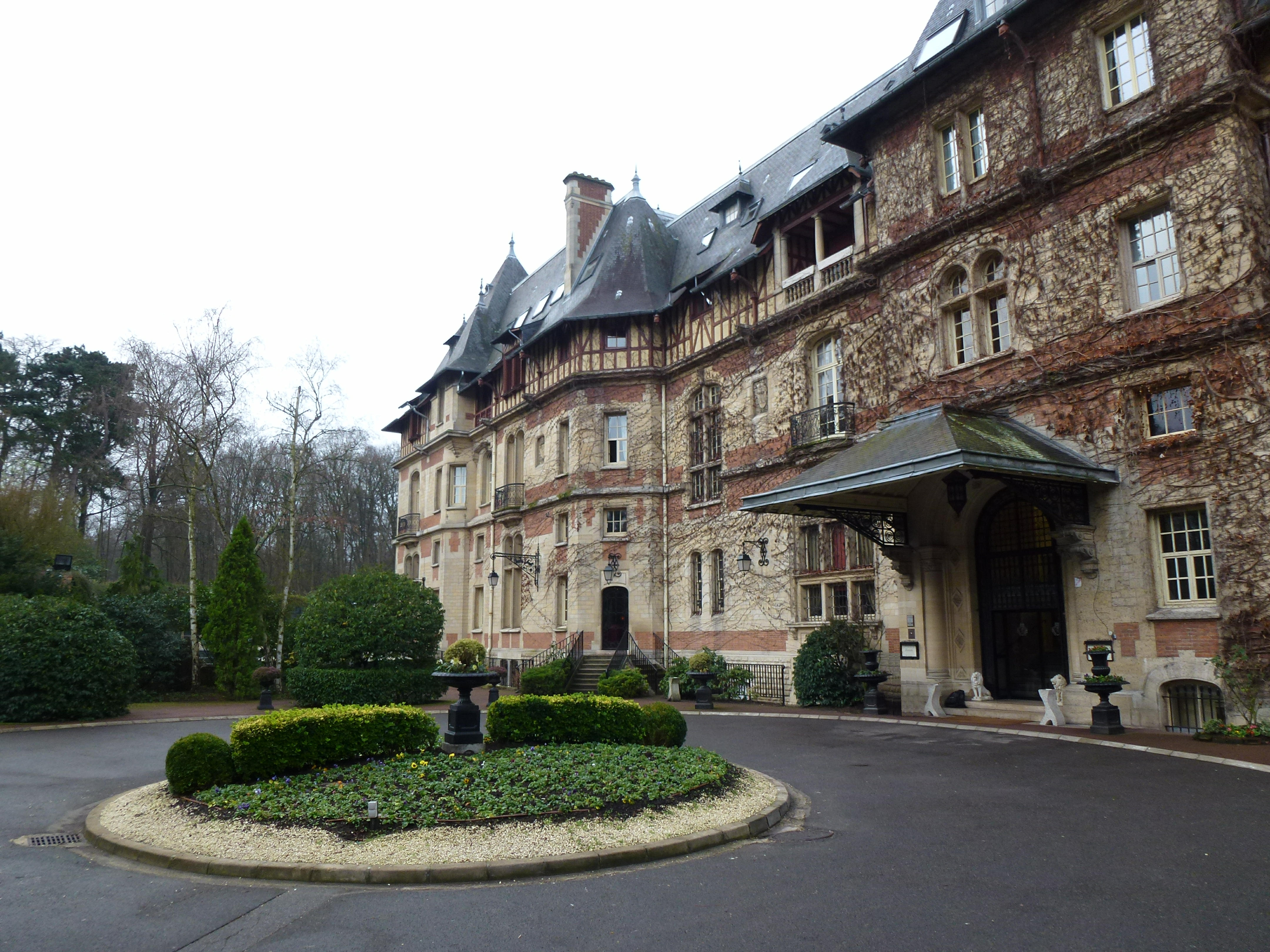
Courtyard side facade

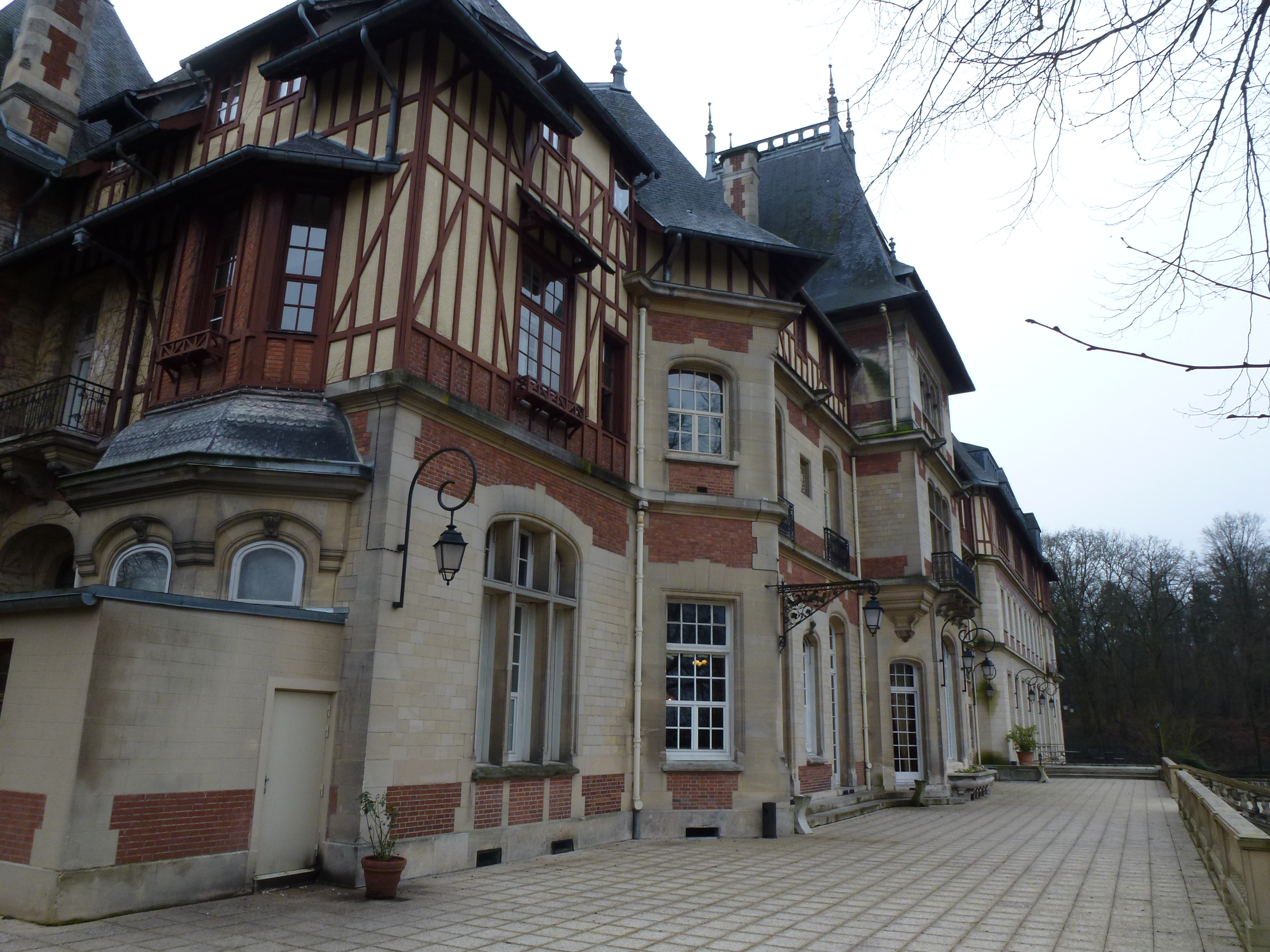
Garden side facade

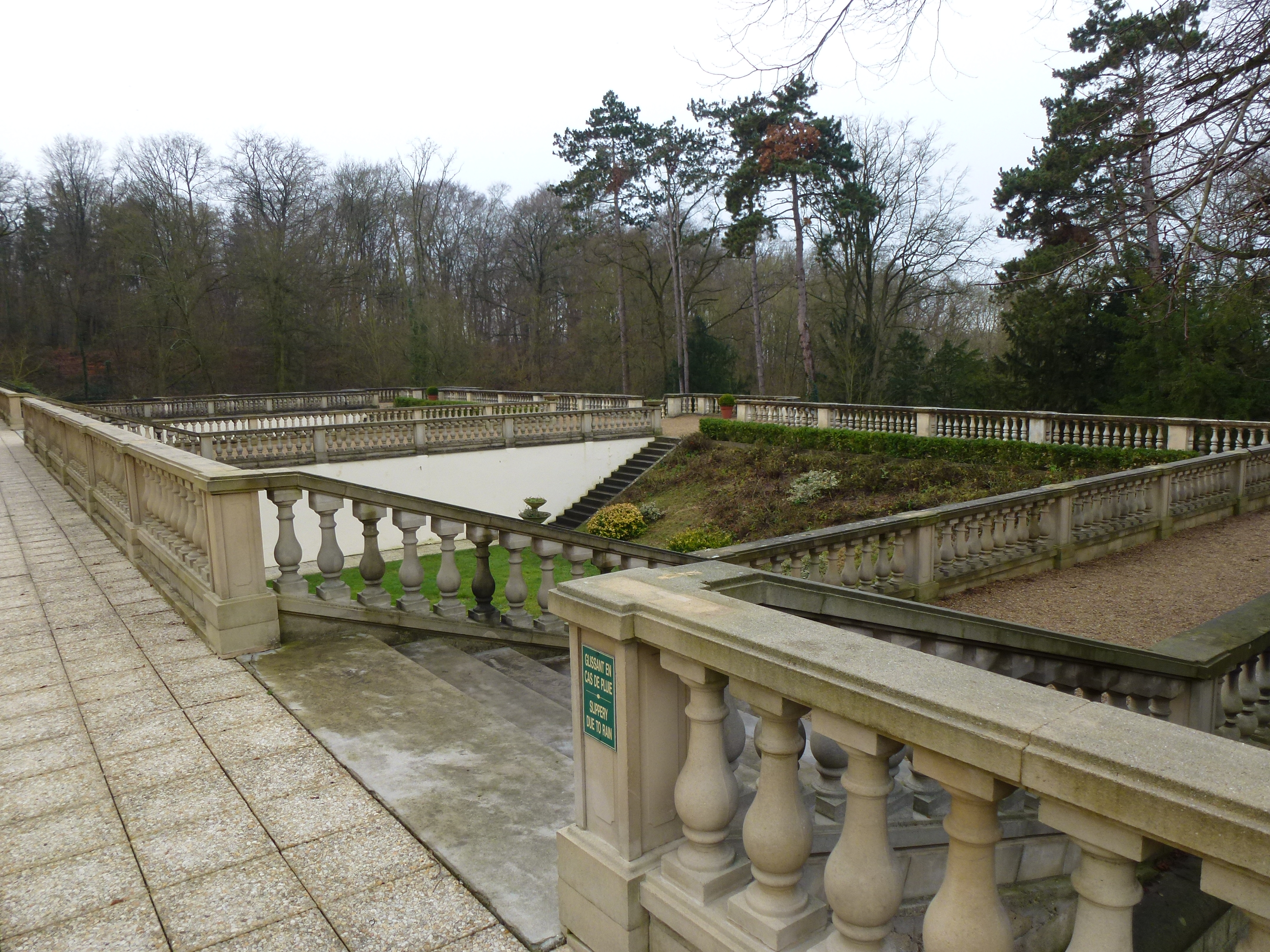
Terrace

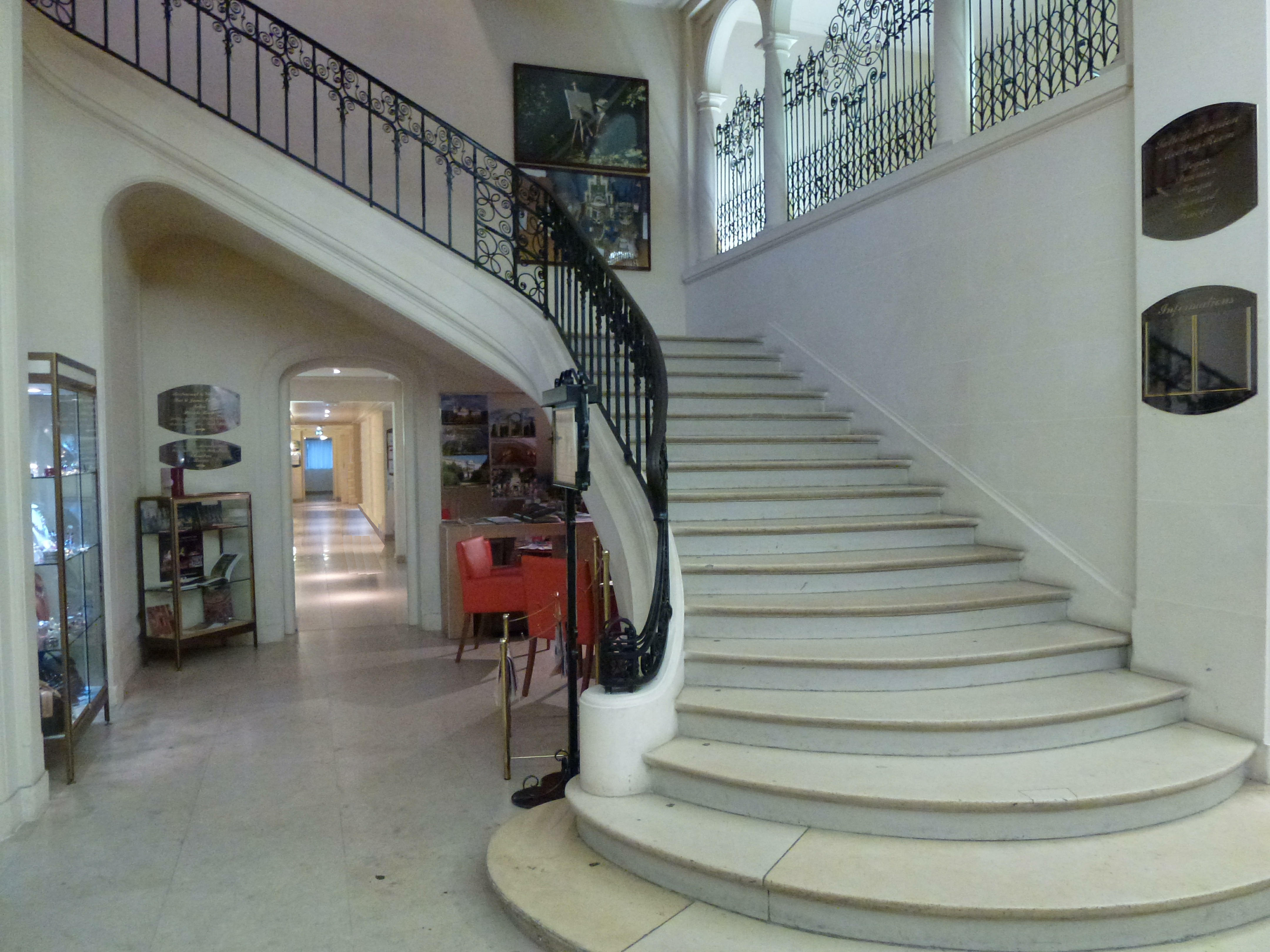
Grand staircase

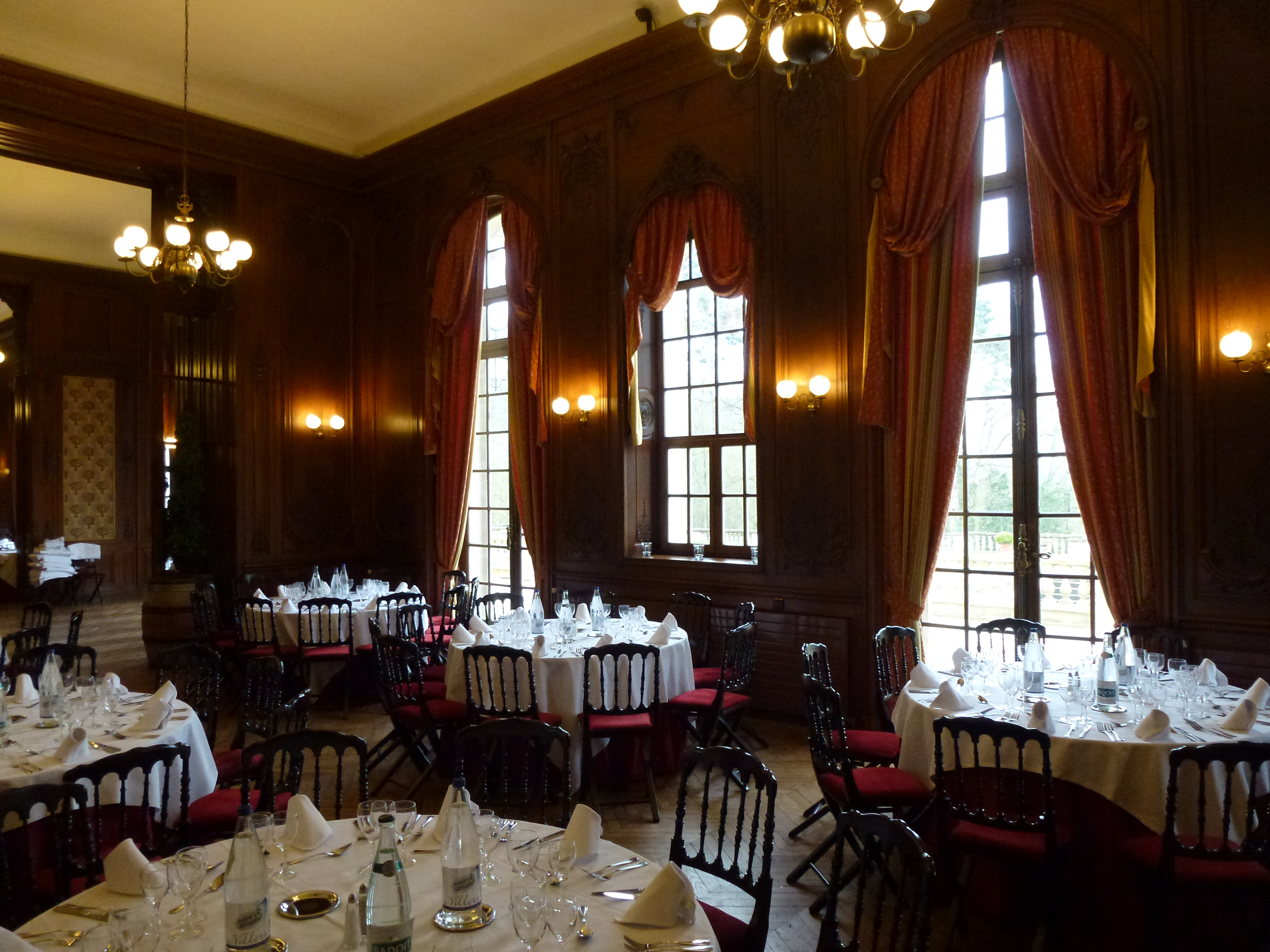
Dining room
