= Édouard Alphonse James de Rothschild =

French banker (1868–1949)

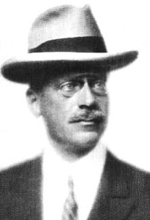
- Born: 24 February 1868; Paris, France
- Died: 30 June 1949 (aged 81); Paris, France
- Occupations: Financier, businessman, vineyard owner, art collector, racehorse owner/breeder
- Board member of: de Rothschild Frères, Banque de France, Château Lafite Rothschild
- Spouse: Germaine Alice Halphen (m. 1905)
- Children: Édouard Alphonse Émile Lionel (1906–1911); Guy Édouard Alphonse Paul (1909–2007); Jacqueline Rebecca Louise (1911–2012); Bethsabée Louise Émilie Béatrice (1914–1999)
- Parent(s): Alphonse de Rothschild (1827–1905) & Leonora de Rothschild (1837–1911)
- Family: Rothschild family

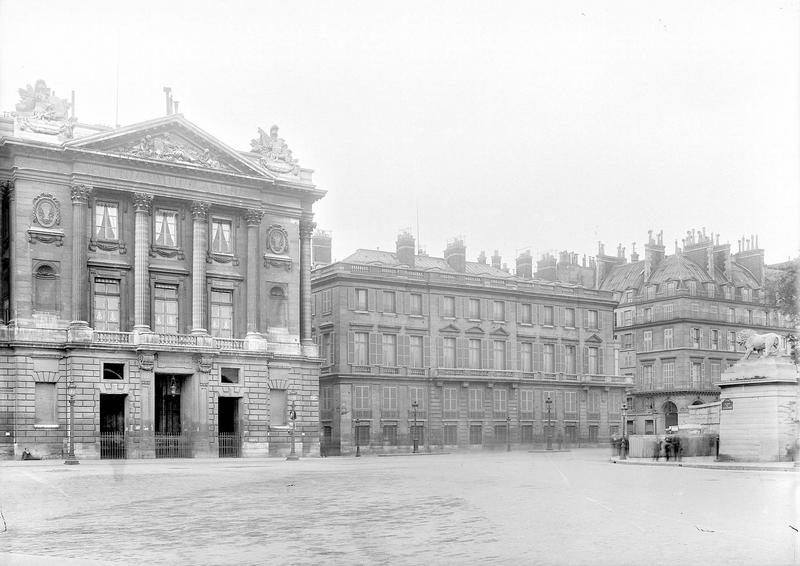
Hôtel Saint-Florentin

Édouard Alphonse James de Rothschild (24 February 1868 – 30 June 1949), also known as Baron Édouard de Rothschild, was an aristocrat, French financier and a member of the prominent Rothschild banking family of France.

== Early life ==
Born in Paris, Édouard de Rothschild was the only son of Baron Alphonse James de Rothschild. His mother was Leonora de Rothschild, the daughter of Lionel de Rothschild of the English branch of the family. He was raised in a Paris mansion at 2 rue Saint-Florentin named Hôtel Saint-Florentin, which is now home to the United States Embassy, as well as at Château de Ferrières in the country.

== Career ==
Only a few months after Édouard's marriage, his father died and he formally took over the running of de Rothschild Frères bank. His grandfather and the French bank founder, James Mayer de Rothschild, had stipulated "that the three branches of the family descended from him always be represented." As such, Édouard would be joined by the sons of two different uncles: cousin Robert Philippe de Rothschild (1880–1946) and cousin Maurice de Rothschild (1881–1957). Édouard was cautious by nature and often old-fashioned in his ideas, an attitude which extended to his personal dress and office décor. Like his father, Édouard too was appointed a director of the Banque de France. In 1911, he negotiated a deal with Henri Deterding for his Royal Dutch Shell company to purchase the Rothschilds' Azerbaijan oil fields.

In 1937, the government of France nationalized the country's railways including a major Rothschild railway asset owned in partnership with the English branch of the family. They had owned the Chemin de Fer du Nord rail transport company for almost 100 years and had an interest in the Chemins de fer de Paris à Lyon et à la Méditerranée railway which Robert represented for the family on its board of directors.

Because of cousin Maurice's perceived flamboyant playboy image and his conduct in political and business activities, Édouard considered him to be something of a black sheep. They tolerated each other for the sake of the business but by the middle of the 1930s their differences reached a point where Édouard and cousin Robert decided to force Maurice out of de Rothschild Frères bank. After extensive and bitter negotiations, a buyout was reached through an arbitrator.

Édouard de Rothschild inherited a share of the Château Lafite Rothschild vineyard in Bordeaux plus he also came into a valuable art collection from his father which he expanded through a number of important purchases. His large collection included pieces by prominent sculptors such as Jean-Louis Lemoyne and paintings from Vigée-Lebrun, Rembrandt and The Astronomer by Vermeer, amongst others.

== Thoroughbred horse racing/Polo ==
Olympic medal record

Men's polo

Representing a Mixed team
Bronze medal – third place	1900 Paris	Team competition

Like his father, Édouard de Rothschild invested in thoroughbred horse racing. A horse enthusiast who also liked to ride, he was a good polo player and a member of a team that competed in Polo at the 1900 Summer Olympics.

He inherited Haras de Meautry, a thoroughbred horse breeding farm in Touques, Calvados about 130 miles north of Paris. His sister Béatrice married Maurice Ephrussi whose family owned an estate at the village of Reux about eight miles away. In 1868, Édouard acquired the property and the Château de Reux remains in family hands to this day.

Édouard de Rothschild kept a stable of thoroughbreds at the Chantilly Racecourse in Chantilly, Oise and raced horses at racecourses throughout France with great success. Among the major races his horses won were:

- Prix de l'Arc de Triomphe - (2) - Brantôme (1934), Eclair au Chocolat (1938)
- Critérium de Saint-Cloud - (3) - Rocking Chair (1921), Tonnelle (1936) Tricaméron (1938)
- Critérium International - (4) - Flamant (1926), Godiche (1929), Brantôme (1933) Téléférique (1936)
- Grand Prix de Paris - (2) - Sans Souci II (1907) Crudité (1935)
- Grand Prix de Saint-Cloud - (4) - Prédicateur (1913), Cadum (1925), Bubbles (1929) Genièvre (1939)
- Poule d'Essai des Poulains - (2) Mont Blanc (1922) Brantôme (1934)
- Poule d'Essai des Pouliches - (4) - Flowershop (1920), Nephthys (1921), La Dame de Trèfle (1925) Ligne de Fond(1932)
- Prix de Diane - (5) - Quenouille (1919), Flowershop (1920), Perruche Bleue (1932), Vendange (1933) Péniche (1935)
- Prix du Cadran - (5) - Prédicateur (1913), Cadum (1925), Cacao (1929), Brantôme (1935) Chaudière (1936)
- Prix Jacques le Marois - (3) - Ivain (1924), Vitamine (1927) Aromate (1935)
- Prix Morny - (2) - Justitia (1898) Brantôme (1933)
- Prix Lupin - (7) - Sans Souci (1907), Floraison (1912), Le Farina (1914), Bubbles (1928), Brantome (1934), Aromate (1935), Bacchus (1939)
- Prix Royal-Oak - (5) - Stéarine (1919), Cacao (1928), Brantôme (1934), Bokbul (1935) Eclair au Chocolat (1938)
- Prix Vermeille - (2) - Stearine (1919) Tonnelle (1937)

During the German occupation of France in World War II, the Nazis seized some of the best racehorses in the country, shipping more than six hundred of them to Germany for racing and/or breeding. Among the horses stolen was Édouard de Rothschild's champion Brantôme who was sent to the German National Stud. The horse was repatriated at the end of the war in 1945 and became a leading sire.

== Nazi occupation and Vichy France, 1940–44 ==
The rise to power of Adolf Hitler's National Socialist party in Germany and the subsequent Anschluss of Austria to Germany saw a wave of Jews, and others the Nazis labeled as "undesirables," seek refuge in France. Most of these people escaped with little more than a suitcase of clothes. In March 1939, Édouard's wife Germaine converted an old house near the Château de Ferrières into a hostel for some 150 of these displaced persons.

Nazi Germany attacked France in 1940. In July 1940 Petain's French Government ordered the confiscation of the property of Baron Edouard de Rothschild and Louis Louis-Dreyfus. In 1939, Édouard's son Guy joined the French Army and his daughter Jacqueline escaped with her husband Gregor Piatigorsky to the United States. Before leaving, Édouard de Rothschild tried to hide as much of his valuable art collection as possible, on the grounds of the Haras de Meautry farm and at his Château de Reux. The Nazis confiscated his collection.

With his wife and second daughter Bethsabée, Edouard de Rothschild left France, escaping via Lisbon, Portugal to New York City. With the Allied liberation of France in 1944, Édouard de Rothschild and his wife returned home, where he died in Paris in 1949 at the age of eighty-one. His son Guy took over as head of the family bank.

== Personal life ==
On 1 March 1905, Edouard de Rothschild married Germaine Alice Halphen. They had four children, but according to his daughter Jacqueline, neither parent paid much attention to them. Their children were:

- Édouard Alphonse Émile Lionel de Rothschild (1906–1911). He died at the age of five of appendicitis. According to the autobiography of his sister Jacqueline, the young English nurse of the two Rothschild boys had not told their mother that the boy had been ill and suffering for months before a doctor could diagnose appendicitis. The boy died shortly after the operation: "My parents set up an operating room in Ferrières which, of course, was not sterile, nor did it have the facilities of a hospital."
- Guy Édouard Alphonse Paul de Rothschild (1909–2007), who from 1937 to 1956 was married to Baroness Alix Hermine Jeanette Schey de Koromla (1911–1982), and who later married Baroness Marie-Hélène van Zuylen van Nyevelt (1927–1996) in 1957
- Jacqueline Rebecca Louise de Rothschild (1911–2012), who from 1930 to 35 was married to Robert Calmann-Levy (1899–1982), and who later married renowned cellist Gregor Piatigorsky (1903–1976) in 1937. In her autobiography she explains her birth in Paris on November 11, 1911 (the year her brother Alphonse had died of appendicitis (see above) as follows: "My mother came home from the funeral [of my brother] and said, 'I want another child immediately.' Nine months later I was born. I came to replace a neglected and lost son. I was loved with guilt.I was treasured with fear. Yes, I was a Rothschild, but a girl. Were my parents disappointed? I wondered."
- Bethsabée Louise Émilie Béatrice de Rothschild (1914–1999), who from 1948 to 1951 was married to Donald Bloomingdale (1913–1954),
