= Pips Schey =

Austro-Hungarian baron

Philipp Schey Freiherr von Koromla (Hungarian: koromlai Schey Fülöp; 23 June 1881 – 27 June 1957), known as Pips Schey, was an Austro-Hungarian baron.

He was the son of Paul Gustav Schey von Koromla (1855–1922), and the grandson of Friedrich Schey von Koromla (1815–1881).

Schey is described in detail in Patrick Leigh Fermor's 1977 memoir, A Time of Gifts. Fermor compares him to Marcel Proust's character Charles Swann, and notes that Schey's "extraordinary good looks were marked by a kind of radiant distinction. Schey is also discussed in Edmund de Waal's 2010 memoir The Hare with Amber Eyes.

Schey married twice and had four children; David René de Rothschild is his grandson.
