= David René de Rothschild =

French-American banker; member of the French branch of the Rothschild family

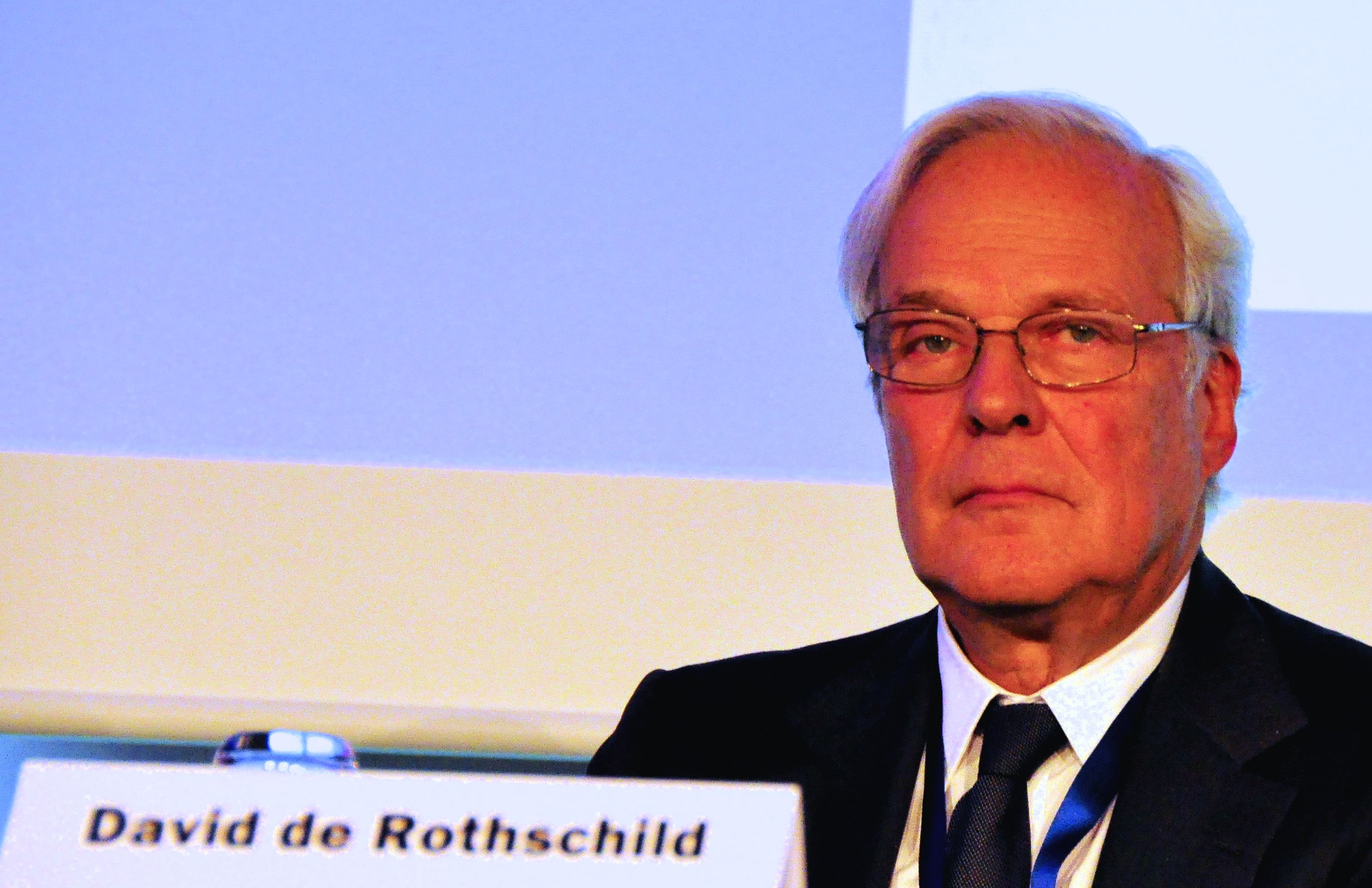
- Rothschild in 2014
- Born: December 15, 1942 (age 83); New York City, U.S.
- Education: Institut d'Études Politiques de Paris
- Alma mater: Sciences Po
- Occupation: Financier
- Organization: World Jewish Congress
- Spouse: Princess Olimpia Anna Aldobrandini (m.1974)
- Children: 4, including Alexandre
- Parent(s): Guy de Rothschild; Alix Hermine Jeannette Schey de Koromla
- Family: Rothschild family

Baron David René James de Rothschild (French pronunciation: [david ʁəne ʒɛms də ʁɔtʃild]; born December 15, 1942) is a French banker and a member of the French branch of the Rothschild family. Since 2018, he is supervisory board chairman of Rothschild & Co and chairman of Rothschild Continuation Holdings, a Swiss holding company.

== Early life and education ==
David de Rothschild was born in New York City (the first "Free French" registered at the Consulate according to him), as a result of his parents having to escape the Germans during the German occupation of France in World War II. He is the son of Guy de Rothschild (1909–2007) and his first wife and distant cousin, the former Baroness Alix Hermine Jeannette Schey de Koromla (1911–1982). His maternal grandfather was the Hungarian Baron Pips Schey. While his mother remained in New York City throughout the war, his father went to England where he joined the Free French Forces. Following the liberation of France, the family returned to their home in Paris. His parents eventually divorced. David de Rothschild was educated at Institut d'Études Politiques de Paris in Paris from which he graduated in 1966.

He has one half-brother: Baron Édouard de Rothschild from his father's later marriage to Baroness Marie-Hélène van Zuylen van Nyevelt.

== Career ==
David René de Rothschild first worked at Société miniére et métallurgique de Peñarroya, a mining company owned by his family and headquartered in Paris. Afterwards, he did a training in the family-controlled Banque Rothschild.

When the French government reform of banking regulations ended the legal distinction between banques d'affaires and deposit banks, the bank de Rothschild Frères became Banque Rothschild in 1967, a limited-liability company. David de Rothschild's father was an aggressive businessman who strove to expand the bank and their investments in mining and oil exploration as chairman of Imetal S.A. However, the family fortunes suffered a severe setback following the election to the French Presidency of the socialist government of François Mitterrand in 1981. The new parliament nationalized the Banque Rothschild.

In 1986, when the Socialists lost power, the Rothschild family got a new banking license in France, thanks to a helping hand from Robert Badinter. In 1987 — joined by his half-brother Edouard, step-brother Count Philippe de Nicolay, and cousin Eric de Rothschild — David René de Rothschild created Rothschild & Cie Banque, the successor of Banque Rothschild. During the 1990s, he bought a small share in N M Rothschild & Sons, the two entities started to converge, and he became deputy chairman of N M Rothschild & Sons. In 2003, following the retirement of Sir Evelyn Robert de Rothschild as head of N M Rothschild & Sons of London, the UK and French firms merged to become one umbrella entity called "Group Rothschild". Ownership was shared equally between the French and British branches of the family under the leadership of David de Rothschild. The French President Emmanuel Macron had previously worked at his bank.

In 2015, Rothschild was indicted in Spain for fraud in relation to a scheme that allegedly defrauded British retirees who signed up for an inheritance tax minimization scheme.

In 2018, his son Alexandre de Rothschild took his succession as Chairman of Rothschild & Co, while David René de Rothschild became chairman of the supervisory board.

== Other roles and mandates ==
Rothschild holds or has held the following positions:

- Member of the supervisory board of Compagnie Financiere Saint-Honore
- Member of the supervisory board of Compagnie Financiere Martin Maurel.
- Member of the supervisory board of De Beers Group
- Member of the supervisory board of Groupe Casino
- 2013-...: President of the World Jewish Congress
- President of the Fondation pour la Mémoire de la Shoah
- President of the French Entente Cordiale Scholarship trust,
- Minority shareholder of the vineyard Château Lafite-Rothschild
- Member of Entreprise et Cité

== Personal life ==
In 1974, David de Rothschild married the Italian Princess Olimpia Anna Aldobrandini (b. 1955) in Reux, Calvados. Yves Saint Laurent designed the bride's dress. They have four children:

- Lavinia de Rothschild
- Stéphanie de Rothschild de Buffévent
- Alexandre de Rothschild; Alexandre became executive chairman of the family business in 2018.
- Louise de Rothschild

As of 2022, his net worth was estimated at €575 million by French weekly business magazine Challenges.
