= Édouard de Rothschild =

French businessman (born 1957)

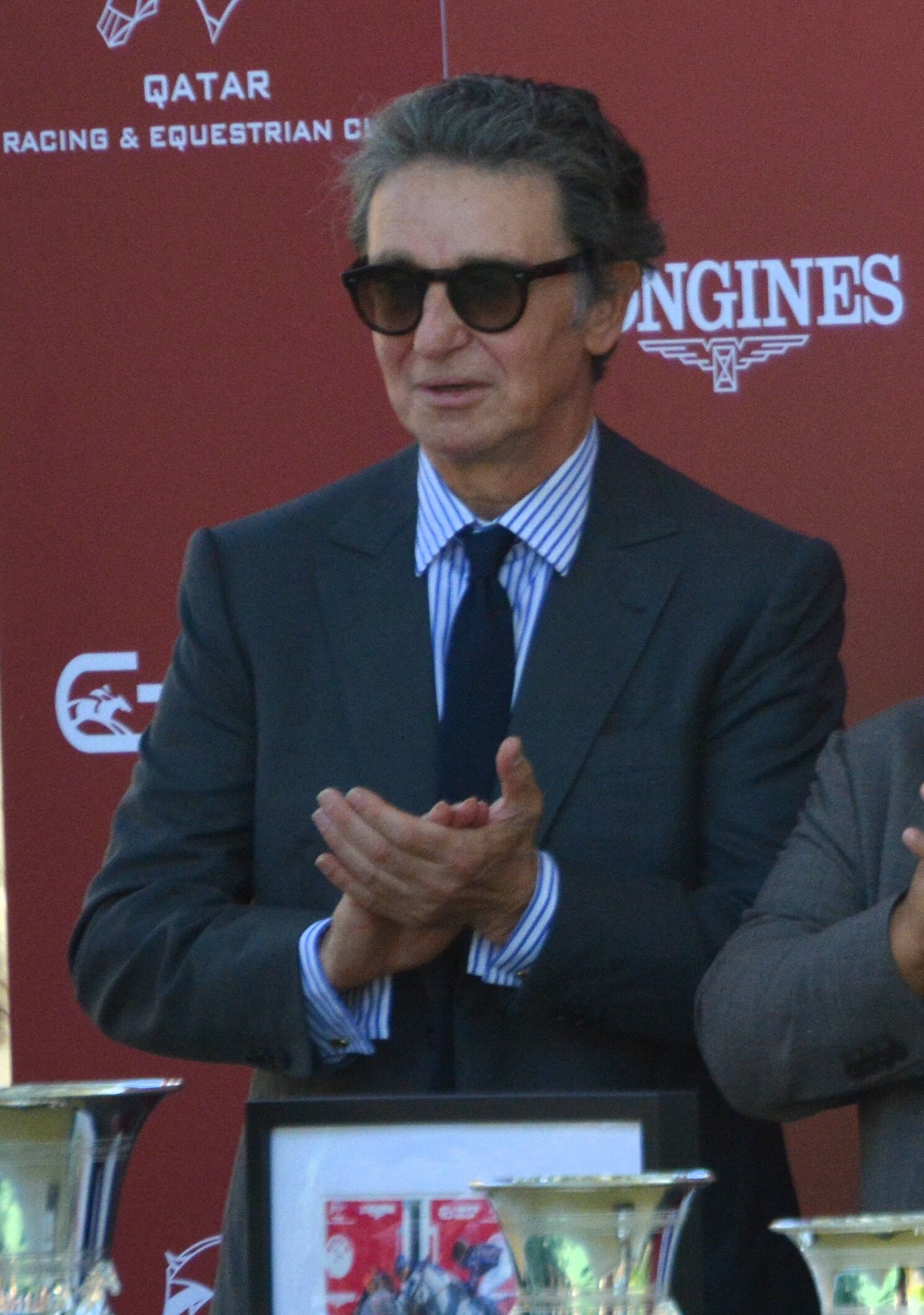
- Born: Édouard Étienne Alphonse de Rothschild; 27 December 1957 (age 68); Neuilly-sur-Seine, Hauts-de-Seine, France
- Education: Cours Hattemer
- Alma mater: Panthéon-Assas University; New York University
- Spouses: Mathilde de la Ferté (m. 1982, divorced) Arielle Marie Mallard (m. 1991)
- Children: 4
- Parent(s): Guy de Rothschild; Marie-Hélène van Zuylen van Nyevelt
- Relatives: David René de Rothschild (half-brother)

Baron Édouard Étienne Alphonse de Rothschild (French: [edwaʁ etjɛn alfɔ̃s də ʁɔtʃild]; born 27 December 1957) is a businessman and part of the French branch of the Rothschild family.

== Early life and education ==
Édouard de Rothschild was born in Neuilly-sur-Seine, Hauts-de-Seine. He is the son of Guy de Rothschild (1909–2007) and Marie-Hélène van Zuylen van Nyevelt (1927–1996). His father is Jewish and his mother is of half Syrian, one-quarter Dutch, and one-quarter Jewish descent.

He attended the Cours Hattemer, a private school in Paris. He studied law at Panthéon-Assas University in France and in 1985 graduated with an M.B.A. degree from the Stern School of Business at New York University.

== Career ==
Édouard de Rothschild started his career at the New York bank Wertheim. He then moved to Paris to work for Eurofin, Georges Plescoff's new bank. In 1982, he joined his half-brother David René de Rothschild and cousin Éric de Rothschild to recapitalize and relaunch Rothschild & Cie Banque. In July 2003, he became the head of the bank. He stepped down in June 2004 saying he would remain involved as the non-executive chairman of the bank's supervisory board while taking on projects unrelated to finance. Until May 2005, he was a member of the Supervisory Board at Imerys S.A., a company the family had been a majority or significant shareholder in since 1880.

In January 2005, Édouard de Rothschild invested €20 million for a 37% controlling stake in the French newspaper Libération. The left-wing daily was founded by philosopher Jean-Paul Sartre and Maoist militant journalist Serge July in 1973 but in recent years has sustained substantial losses. In 2010, he became president of the board of Libération and moved to Israel. His shares were heavily diluted when, in 2014, Patrick Drahi became the new owner of the newspaper.

He owns a share of the Château Lafite vineyard. He is a member of the think tank Le Siècle.

== Personal life ==
In 1991, he married Arielle Marie Mallard (b. 1963), the vice-president of CARE France; she previously worked at the World Bank and Lazard Frères. Together, they have four children:

1. David de Rothschild (born 1998, twin)
2. Aliénor Marie-Hélène Jacqueline de Rothschild (born 1998, twin)
3. Ferdinand de Rothschild
4. Louis de Rothschild

An avid horse enthusiast, Édouard de Rothschild competes both nationally and internationally in equestrian show jumping. In 1973, he was disqualified from the Junior French Cup, which shattered his dream to become a professional horse racer. He inherited the Haras de Meautry stud farm in Toques in Basse-Normandie where he breeds thoroughbred race horses. His involvement in racing led to his 2003 election as President of the French horse racing association France Galop, replacing the defunct Jean-Luc Lagardère (reelected in 2015). Being of partial Jewish descent, he accepted an invitation in 2010 from the Israeli Equestrian Federation to represent Israel in international competitions. He used his Israeli nationality to compete in the 2012 Olympics but his horse Lamm de Fétan was hurt before the competition.

== See also ==
- Rothschild banking family of France

== Bibliography ==
- Rimbert, Pierre (2005). Libération de Sartre à Rothschild (in French). Liber/Raisons d'agir. ISBN 978-2912107251.
