= Dujarric =

Dujarric can be both a middle name and a surname. Notable people with the name include:

- René Dujarric de la Rivière, French microbiologist and hygienist
- Julio Dujarric (born 1977), Dominican sport shooter
- Stéphane Dujarric (born 1965), French-born journalist
