= Anka Muhlstein =

French historian and writer

- Born: 1935 (age 90–91); Paris, France
- Spouse(s): Francois Dujarric de la Rivière (ended in divorce) Louis Begley (m. 1974)
- Children: Robert Dujarric (b. 1961); Stéphane Dujarric (b. 1965)
- Relatives: Anatol Mühlstein (father); Robert de Rothschild (maternal grandfather); René Dujarric de la Rivière (father-in-law)
- Writing career
- Notable awards: Prix Goncourt (1996)

Anka Muhlstein (born 1935) is a French historian and biographer.

== Early life ==
Muhlstein was born to Anatol Mühlstein and Diane de Rothschild in Paris in 1935. Her older sister was endocrinologist Nathalie Josso, and her younger sister is artist Cécile Muhlstein.

During World War II, she stayed in New York City before returning to France in 1945. She was married to François Dujarric de la Rivière (1933-2018), an investment adviser in Paris and son of Marcelle and René Dujarric de la Rivière, with whom she had two sons, Robert and Stéphane Dujarric, and whom she later divorced. In March 1974, she married Louis Begley, a lawyer and author, and moved back to New York with her two sons.

== Career ==
Muhlstein has been honored twice by the French Academy's prize for history, for her biographies on her ancestor James de Rothschild, the founder of the De Rothschild Frères, and the eighteenth century explorer Cavelier de La Salle.

Muhlstein received the Goncourt prize in 1996 for biography for her work on the French writer Astolphe de Custine called A Taste for Freedom: The Life of Astolphe de Custine. Muhlstein 's other works include Par les yeux de Marcel Proust (1971), La Femme Soleil (1976), Victoria (1978), Manhattan (1986), Reines éphémères, Mères perpétuelles (2001), Les Périls du Mariage (2004), and Napoléon à Moscou (2007).

In 2008, she and her husband Begley released Venice for Lovers, two essays and a short story they individually wrote about Venice. Her Garcon, un cent d'huîtres (Balzac's Omelette: A Delicious Tour of French Food and Culture With Honoré de Balzac in English, translated by Adriana Hunter), a study of the role of gastronomy in the novels of Balzac, was published in 2010.

In 2017, her book, The Pen and the Brush: How Passion for Art Shaped Nineteenth-Century French Novels, was published by Other Press. Julian Barnes wrote, "Anka Muhlstein wisely limits herself to prose writers, and to five who speak to her most clearly: Balzac, Zola, Huysmans, Maupassant, and ... Proust". Jonah Raskin's review acclaimed The Pen and the Brush as "riveting".

In 2023, her book Camille Pissarro: The Audacity of Impressionism was published by Other Press. It was a translation by Adriana Hunter of Camille Pissarro: Le Premier Impressionniste, published in Paris by Plon. Adam Gopnik wrote, "Muhlstein is a sympathetic chronicler of Pissarro's life ... [and] she has real insight to offer into the practical economics of Impressionist painting."
