= Pendant portraits of Maerten Soolmans and Oopjen Coppit =

Pair of 1634 paintings by Rembrandt

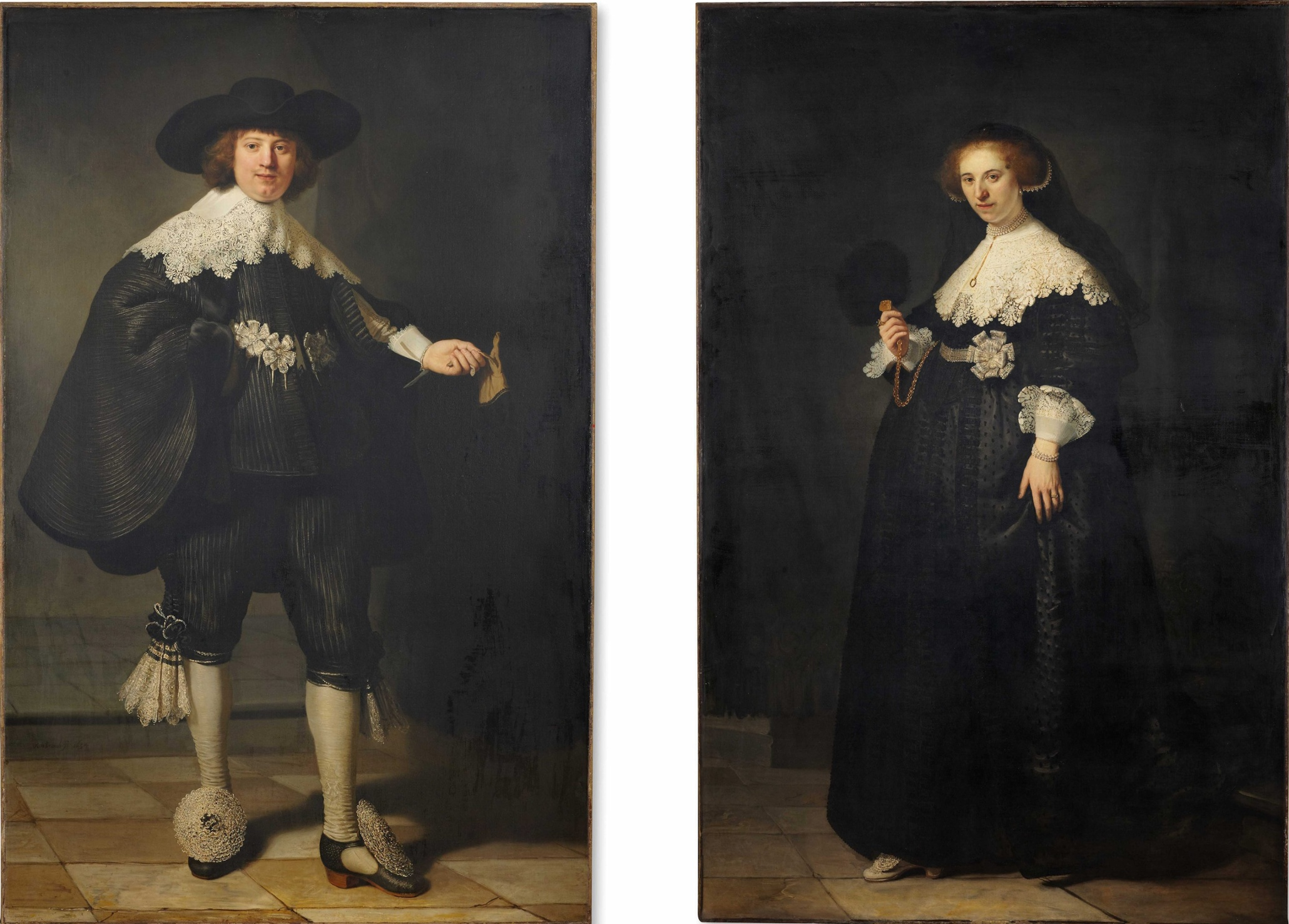

The pendant portraits of Maerten Soolmans and Oopjen Coppit are a pair of full-length wedding portraits by Rembrandt. They were painted on the occasion of the marriage of Maerten Soolmans and Oopjen Coppit in 1634. Formerly owned by the Rothschild family, they became jointly owned by the Louvre Museum and the Rijksmuseum in 2015 after both museums managed to contribute half of the purchase price of €160 million, a record for works by Rembrandt.

== History ==
The portraits were painted by Rembrandt upon the occasion of the wedding of Maerten Soolmans and Oopjen Coppit in 1634. Although the subjects were painted individually, the portraits have been kept together since their inception. Unlike many 17th-century portrait pairs, these two have always hung side by side in various collections based in Amsterdam or Paris. They are also unusual in Rembrandt's oeuvre for their size and the fact that they show the subjects at full length. Appearing in period inventories at regular intervals since their creation, together they form part of Rembrandt's core oeuvre against which other paintings with a more questionable lineage are compared. The subjects Maerten Soolmans and his wife Oopjen Coppit are dressed as befits a pair of wealthy Amsterdam newlyweds. Though most in the art world agree these paintings should remain together, it became impossible for France to keep them within its borders, as the Louvre was unable to guarantee the necessary funding required to keep the ministry of culture from providing an export permit. The paintings have not been declared French national heritage.

== Portrait of Maerten Soolmans ==
Pendant portraits of Maerten Soolmans and Oopjen Coppit
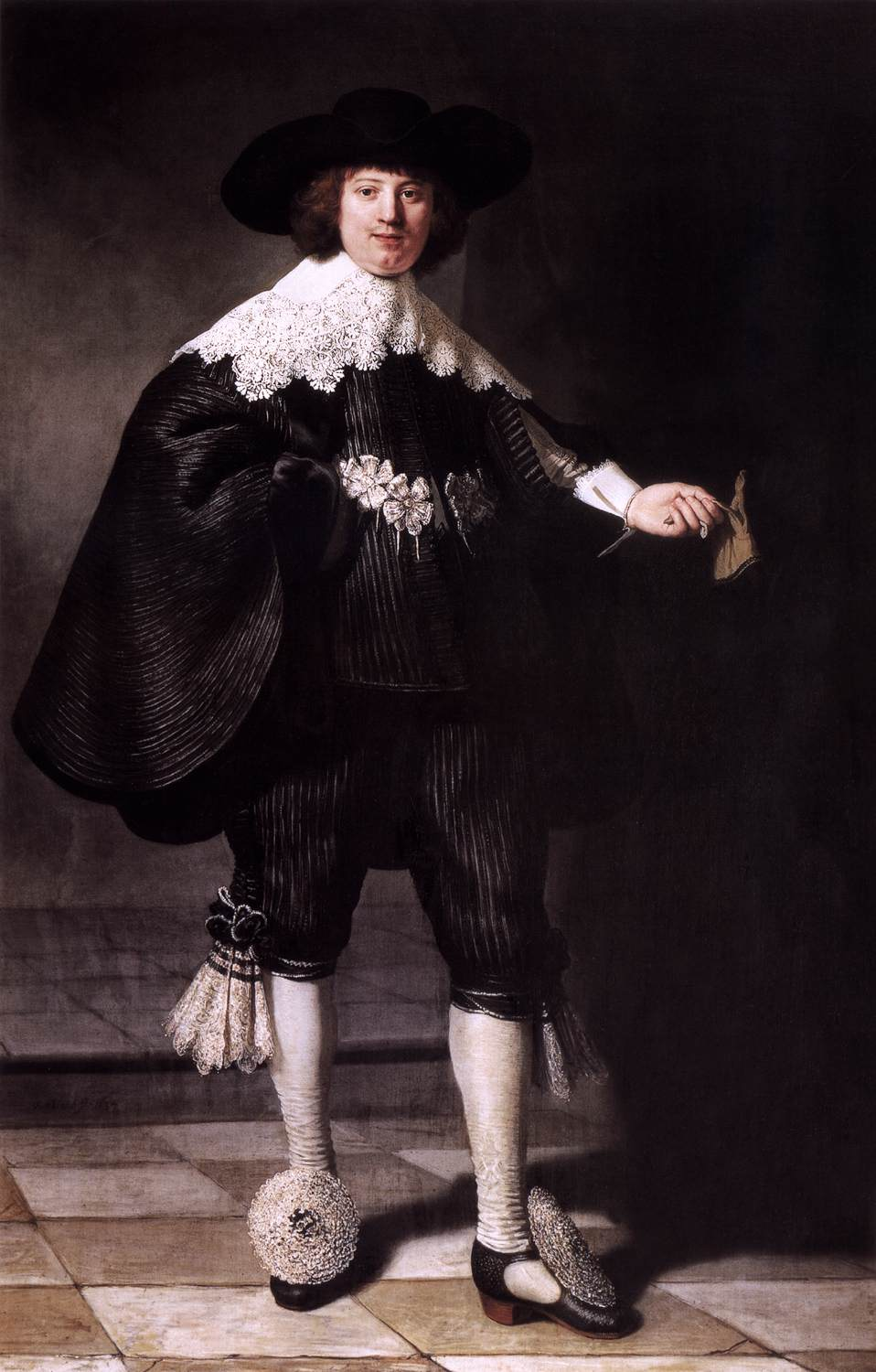
- Portrait of Maerten Soolmans
- Artist: Rembrandt
- Year: 1634
- Catalogue: Rembrandt Research Project, A Corpus of Rembrandt Paintings VI: #120a
- Medium: Oil on canvas
- Dimensions: 209.5 cm × 135.5 cm (82.5 in × 53.3 in)
- Location: Rijksmuseum and Louvre, Amsterdam and Paris

Portrait of Maerten Soolmans (1613–1641) was documented by Cornelis Hofstede de Groot in 1915, who wrote:

637 MAERTEN DAEY (1604-after 1650). Sm. 340.; Bode 303; Dut. 208; Wb. 316; B.-HdG. 107. Full length; life size. About thirty. He is seen almost in full face. He walks a little to the right on the parti-coloured stone floor, at the back of which is a step. He wears a very rich black costume, consisting of a coat with large stripes, breeches, and a short cloak of the same material, a broad and close-fitting lace collar, smooth cuffs, rosettes of lace at his waistband and on his shoes, and white stockings, with bows of rich lace on his garters. A broad-brimmed black slouch hat covers his thick fair hair; he has a plump and beardless face. His right hand rests on his hip under the cloak; his out-stretched left hand holds a glove. In the right background is a bluish-green curtain. [Pendant to 638.]

Signed on the left at foot, "Rembrandt f. 1634"; canvas, 82 inches by 52 inches. Etched by L. Flameng in the Gazette des Beaux-Arts, 1879; in the Nederlandsche Kunstbode, 1879, p. 2; and in Dutuit. Mentioned by Vosmaer, pp. 145, 502; Bode, p. 402; Dutuit, p. 52; Michel, p. 148 [112-14, 436]; Moes, 1881. Exhibited at Amsterdam 1867, No. 161.

Sale. Hendrik Daey, Alkmaar, 1798 (4000 florins, with pendant, R. M. Pruyssenaar and Adriaen Daey, who sold the pair to Van Winter for 12,000 florins). In the Van Winter collection, Amsterdam, which passed by inheritance to the Van Loons. In the Van Loon collection, Amsterdam; sold as a whole in 1877 to the Rothschilds. In the collection of Baron Gustave de Rothschild, Paris. In the collection of Baron Robert de Rothschild, Paris.

— Hofstede de Groot, 1915

== Portrait of Oopjen Coppit ==
Pendant portraits of Maerten Soolmans and Oopjen Coppit
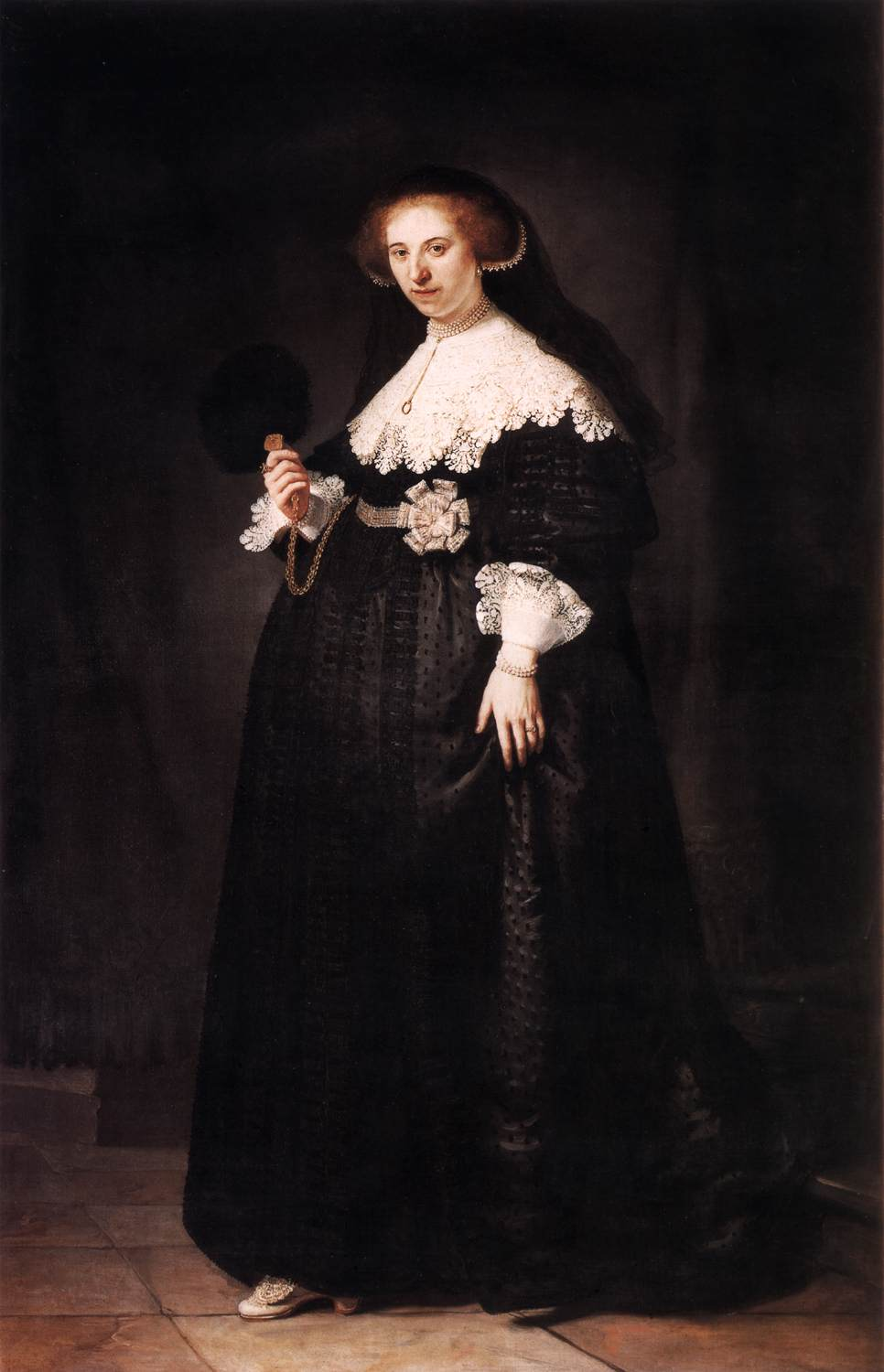
- Portrait of Oopjen Coppit
- Artist: Rembrandt
- Year: 1634
- Catalogue: Rembrandt Research Project, A Corpus of Rembrandt Paintings VI: #120b
- Medium: Oil on canvas
- Dimensions: 210 cm × 134.5 cm (83 in × 53.0 in)
- Location: Louvre and Rijksmuseum, Paris and Amsterdam

Portrait of Oopjen Coppit (1611–1689) was documented by Hofstede de Groot in 1915, who wrote:

638 MACHTELD VAN DOORN (1605-1646), from 1629 the wife of Martin Daey. Sm. 551.; Bode 304; Dut. 209; Wb. 317; B.-HdG. 108. Full length; life size. About thirty. She walks to the left along a footpath paved with stones, and looks at the spectator. She holds up in her right hand, by a gold chain, a rich fan of black ostrich feathers; with her left hand, as she descends a step, she lightly raises her handsome spotted gown of black silk with a high bodice, against which her broad and close-fitting lace collar and her lace-trimmed wristbands stand out in relief. At her waistband and on her shoe are rosettes of lace. Her fair curls are caught up at the back in a cap; a thick black veil falls from it down her back. At her throat and on her arms are several strings of pearls, and there is a pearl in each ear. A gold ring hangs by a fine chain from her lace collar. In the right background is a bluish-green curtain. [Pendant to 637.]

Signed, "Rembrandt f. 1634"; canvas, 82 inches by 52 inches. Etched by L. Flameng in the Gazette des Beaux-Arts, 1879; in Dutuit; and in the Nederlandsche Kunstbode, 1879. Mentioned by Vosmaer, pp. 254, 533; Bode, p. 402; Dutuit, p. 52; Michel, p. 148 [112-14, 436]; Moes, 2075. Exhibited at Amsterdam, 1867, No. 162. Sale. Hendrik Daey, Alkmaar, 1798 (4000 florins, with pendant, R. M. Pruyssenaar and Adriaen Daey, who sold the pictures for 12,000 florins to Van Winter).

In the Van Winter collection, Amsterdam, which passed by inheritance to the Van Loons, and was acquired as a whole in 1877 by the Rothschilds. In the collection of Baron Gustave de Rothschild, Paris. In the collection of Baron Robert de Rothschild, Paris.

— Hofstede de Groot, 1915

Oopjen is wearing a flat lace collar with matching wrist collars in the latest fashion. Other Amsterdam brides of the regency class wore millstone collars well into the 1640s. She is also wearing a pearl necklace and a pearl bracelet, and pearls were considered more valuable than diamonds at that time. The format of the paintings showing the couple at full length was the most expensive form of marriage pendant and could only fit in a house with high ceilings. According to family inventories, they also owned another Rembrandt depicting the Holy Family. It is assumed that this is the Holy Family now in Munich, as that is also dated to 1634.

== Identity of the sitters ==
The paintings were known as the "Portrait of Meneer Day" and "Portrait of Mevrouw Day" for over a century. He and his wife, who married 9 June 1633, were only properly identified in the 20th century. The confusion of the names came about because after Maerten died, Oopjen remarried Captain Maerten Pietersz. Daij, and she outlived this second husband as well. After her death the paintings remained in the Daij or Daey family and members of that family assumed the portraits were of Daij and his first wife.

== 2016 sale ==
The joint purchase of these paintings was made by the Rijksmuseum and the Louvre on February 1, 2016. For the first time since 60 years, they were exhibited at the Louvre on March 10, 2016 until June 13, then for another 3 months at the Rijksmuseum, before their restoration. The intergovernmental agreement will keep these pendants together, alternately at the Louvre again, then at the Rijksmuseum for five years, followed by periods of eight years. They consequently may not be lent to other institutions.

== Provenance ==
The portraits were in the possession of the subjects' heirs until their sale in 1877 to Gustave Samuel de Rothschild, a French banker. They were lent for exhibition once only, to the Rijksmuseum in 1956 for the artist's 350th birthday. Before being sold, they were hung in a large hall in the Van Loon collection, described by Eugène Fromentin in 1877 with the remark that they were examples of Rembrandt at his best and were painted in the same period that Rembrandt painted his Anatomy Lesson of Dr. Nicolaes Tulp, traditionally marking the beginning of his career in Amsterdam. Clearly, the flamboyance of these young newlyweds did more to launch Rembrandt's career as a portrait painter for the Amsterdam upper class than his sober depiction of a class of serious students in Leiden. The entire Van Loon collection was sold to Rothschild for 40,000 pounds, which at the time was over a million francs.

Wilhelm von Bode was impressed enough to include both in his set of 595 photogravures for his eight-volume 1898 treatise on Rembrandt. Fromentin and Bode had identified the paintings as portraits of Mr. and Mrs. Daey, but it was the Amsterdam historian Isabella Henriette van Eeghen who painstakingly traced their ownership to their original inventories and established the identities of the portrayed.

The current joined ownership is a new arrangement for the Louvre and Rijksmuseum, and it remains to be seen whether this experiment in international art purchasing will fit into exhibition plans of both institutions. Unlike many expensive paintings, these two will not be restricted by location and it is expected that they will be on tour regularly. According to Wim Pijbes, director of the Rijksmuseum, the paintings will not be separated, and each museum will own 50 percent of each painting.

== Other records ==
The previous record for a pair of paintings was for two Titians, his Diana and Callisto and Diana and Actaeon, that also hang side by side and are today joinedly owned by the National Gallery and the National Galleries of Scotland. The previous record for a painting purchase at the Rijksmuseum was for A Mayor of Delft and his Daughter by Jan Steen, for which they paid 11.9 million euro's in July 2004. The most expensive Rembrandt portrait sold before these is Portrait of a Foreign Admiral, sold at Christie's in December 2009 for £20 million.

== Other Rembrandt portraits of women in the 1630s ==
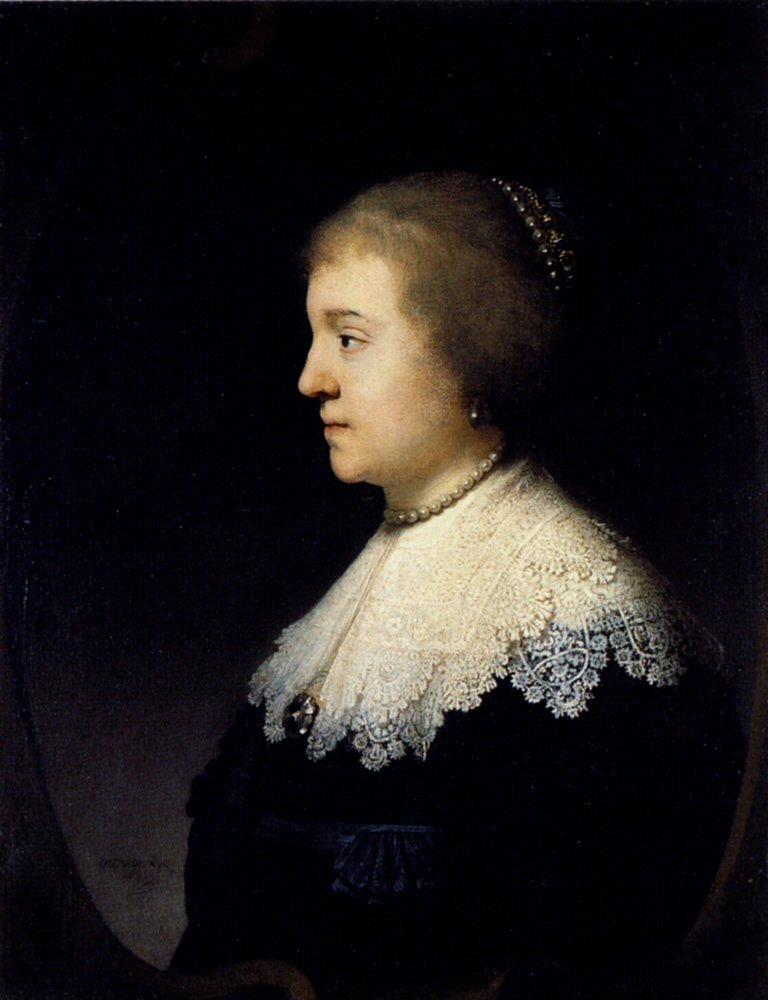
1632

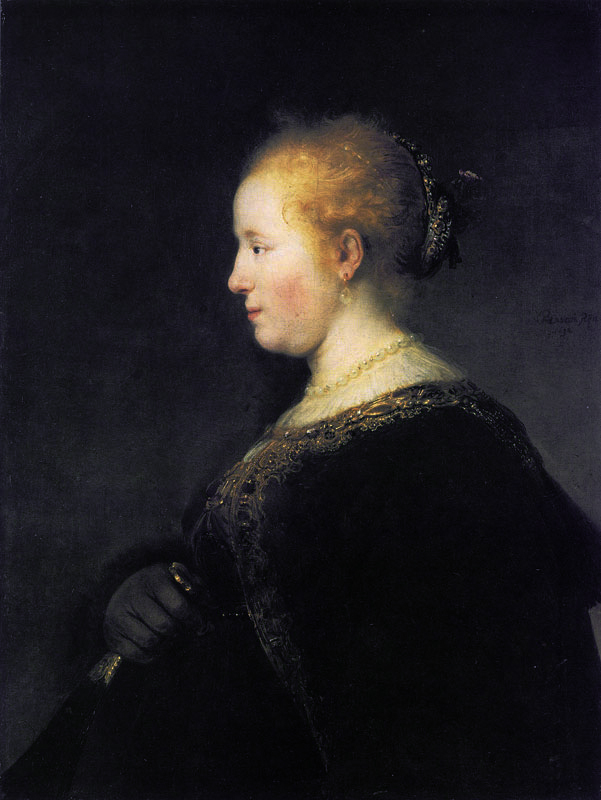
1632

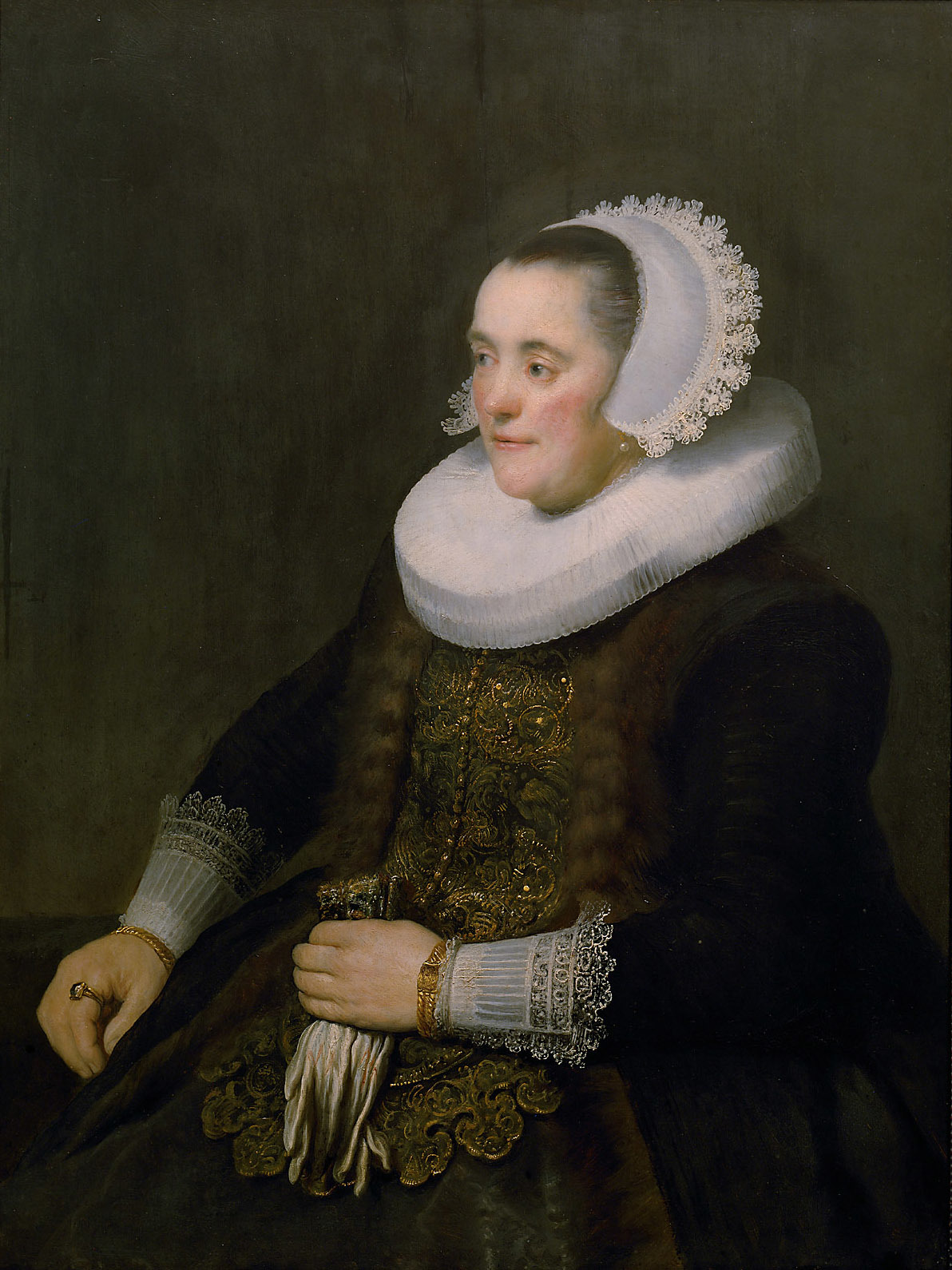
1632

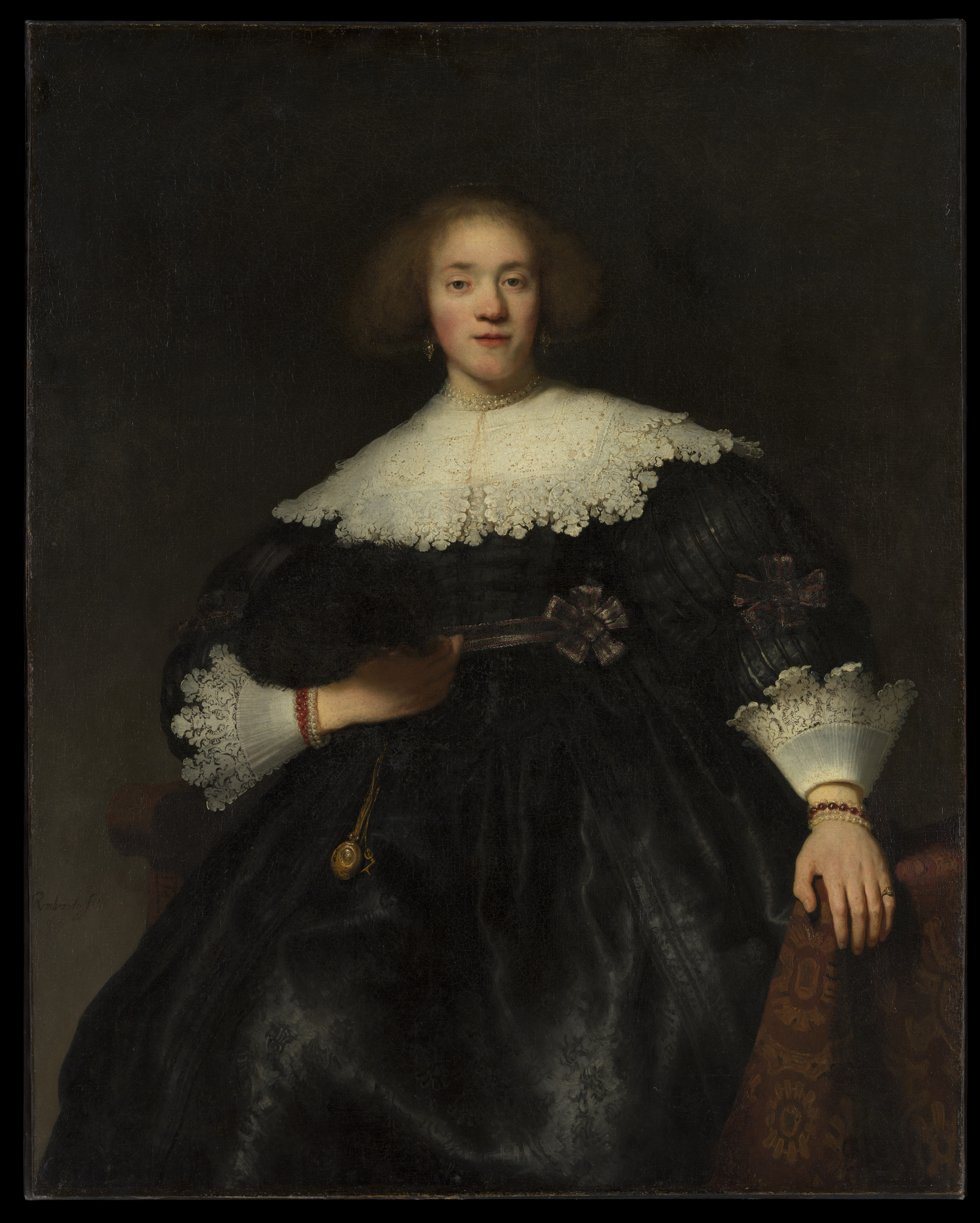
1633

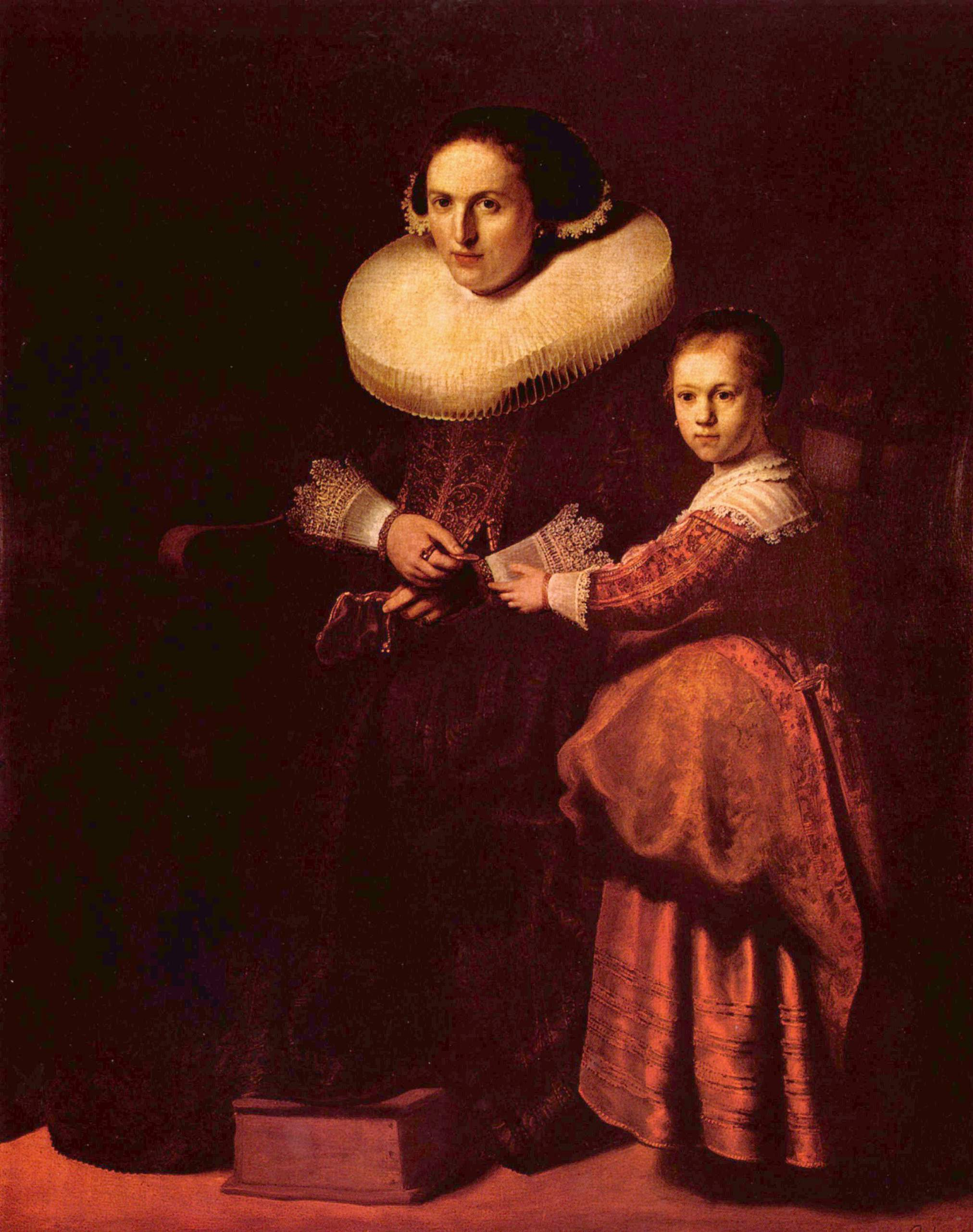
1633

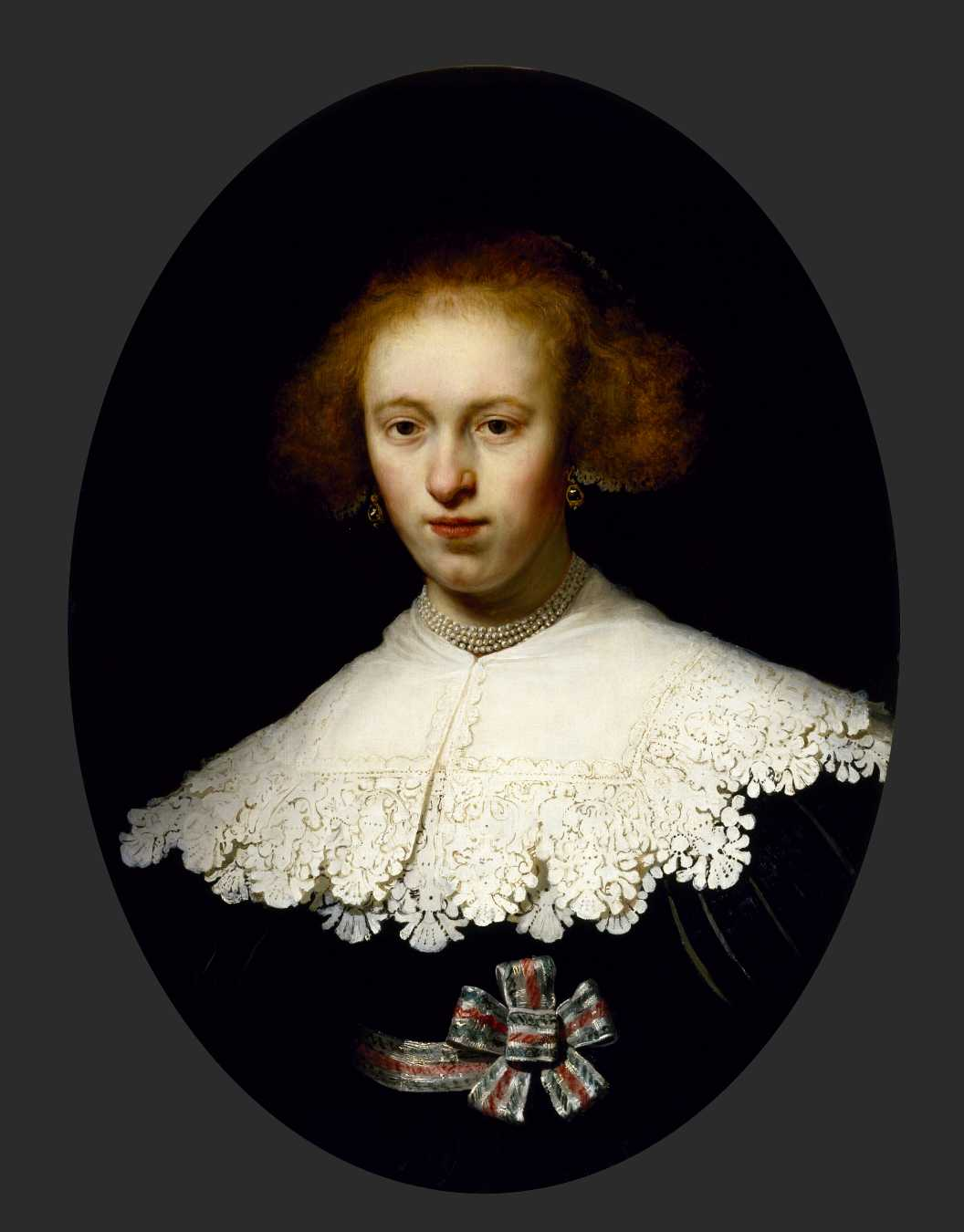
1633

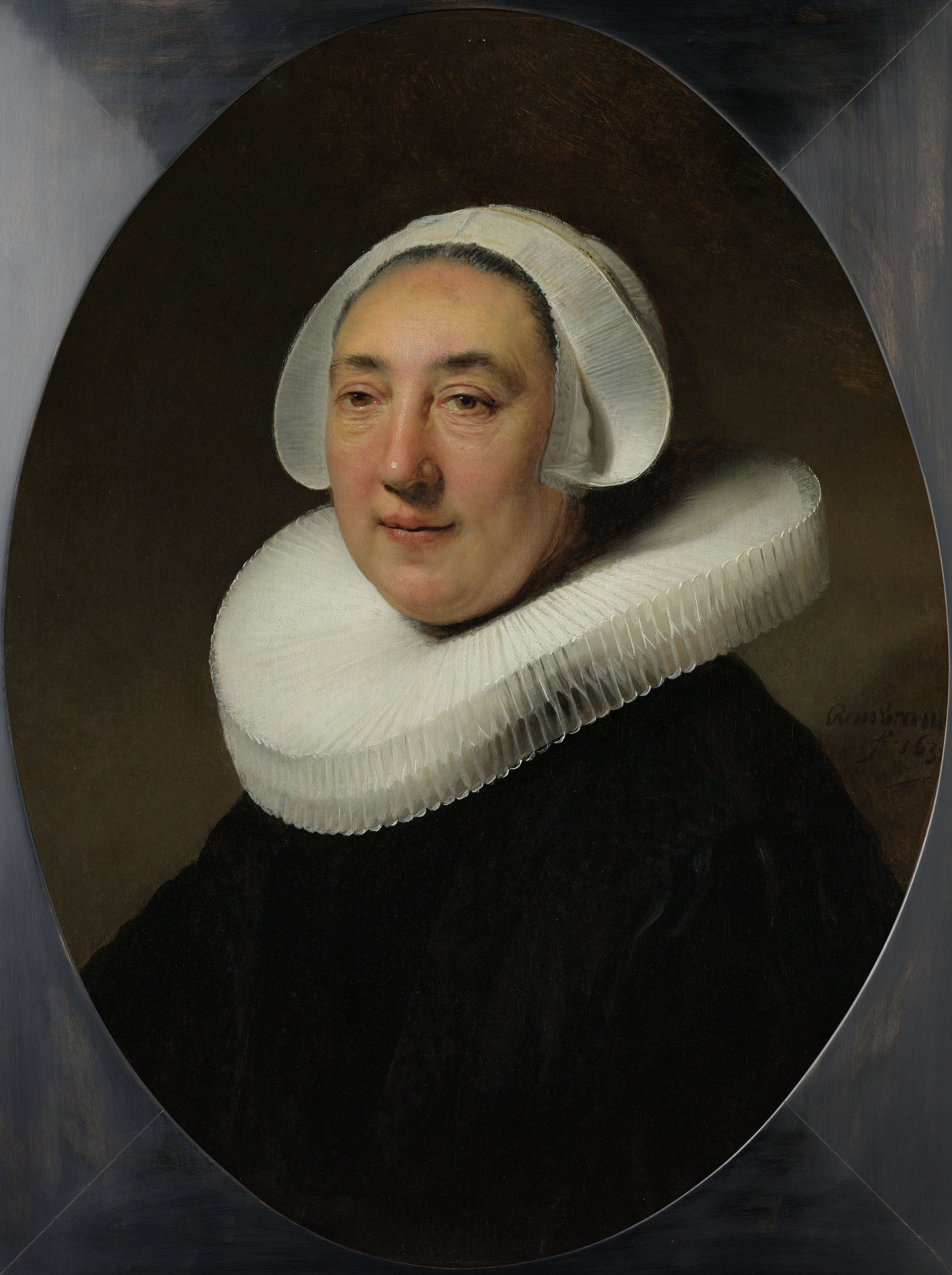
1634

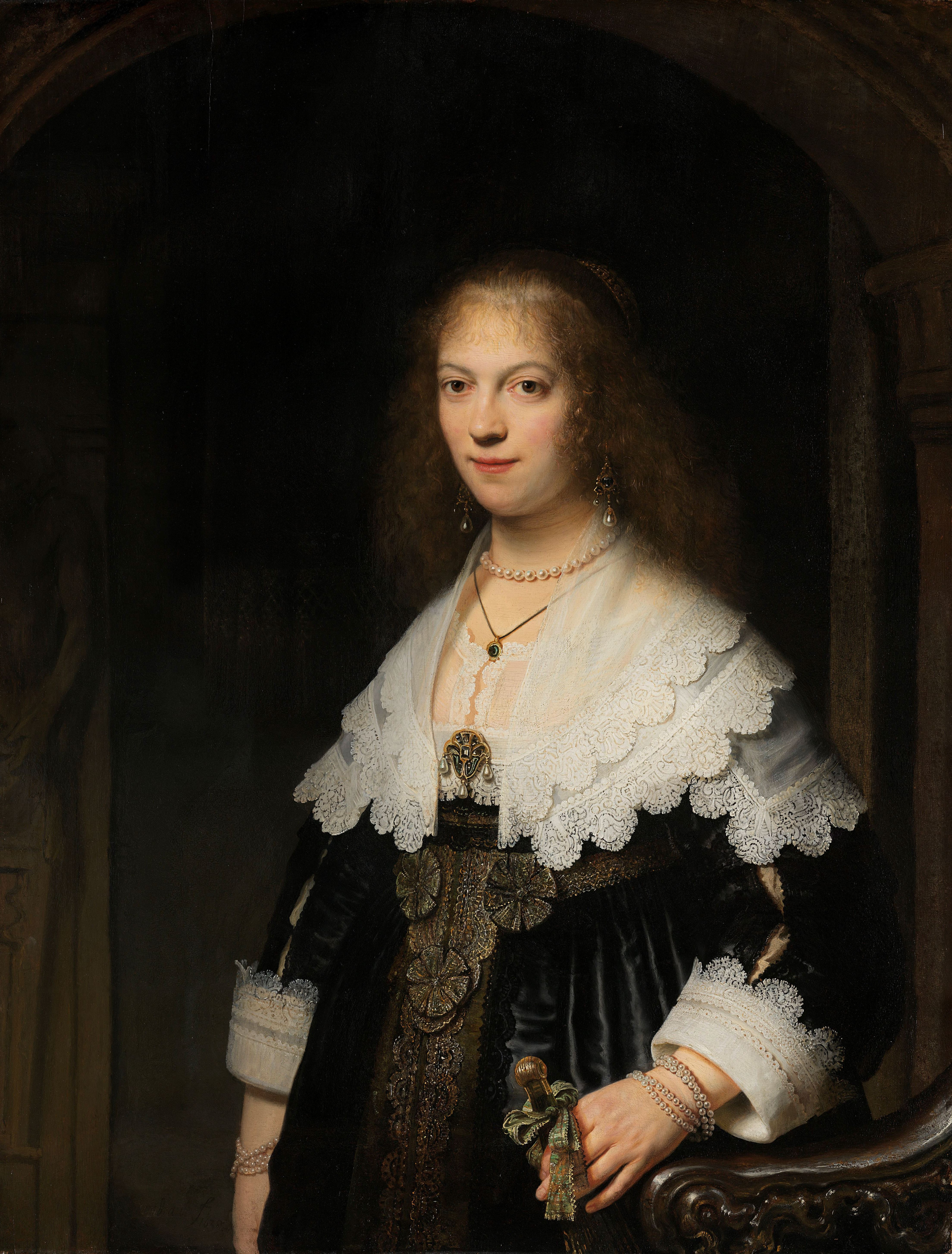
c. 1639

== See also ==
- List of most expensive paintings
- List of paintings by Rembrandt
