= Robert de Rothschild =

French banker, philanthropist and polo player

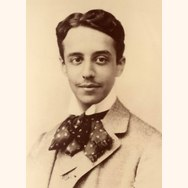
- Born: Robert Philippe Gustave de Rothschild; 19 January 1880; Paris, France
- Died: 25 December 1946 (aged 66); Lausanne, Switzerland
- Occupations: Banker, philanthropist, polo player
- Title: Baron
- Spouse: Gabrielle Nelly Régine Beer (m. 1907)
- Children: Diane de Rothschild (b. 1907); Alain de Rothschild (b. 1910); Cécile de Rothschild (b. 1913); Élie de Rothschild (b. 1917)
- Parent(s): Gustave de Rothschild; Cécile Anspach
- Relatives: James Mayer de Rothschild (paternal grandfather); Guy de Rothschild (nephew)

Baron Robert Philippe Gustave de Rothschild (19 January 1880 – 25 December 1946) was a French banker, philanthropist and polo player.

== Early life ==
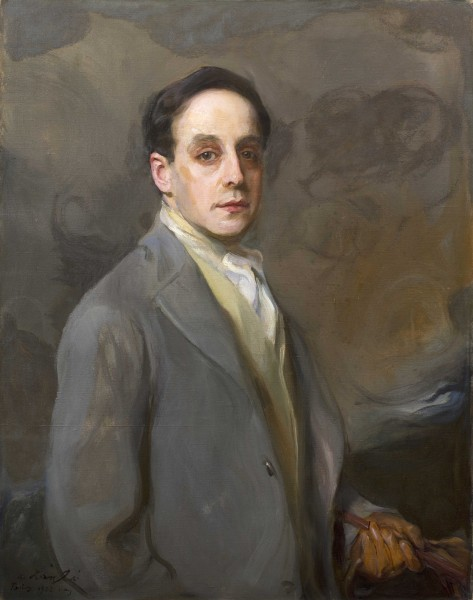
Portrait of Baron de Rothschild by Philip de László, 1911

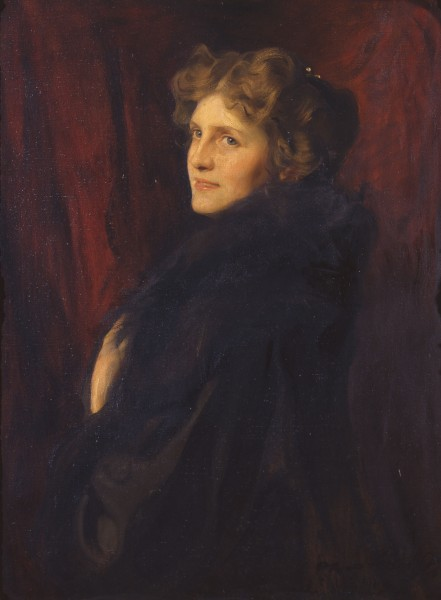
Portrait of his wife, Nelly de Rothschild, by Philip de László, 1913

Robert de Rothschild was born on 19 January 1880 in Paris, France. He was the youngest of six children of banker Baron Gustave de Rothschild, and the former Cécile Anspach. Among his elder siblings were Zoé Lucie Betty de Rothschild (wife of Belgian banker Léon Lambert) and Aline Caroline de Rothschild (who married Sir Edward Sassoon).

== Career ==
He was a banker who supported Jewish causes in France, and later New York City. After the war, he supported efforts to revive Jewish life in France.

During World War II, he was on the Nazi blacklist. Moreover, his French citizenship was nullified by the Vichy government because he was Jewish. He escaped to England and emigrated to the United States, arriving in New York City in August 1940. He stayed there for five years, throughout the war years.

=== Polo ===
He was a four-goal polo player. He was the founder of the Deauville International Polo Club in 1907. He organized the Laversine Open Polo Cup on the grounds of his chateau Laversine in Saint-Maximin. He also organized tournaments in Apremont in 1920. By 1995, the Château de Chantilly in Apremont was home to the Polo Club du Domaine de Chantilly.

He won the International Paris Tournament in 1907 and the Paris Open in 1920.

== Personal life ==
On 6 March 1907, he married Gabrielle Nelly Régine Beer. Together, they resided at the Château de Laversine and had two sons, who were captured by the Nazis and held prisoner during the War, and two daughters:

- Diane Cécile Alice Juliette de Rothschild (1907–1996), who married Anatol Mühlstein in 1932. They divorced after the War and she married Joseph Benvenuti in 1952.
- James Gustave Jules Alain de Rothschild (1910–1982), who married Mary Chauvin du Treuil in 1938.
- Cécile Léonie Eugénie Gudule Lucie de Rothschild (1913–1995), the companion of actress Greta Garbo.
- Élie Robert de Rothschild (1917–2007), who married Liliane Fould-Springer in 1942.

Rothschild died of pneumonia on Christmas Day, 25 December 1946 in Lausanne, Switzerland at age 66.

=== Descendants ===
Through his daughter Diane, he was the grandfather of three: artist Cécile, historian Anka, and pediatric endocrinologist Nathalie. Through his granddaughter Beatrice, he is the great-grandfather of Marie Brandolini d'Adda, née Angliviel de la Baumelle and a great-great-grandfather of Marcantonio Brandolini d'Adda. Through his son Alain de Rothschild, he is the grandfather of Eric de Rothschild and the great-grand-father of Saskia de Rothschild.
