= Château de Laversine =

Château in Saint-Maximin, Oise, France

Coordinates: 49°14′6″N 2°27′8″E

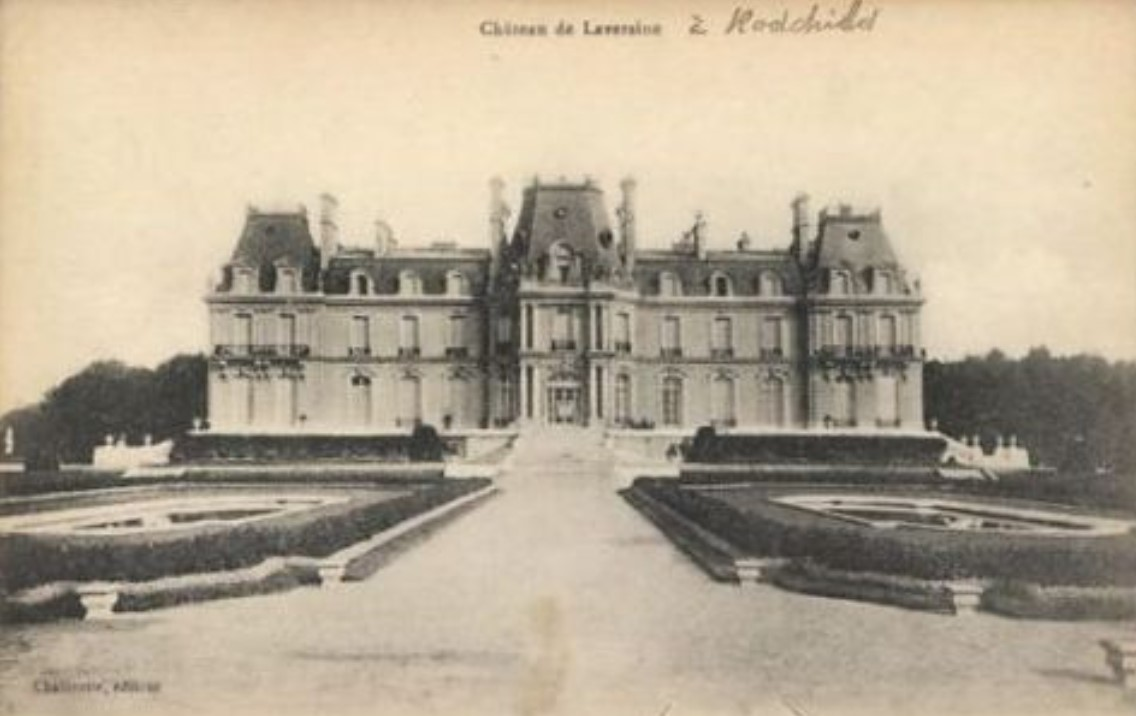
- Interactive map of the Château de Laversine area

General information
- Client: Gustave de Rothschild

Design and construction
- Architect: Alfred-Philibert Aldrophe

The Château de Laversine is a château in Saint-Maximin, Oise, France.

== History ==
The grounds were acquired by Baron Gustave de Rothschild in 1874; a previous castle on the site had been demolished in 1782. Gustave hired Alfred-Philibert Aldrophe, an architect who designed many synagogues in Paris.

It was inherited by his son, Robert de Rothschild, in 1912. A polo player, he turned the grounds into a private polo club. For example, in 1913, the Red Devils team (Count Jean Pastré, Captain J. Jaubert, F. Egan, E. Target) played in the Laversine Open Polo Cup on the grounds of the château. During World War I, he provided hospitality to soldiers.

During World War II, the château was taken by the Nazis. After the war, it was returned to the Rothschilds.

Robert de Rothschild and his wife Nelly donated it to establish a professional lycée for 400 boarders. However, due to lack of refurbishment, all residents had to move out of the château temporarily in 2006. The left wing is home to the Maison d'enfants de Laversine Shatta-et-Bouli-Simon, a non-profit organization for at-risk youth. Since January 2014, the organization has been affiliated with the Œuvre de secours aux enfants.
