= Jackie and Oopjen =

2020 Dutch film

- Film poster
- Directed by: Annemarie van de Mond
- Written by: Myranda Jongeling
- Starring: Frouke Verheijde; Sarah Bannier
- Cinematography: Lex Brand
- Edited by: Jessica de Koning
- Music by: Het Paleis van Boem
- Release date: 8 October 2020
- Running time: 90 minutes
- Country: Netherlands
- Language: Dutch
- Box office: $291,632

Jackie and Oopjen (Dutch: Jackie en Oopjen) is a 2021 Dutch family film. The film premiered at the Mill Valley Film Festival.

== Plot ==
Oopjen Coppit escapes from her painting in the Rijksmuseum in search of her long lost sister.
