= Venice for Lovers =

2005 book by Louis Begley and Anka Muhlstein

- Author: Louis Begley and Anka Muhlstein
- Original title: Venedig Unter Vier Augen
- Translator: Anne Wyburd translated Anka Muhlstein's section Les Clefs de Venise
- Language: German, English, French
- Series: Armchair Traveller
- Genre: Essays, diary
- Publisher: Haus Publishing Ltd, London
- Publication date: 2005
- Publication place: Italy
- Media type: Print (Hardback, pocket format)
- Pages: 216 pp
- ISBN: 978-1-904341-97-0
- OCLC: 61129808
- Dewey Decimal: 914.5/3104 22
- LC Class: DG674.2 .B4413 2005

Venice for Lovers consists of two essays — one by Louis Begley and one by his wife Anka Muhlstein, and a short story by Begley. The essays are about Venice, and the story takes place in Venice.

== Overview ==
Every year for all the 30 years they have been married, the couple spends long, enjoyable months in Venice. They write and live there and over the decades La Serenissima has become their second home. The owners of their favourite restaurants have become their friends and they share the lives of the locals, far off the beaten tourist tracks, as Muhlstein describes in her contribution to this book.

Louis Begley's essay is on the city's place within world literature and discusses works of Henry James, Marcel Proust and Thomas Mann that are set in Venice. Begley's story is about a young man's frustrating love affair in Venice.

Originally written in German and French, the authors revised the English edition, adding extra material. The book is a personal view of a place, which will forever inspire dreams of love and passion.

== Excerpt ==
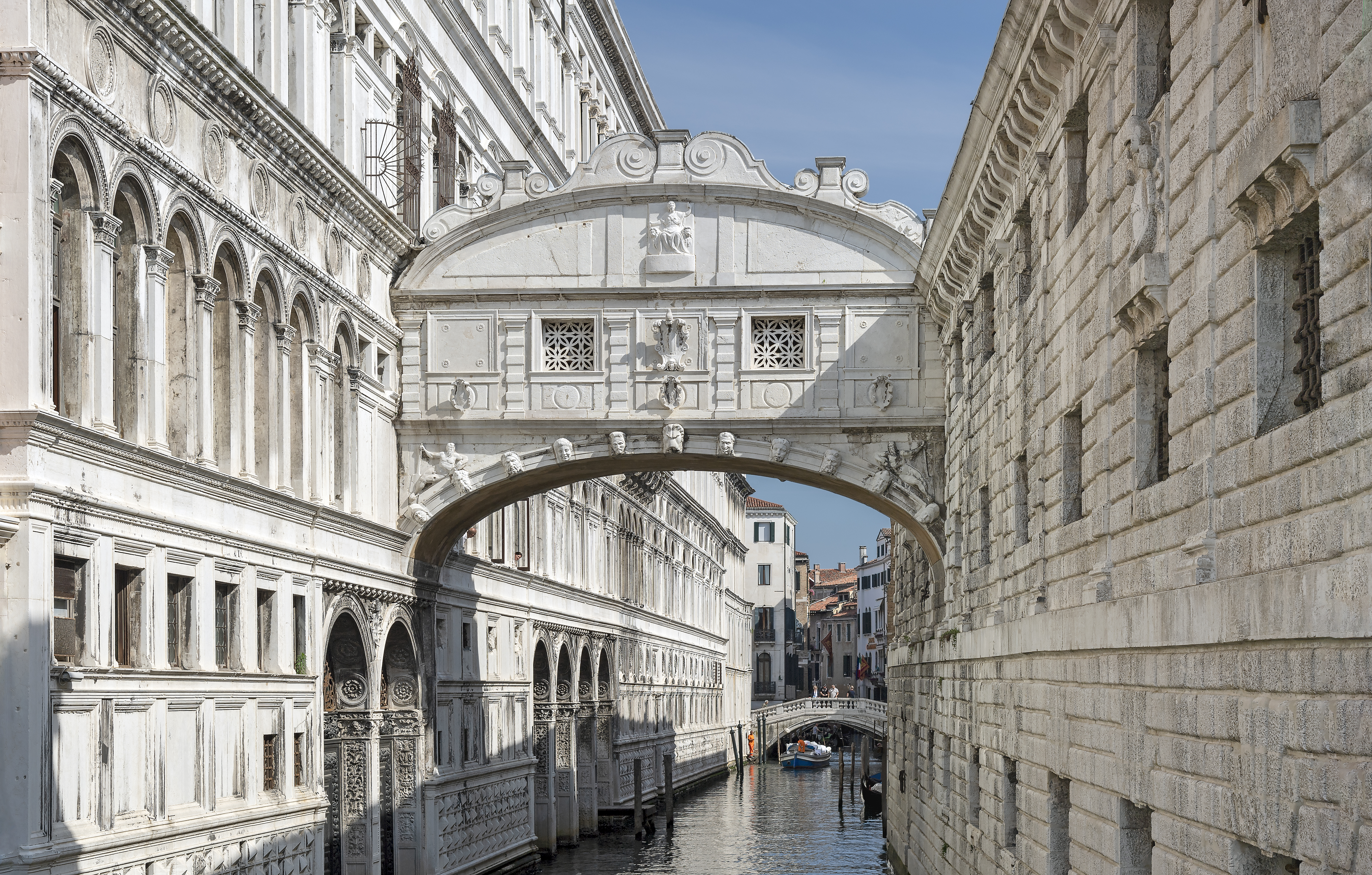
The Ponte dei Sospiri, the "Bridge of Sighs"

The last section of the book is written singlehandedly by Louis Begley and is entitled Venice: Reflections of a Novelist and opens thus:

Venice: It is a great pleasure to write the word, but I am not sure there is not a certain impudence in pretending to add anything to it. Venice has been painted and described many thousands of times, and of all the cities of the world it is the easiest to visit without going there. Open the first book and you will find a rhapsody about it; step into the first picture dealer's and you will find three or four high-coloured "views" of it. There is notoriously nothing more to be said on the subject.

The voice is not mine; it is Henry James's, who famously and fortunately disregarded his own advice by writing again and again about la serenissima. As a novelist, I have obviously disregarded his counsel as well, and I am about to disregard it again now.

...

I have been visiting Venice since 1954. In the 1980s, visits to Venice became an unquestioned annual event, one that my wife and I have come to regard as a fixed part of our lives. The rush of pleasure is just as intense when we first see from the water taxi we boarded at the airport the outline of the city glimmering in the morning haze; we still find that the way we live in Venice goes well with our work. Our painter son who has lived in Rome for many years, and whose knowledge of Venetian calli and rii and sottoporteghi, and of the contents of the sacristies of out-of-the-way churches, is almost as surprising as my wife's, has continued to spend harmonious days with us, organized around lunches and dinners, which we eat late to safeguard the working hours during which we are not to be disturbed. I had the great good luck to get to know the work of Marcel Proust and Thomas Mann long before I first went to Venice: Mann beginning in 1949, when I read Death in Venice, "Mario and the Magician", and "Disorder and Early Sorrow," and Proust's in the spring of 1951, when during one semester I made my way through all of À la recherche du temps perdu. It was also in the early 1950s, although I cannot pinpoint the year, that I began to read Henry James, at first probably some of the stories and perhaps The Turn of the Screw and Washington Square, and later, but while I was still at college, the longer works. Certainly, I had read The Wings of the Dove by the summer of 1954. I have a life-long unshakeable habit of peering at people, events and places through works of fiction I admire, as though they were so many different pairs of glasses, each of which in its own way adjusts my vision. Accordingly, I have no reason to doubt my memory of having looked at Venice from the start as Venice of James and Proust and Mann.

== See also ==
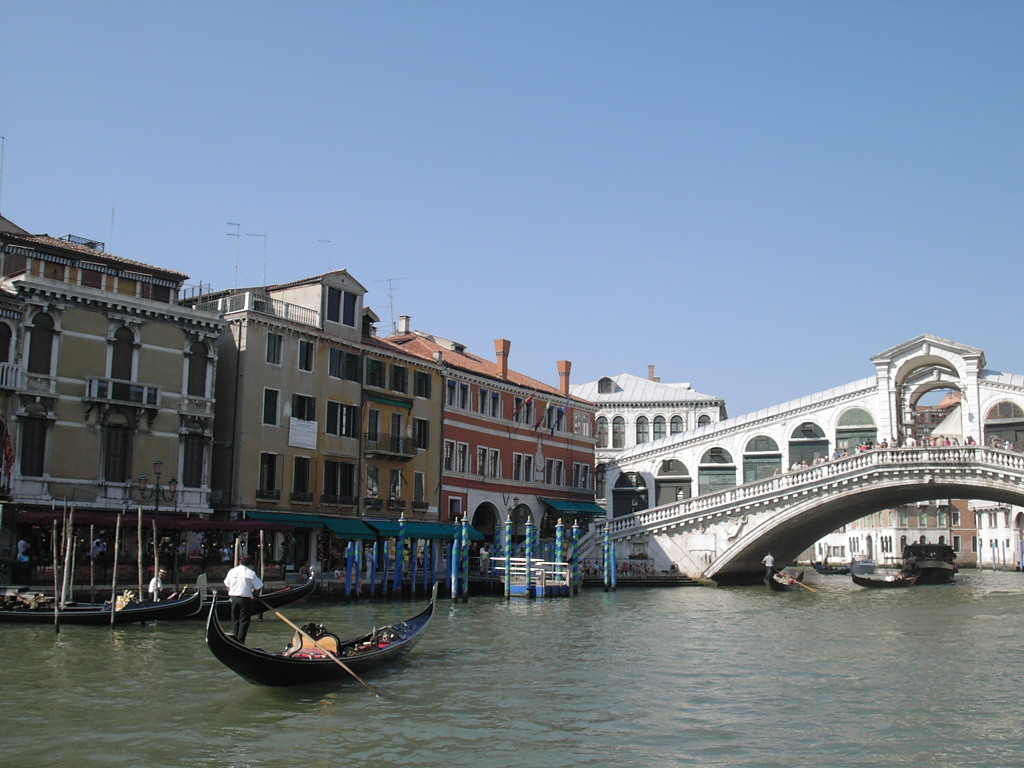
Venice in summer, with the Rialto Bridge in the background

- List of architecture monuments of Venice
- List of painters and architects of Venice
- Su e zo per i ponti
- Veneti and Venetic language (the ancient spoken language of the region)
- Venetian glass
- Venetian language (the modern spoken vernacular of the region)
- Venice Biennale
- Venice Film Festival
- Several European cities have been compared to Venice: The Breton city Nantes has been called The Venice of the West, while the nickname The Venice of the North has been variously applied to Amsterdam, Birmingham, Bornholm, Bruges, Haapsalu, Maryhill, Saint Petersburg and Stockholm.
