= Nathalie Josso =

French paediatric endocrinologist

- Born: Nathalie Mühlstein; 13 January 1934; Paris, France
- Died: 20 November 2022 (aged 88); Paris
- Education: University of Paris; Pierre and Marie Curie University
- Known for: Identifying Anti-Müllerian hormone; Intersex research
- Spouse: François Josso (m. 1959; died 1981)
- Scientific career
- Fields: Pediatric endocrinology
- Workplaces: Necker-Enfant Malades Hospital; Ecole Normale Supérieure; Paris-Sud University

Nathalie Mühlstein Josso (1934–2022) was a pediatric endocrinologist. She studied variations in genital development before birth, including intersex conditions. She was the first to identify anti-Müllerian hormone (AMH), a hormone that is important in the development of male sex in fetuses by suppressing the development of female reproductive organs. Josso also later identified AMH in adult women, enabling the development of tests of ovarian reserve.

== Early life and education ==
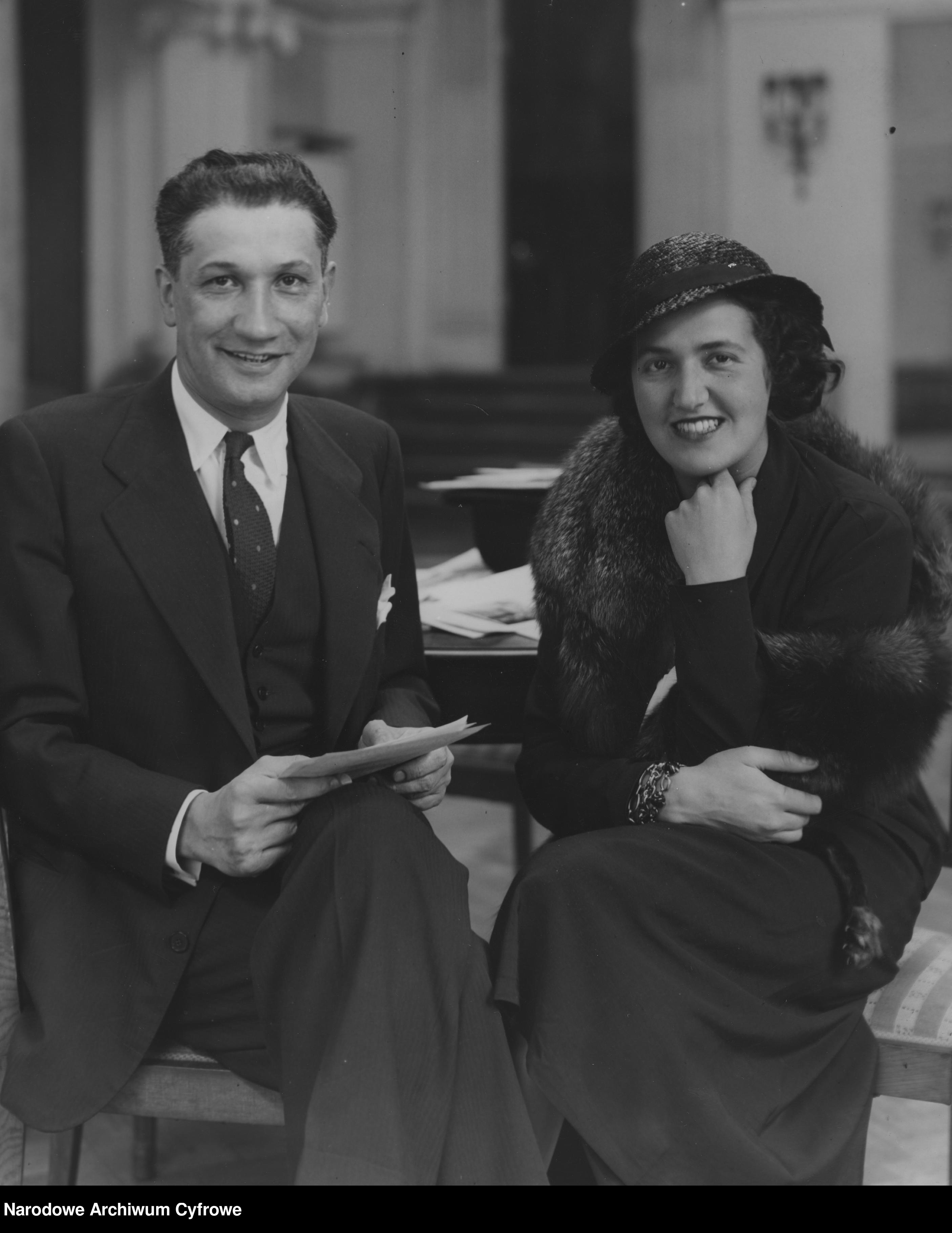
Nathalie's parents, Anatol and Diane Mühlstein, 1932

Nathalie was born on 13 January 1934 in Paris, the oldest of three children. Her younger sisters are historian Anka Mühlstein (born 1935) and artist Cécile (1936–2007). Their mother Diane (1907–1996) was the daughter of Baron Robert de Rothschild. Their father was Anatol Mühlstein (1889–1957). He was the Polish ambassador to France at the time of their parents' marriage in 1932.

The family was Jewish, and as a diplomat, Mühlstein was aware of the dangers his family would face in Nazi-occupied France. He took the family to Lisbon in early June 1940 via Bordeaux, just ahead of France's capitulation. Soon after, the family emigrated to New York. Nathalie was six years old, and she attended school in the U.S., learning English there. At the end of the war, the Mühlsteins returned to Paris. Her parents had divorced.

Nathalie graduated with a degree in medicine from the University of Paris and then specialised in paediatrics and endocrinology. Soon after finishing her residency in paediatrics, Josso decided to pursue a scientific career at INSERM, the French national institute for health and medical research.

== Scientific career ==
Josso's interest in variations in sex development began when an intersex patient was referred to her in the early 1960s. In addition, when she studied endocrinology her professor was Alfred Jost, who had postulated the existence of a hormone other than testosterone that helped determine male sex after a series of experiments in the 1940s. Although Jost had demonstrated there was a further inhibiting hormone or steroid that was not testosterone, he had not been able to identify it.

Josso gained her PhD in 1971 from the Pierre and Marie Curie University, with a dissertation on Wolffian ducts in fetal rats, under Jost's supervision. Josso also spent some time at the University of Cambridge learning organ culture from Ilse Lasnitzki. She wanted to work on discovering Jost's unidentified substance, and moved to do so at a new INSERM laboratory at the Necker-Enfants Malades Hospital, where she had done her paediatric training. After some struggles with experiments, Josso decided to study calf fetal testes, as these were large. By a series of experiments eliminating other sources, she determined that the substance was being produced in the Sertoli cells. Josso and colleagues on her team, Jean-Yves Picard and Bernard Vigier, were able to purify AMH, which she named, between 1971 and 1973. Josso published the results in 1973.

Josso also maintained some clinical work throughout her scientific career. Intersex conditions also continued to be a focus of her scientific work. In 1981, The Intersex Child was published, an extensive overview of research for paediatricians edited by Josso.

In 1986, Josso's team was one of the first two groups to clone bovine AMH, and the gene of its receptor. From 1986 to 1998, Josso was the founding research director for the INSERM developmental endocrinology unit at the Ecole Normale Supérieure. The group's results included the development of a blood test for AMH, and identifying the genetic origin of Persistent Müllerian duct syndrome.

Josso published her second book in 2017, a book for young people on the discovery of AMH, Le sexe des anges: une histoire d'hormones, illustrated by Martine Netter.

== Honours ==
- Lawson Wilkins Memorial Lecture, Baltimore (1975)
- Andrea Prader Prize, European Society for Paediatric Endocrinology (1992)
- World Federation of Societies for Paediatric Urology Progress Medal (2004)

== Personal life ==
Nathalie and professor of haematology François Josso were married from 1959 until his death from cancer in 1981. The couple had three children, one of whom pre-deceased her mother. Her longtime partner after the death of her husband was Robert Gastone. Josso died on 20 November 2022 aged 88, surrounded by family.
