= Anti-Müllerian hormone =

Mammalian protein found in humans

AMH

Identifiers
- Aliases: AMH, MIS, antim, MIF, anti-Mullerian hormone
- External IDs: OMIM: 600957; MGI: 88006; GeneCards: AMH

Gene location (Human)
Chr.	Chromosome 19 (human)
Band	19p13.3	Start	2,249,309 bp
Band	19p13.3	End	2,252,073 bp

Gene location (Mouse)
Chr.	Chromosome 10 (mouse)
Band	10 C1|10 39.72 cM	Start	80,641,077 bp
Band	10 C1|10 39.72 cM	End	80,643,482 bp
RNA expression pattern
Bgee	Human / Mouse (ortholog); Top expressed in: testicle; right hemisphere of cerebellum; right testis; left testis; anterior pituitary; right frontal lobe; nucleus accumbens; putamen; caudate nucleus; gastrocnemius muscle / Top expressed in: epithelium of seminiferous tubule of testis; Sertoli cell; Gonadal ridge; ovarian follicle; ovarian follicle; granulosa cell of ovary; embryo; spermatocyte; granulocyte; neural layer of retina; More reference expression data
BioGPS	n/a
Gene ontology
Molecular function	transforming growth factor beta receptor binding; growth factor activity; signaling receptor binding; hormone activity
Cellular component	extracellular region; extracellular space
Biological process	Mullerian duct regression; cell-cell signaling; cell differentiation; ageing; positive regulation of gene expression; sex differentiation; sex-determination system; positive regulation of NF-kappaB transcription factor activity; response to organic cyclic compound; preantral ovarian follicle growth; gonad development; gonadal mesoderm development; negative regulation of ovarian follicle development; BMP signaling pathway; urogenital system development; regulation of signaling receptor activity
Sources:Amigo / QuickGO
Orthologs
Databases	NCBI: entry; OMA: entry
Species	Human	Mouse
Entrez	268	11705
Ensembl	ENSG00000104899	ENSMUSG00000035262
UniProt	P03971	P27106; Q5EC55
RefSeq (mRNA)	NM_000479	NM_007445
RefSeq (protein)	NP_000470	NP_031471
Location (UCSC)	Chr 19: 2.25 – 2.25 Mb	Chr 10: 80.64 – 80.64 Mb
PubMed search
- Wikidata
View/Edit Human	View/Edit Mouse

Anti-Müllerian hormone (AMH), also known as Müllerian-inhibiting factor (MIF), is a protein that in humans is encoded by the AMH gene.

AMH is a glycoprotein hormone that belongs to the transforming growth factor beta (TGF-β) superfamily, which also includes inhibin and activin. These hormones play important roles in cell growth and development, sex differentiation in males, and the formation of ovarian follicles. In humans, the AMH gene is located on chromosome 19p13.3, while its receptor is encoded by the AMHR2 gene on chromosome 12.

In male embryos, AMH is switched on by the SOX9 gene in Sertoli cells of the developing testes. AMH acts to block the development of the Müllerian ducts (also called paramesonephric ducts), which would otherwise form the uterus, fallopian tubes, and upper part of the vagina. This allows male reproductive organs to develop. The production of AMH during this specific window of fetal development is tightly regulated by other factors, including the nuclear receptor SF-1, GATA transcription factors, the sex-determining gene DAX1, and follicle-stimulating hormone (FSH). Mutations in the AMH gene or its receptor (type II AMH receptor) can result in the persistence of Müllerian duct structures in otherwise normally developed males.

In females, AMH is produced by granulosa cells in developing ovarian follicles, especially in the early (preantral and small antral) stages. AMH is present in the ovaries until menopause. One of its main functions is to regulate how many follicles are recruited from the resting pool, helping to control which one becomes dominant and is selected for ovulation. After this selection, AMH levels in that follicle drop. Because AMH is secreted by granulosa cells, which support and nourish the developing egg, its levels in the blood can be used as a marker to estimate a woman's ovarian reserve, or the number of remaining eggs. In cattle, AMH can be used to predict how many follicles a cow will develop for embryo transfer, helping select the best animals for breeding programs. AMH is also studied as a diagnostic marker for ovarian disorders, such as polyendocrine metabolic ovarian syndrome (PMOS).

== Structure ==
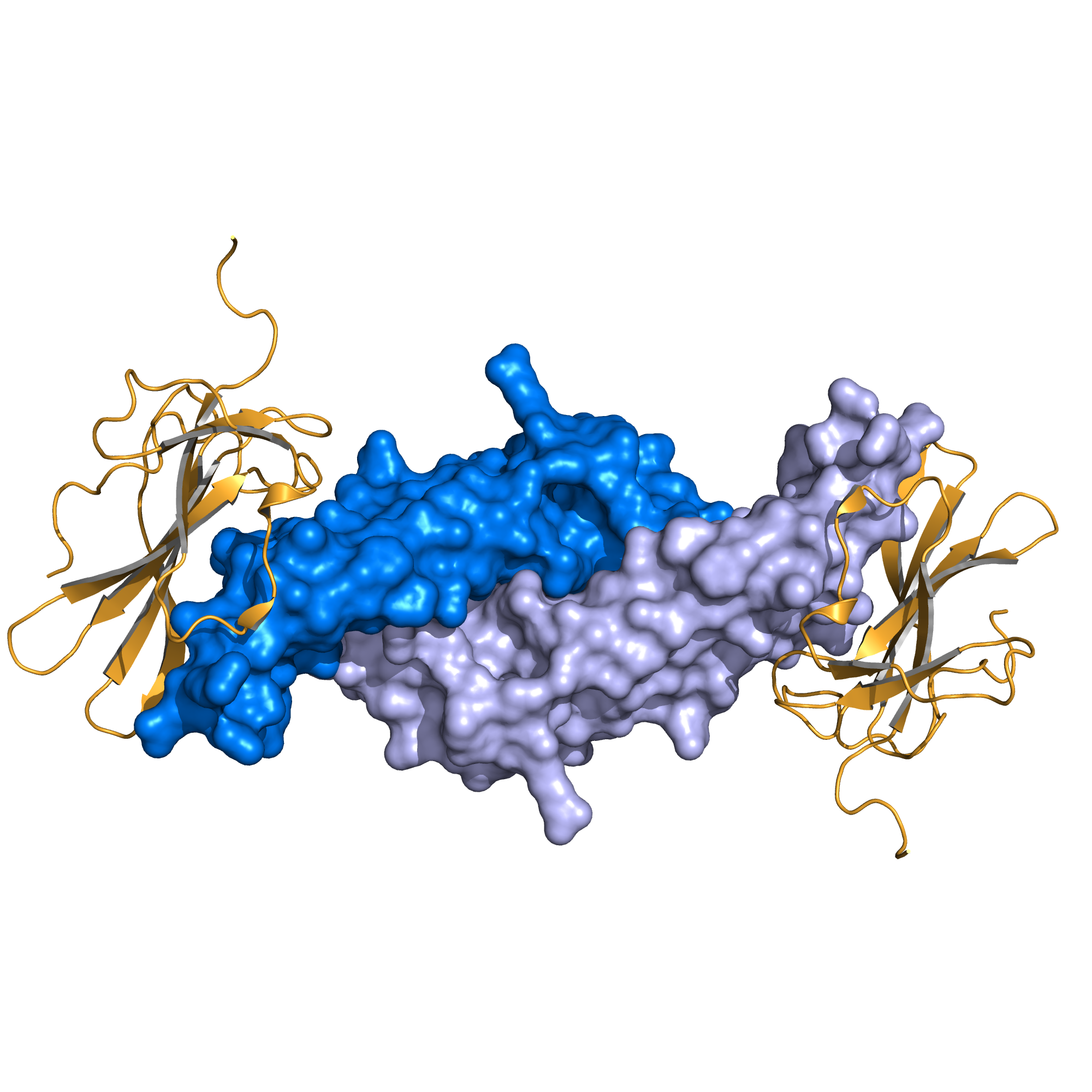
AMH bound to its type II receptor, AMHR2 (PDB: 7L0J)

AMH is a dimeric glycoprotein with a molar mass of 140 kDa. The molecule consists of two identical subunits linked by sulfide bridges, and characterized by the N-terminal dimer (pro-region) and C-terminal dimer. AMH binds to its Type 2 receptor AMHR2, which phosphorylates a type I receptor under the TGF beta signaling pathway.

== Function ==
=== Embryogenesis ===
In male mammals, AMH prevents the development of the Müllerian ducts into the uterus and other Müllerian structures. The effect is ipsilateral, that is each testis suppresses Müllerian development only on its own side. If no hormone is produced from the gonads, the Müllerian will develop thanks to the presence of Wnt4, while the Wolffian ducts, which are responsible for male reproductive parts, will die due to the presence of COUP-TFII. Amounts of AMH that are measurable in the blood vary by age and sex. AMH works by interacting with specific receptors on the surfaces of the cells of target tissues (anti-Müllerian hormone receptors). The best-known and most specific effect, mediated through the AMH type II receptors, includes programmed cell death (apoptosis) of the target tissue (the fetal Müllerian ducts).

Phylogenetically, the amh gene first appears among cartilaginous fishes in line with the appearance of paired Müllerian ducts. In teleost fishes, there is no Müllerian duct, as male and female both develop gonoducts as a posterior extension of the gonads. Despite this, amh is expressed. During embryo development, the undifferentiated gonads express amh expression at low and equal levels for both sexes. Later, in males, amh expression increases and remains high during and after puberty in adults. In the female chicken embryo, the right duct and the right gonad regresses, both mediated by AMH, but the left duct remains, likely protected by estrogen.

=== Ovarian ===
AMH is produced by granulosa cells from pre-antral and antral follicles, restricting expression to growing follicles, until they have reached the size and differentiation state at which they are selected for dominance by the action of pituitary FSH. Ovarian AMH expression has been observed as early as 36 weeks' gestation in the humans' fetus. AMH expression is greatest in the recruitment stage of folliculogenesis, in the preantral and small antral follicles. This expression diminishes as follicles develop and enter selection stage, upon which FSH expression increases. Some authorities suggest it is a measure of certain aspects of ovarian function, useful in assessing conditions such as polyendocrine metabolic ovarian syndrome and premature ovarian failure.

=== Other ===
AMH production by the Sertoli cells of the testes remains high throughout childhood in males but declines to low levels during puberty and adult life. AMH has been shown to regulate production of sex hormones, and changing AMH levels (rising in females, falling in males) may be involved in the onset of puberty in both sexes. Functional AMH receptors have also been found to be expressed in neurons in the brains of embryonic mice, and are thought to play a role in sexually dimorphic brain development and consequent development of sex-specific behaviours. In a clade of Sebastes rockfishes in the Northwest Pacific Ocean, a duplicated copy of the AMH gene (called AMHY) is the master sex-determining gene. In vitro experiments demonstrate that the overexpression of AMHY causes female-to-male sex reversal in at least one species, S. schlegelii.

== Pathology ==
In males, inadequate embryonal AMH activity can lead to persistent Müllerian duct syndrome (PMDS), in which a rudimentary uterus is present and testes are usually undescended. The AMH gene (AMH) or the gene for its receptor (AMH-RII) are usually abnormal. AMH measurements have also become widely used in the evaluation of testicular presence and function in infants with intersex variations, ambiguous genitalia, and cryptorchidism.

Female offspring of pregnant mice injected with AMH develop polyendocrine metabolic ovarian syndrome (PMOS)-like symptoms, including infertility, delayed puberty, and erratic ovulation. Injection of GnRH antagonist cetrorelix prevents the appearance of reproductive defects in this context. This implies excess of AMH may cause PMOS through GnRH signaling.

== Blood levels ==
In healthy females AMH is either just detectable or undetectable in cord blood at birth and demonstrates a marked rise by three months of age; while still detectable it falls until four years of age before rising linearly until eight years of age remaining fairly constant from mid-childhood to early adulthood – it does not change significantly during puberty. The rise during childhood and adolescence is likely reflective of different stages of follicle development. From 25 years of age AMH declines to undetectable levels at menopause.

The standard measurement of AMH follows the Generation II assay. This should give the same values as the previously used IBC assay, but AMH values from the previously used DSL assay should be multiplied with 1.39 to conform to current standards because it used different antibodies.

Weak evidence suggests that AMH should be measured only in the early follicular phase because of variation over the menstrual cycle. Also, AMH levels decrease under current use of oral contraceptives and current tobacco smoking.

=== Reference ranges ===
Reference ranges for anti-Müllerian hormone, as estimated from reference groups in the United States, are as follows:

Females:

Age	Unit	Value
Younger than 24 months	ng/mL	Less than 5
Younger than 24 months	pmol/L	Less than 35
24 months to 12 years	ng/mL	Less than 10
24 months to 12 years	pmol/L	Less than 70
13–45 years	ng/mL	1 to 10
13–45 years	pmol/L	7 to 70
More than 45 years	ng/mL	Less than 1
More than 45 years	pmol/L	Less than 7

Males:

Age	Unit	Value
Younger than 24 months	ng/mL	15 to 500
Younger than 24 months	pmol/L	100 to 3500
24 months to 12 years	ng/mL	7 to 240
24 months to 12 years	pmol/L	50 to 1700
More than 12 years	ng/mL	0.7 to 20
More than 12 years	pmol/L	5 to 140

AMH measurements may be less accurate if the person being measured is vitamin D deficient. Note that males are born with higher AMH levels than females in order to initiate sexual differentiation, and in women, AMH levels decrease over time as fertility decreases as well.

== Clinical usage ==
=== General fertility assessment ===
Comparison of an individual's AMH level with respect to average levels is useful in fertility assessment, as it provides a guide to ovarian reserve. Because one's AMH level cannot be altered by any external factors, it helps identify whether a woman needs to consider either egg freezing or trying for a pregnancy sooner rather than later if their long-term future fertility is poor. A higher level of anti-Müllerian hormone when tested in women in the general population has been found to have a positive correlation with natural fertility in women aged 30–44 aiming to conceive spontaneously, even after adjusting for age. However, this correlation was not found in a comparable study of younger women (aged 20 to 30 years).

=== In vitro fertilization ===
AMH is a predictor for ovarian response in in vitro fertilization (IVF). Measurement of AMH supports clinical decisions, but alone it is not a strong predictor of IVF success. Women with lower levels of AMH are still able to get pregnant. Additionally, AMH levels are used to estimate a woman's remaining egg supply.

According to NICE guidelines of in vitro fertilization, an anti-Müllerian hormone level of less than or equal to 5.4 pmol/L (0.8 ng/mL) predicts a low response to gonadotrophin stimulation in IVF, while a level greater than or equal to 25.0 pmol/L (3.6 ng/mL) predicts a high response. Other cut-off values found in the literature vary between 0.7 and 20 pmol/L (0.1 and 2.97 ng/mL) for low response to ovarian hyperstimulation. Subsequently, higher AMH levels are associated with greater chance of live birth after IVF, even after adjusting for age. AMH can thereby be used to rationalise the programme of ovulation induction and decisions about the number of embryos to transfer in assisted reproduction techniques to maximise pregnancy success rates whilst minimising the risk of ovarian hyperstimulation syndrome (OHSS). AMH can predict an excessive response in ovarian hyperstimulation with a sensitivity and specificity of 82% and 76%, respectively.

Measuring AMH alone may be misleading as high levels occur in conditions like polyendocrine metabolic ovarian syndrome and therefore AMH levels should be considered in conjunction with a transvaginal scan of the ovaries to assess antral follicle count and ovarian volume.

=== Natural remedies ===
Studies into treatments to improve low ovarian reserve and low AMH levels have met with some success. Current best available evidence suggests that DHEA improves ovarian function, increases pregnancy chances and, by reducing aneuploidy, lowers miscarriage rates. The studies into DHEA for low AMH show that a dose of 75 mg for a period of 16 weeks should be taken. Improvement of oocyte/embryo quality with DHEA supplementation potentially suggests a new concept of ovarian aging, where ovarian environments, but not oocytes themselves, age. DHEA has positive outcomes for women with AMH levels over 0.8 ng/mL or 5.7 pmol/L. DHEA has no apparent effect on oocytes or ovarian environments under this range.

Studies have demonstrated a decline in CoQ levels with age. Studies on CoQ10 supplementation in an aged animal model delayed depletion of ovarian reserve, restored oocyte mitochondrial gene expression, and improved mitochondrial activity. Therefore, CoQ10 is used as a stimulator of the mitochondrial ATP formation in the electron transport chain when it's naturally deficient in ovarian aged patients. Authors note that to replicate the 12–16 weeks of using CoQ10 supplements on mice to achieve these results would be the equivalent to a decade in humans.

Vitamin D is believed to play a role in AMH regulation. The AMH gene promoter contains a vitamin D response element that may cause vitamin D status to influence serum AMH levels. Women with levels of vitamin D of 267.8 ± 66.4 nmol/L show a 4 times better success rate with IVF procedure than those with low levels of 104.3 ± 21 nmol/L. Vitamin D deficiency should be considered when serum AMH levels are obtained for diagnosis.

=== Women with cancer ===
In women with cancer, radiation therapy and chemotherapy can damage the ovarian reserve. In such cases, a pre-treatment AMH is useful in predicting the long-term post-chemotherapy loss of ovarian function, which may indicate fertility preservation strategies such as oocyte cryopreservation. A post-treatment AMH is associated with decreased fertility.

Granulosa cell tumors of the ovary secrete AMH, and AMH testing has a sensitivity ranging between 76 and 93% in diagnosing such tumors. AMH is also useful in diagnosing recurrence of granulosa cell tumors.

=== Neutering status in animals ===
In veterinary medicine, AMH measurements are used to determine neutering status in male and female dogs and cats. AMH levels can also be used to diagnose cases of ovarian remnant syndrome.

=== Biomarker of polyendocrine metabolic ovarian syndrome ===
Polyendocrine metabolic ovarian syndrome (PMOS), previously called polycystic ovarian syndrome (PCOS), is an endocrine disorder most commonly found in women of reproductive age that is characterized by oligo- or anovulation, hyperandrogenism, and polycystic ovaries (PCO). This endocrine disorder increases AMH levels at nearly two to three times higher in women with PMOS than in normal type women. This is often attributed to the increased follicle count number characteristic of PMOS, indicating an increase in granulosa cells since they surround each individual egg. However, increased AMH levels have also been attributed not just to the increased number of follicles, but also to an increased amount of AMH produced per follicle. The high levels of androgens, characteristic of PMOS, also stimulate and provide feedback for increased production of AMH, as well. In this way, AMH has been increasingly considered to be a tool or biomarker that can be used to diagnose or indicate PMOS.

=== Biomarker of Turner syndrome ===
Turner syndrome is the most common sex chromosome-related inherited diseases in females around the world, with the incidence of 1 in 2000 live female births. One of the significant pathological features is the premature ovarian failure, leading to amenorrhea or even infertility. Follicle stimulating hormone and inhibin B were recommended to be monitored routinely by specialists to speculate the condition of ovary. Recently, anti-Müllerian hormone is advised as a more accurate biomarker for follicular development by several researchers. The biological function of anti-Müllerian hormone in ovary is to counteract the recruitment of primordial follicles triggered by FSH, reserving the follicle pool for further recruitment and ovulation. When menopause takes place, the serum concentration of anti-Müllerian hormone will be nearly undetectable among normal women. Thus, variations in AMH levels during childhood may theoretically predict the duration of any given girl's reproductive life span, assuming that the speed of the continuous follicle loss is comparable between individuals.

=== Potential future usage ===
AMH has been synthesized. Its ability to inhibit growth of tissue derived from the Müllerian ducts has raised hopes of usefulness in the treatment of a variety of medical conditions including endometriosis, adenomyosis, and uterine cancer. Research is underway in several laboratories. If there were more standardized AMH assays, it could potentially be used as a biomarker of polyendocrine metabolic ovarian syndrome.

In mice, an increase in AMH has been shown to reduce the number of growing follicles and thus the overall size of the ovaries. This increase in AMH production reduces primary, secondary and antral follicles without reducing the number of primordial follicles suggesting a blockade of primordial follicle activation. This may provide a viable method of contraception which protects the ovarian reserve of oocytes during chemotherapy without extracting them from the body allowing the potential for natural reproduction later in life.

== Names ==
The adjective Müllerian is written either Müllerian or müllerian, depending on the governing style guide; the derived term with the prefix anti- is then anti-Müllerian, anti-müllerian, or antimüllerian. The Müllerian ducts are named after Johannes Peter Müller.

A list of the names that have been used for the antimüllerian hormone is as follows. For the sake of simplicity, this list ignores some orthographic variations; for example, it gives only one row for "Müllerian-inhibiting hormone", although there are four acceptable stylings thereof (capital M or lowercase m, hyphen or space).

Protein name styling	Protein symbol
Anti-Müllerian hormone	AMH
Müllerian-inhibiting factor	MIF
Müllerian-inhibiting hormone	MIH
Müllerian-inhibiting substance	MIS
Müllerian duct inhibitory factor	MDIF
Müllerian regression factor	MRF
Anti-paramesonephric hormone	APH

== See also ==
- Alfred Jost – first postulated the existence of a non-testesterone substance that suppressed Müllerian hormone
- Nathalie Josso – discovered and named AMH
- Anti-Müllerian hormone receptor
- Freemartin – involvement of anti-Müllerian hormone in cattle twins of mixed sex
- Persistent Müllerian duct syndrome (PMDS)
- Sexual differentiation
