= Louis Begley =

Polish–American novelist (born 1933)

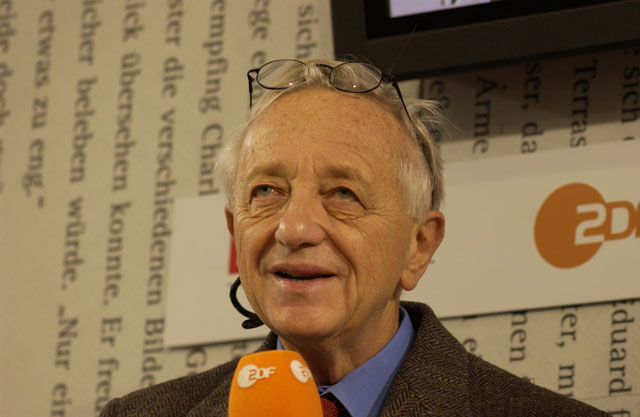
- Begley in 2003
- Born: Ludwik Begleiter; October 6, 1933 (age 92); Stryj, Poland
- Spouses: Sally Higginson (m. 1956; div. 1970) Anka Muhlstein (m. 1974)
- Children: 3 (including Adam Begley)
- Website: https://www.louisbegley.com

Louis Begley (born Ludwik Begleiter; October 6, 1933) is a Polish-American novelist. He is best known for writing the semi-autobiographical Holocaust novel Wartime Lies (1991) and the Schmidt trilogy: About Schmidt (1996), Schmidt Delivered (2000) and Schmidt Steps Back (2012).

== Life ==
=== Early life ===
Begley was born Ludwik Begleiter in Stryi, then part of the Polish Republic and now in Ukraine, the only child of a physician. Using forged identity papers that enabled them to pretend to be Polish Catholics, he and his mother survived the Nazi occupation in which many Polish Jews were killed.

He lived with his mother at first in Lwów, and then in Warsaw until the end of the August 1944 Warsaw Uprising. By the time World War II ended, they were in Kraków, where they were reunited with Begley's father.

During the school year 1945/46, Begley attended the Jan Sobieski school in Kraków. It was his first experience of formal instruction since kindergarten during the Soviet occupation of Stryi, which followed the German invasion of western Poland in 1939.

The family left Poland in the fall of 1946 for Paris and, in late February 1947, left Paris for New York City, arriving on March 3. Shortly afterward, the family name was changed from Begleiter to Begley. After graduating from Erasmus Hall High School, Begley studied English literature at Harvard College (AB '54, summa cum laude), where he worked at The Advocate, an undergraduate literary magazine. Service in the United States Army followed, the last 18 months of it in Göppingen, Germany, with the 9th Division.

=== Family ===
In 1956, Begley married Sally Higginson (1928–2017). They divorced in May 1970. In March 1974, Begley married his present wife, Anka Muhlstein, a historian and biographer born in Paris. Begley has three children: painter and sculptor Peter Begley, writer Adam Begley, and novelist and art historian Amey Larmore (who writes under the pen name Laura Moore). He also has two stepsons from Muhlstein's previous marriage: Robert Dujarric, the director of the Institute for Contemporary Japanese Studies at Temple University Japan Campus in Tokyo, and Stéphane Dujarric, the chief spokesman for United Nations Secretary-General Ban Ki-moon.

== Career ==
=== Lawyer ===
In 1956 Begley entered Harvard Law School. Upon his graduation in 1959 (LL.B. magna cum laude), he joined the New York firm now known as Debevoise & Plimpton as an associate. He became a partner January 1, 1968, while serving at the newly established Paris office. Upon his return to New York, Begley headed the firm's international practice for many years, his work being concentrated on large projects in Australia, Algeria, Latin America, Canada and Europe, for Japanese, European and Brazilian as well as American clients. He retired from the firm on January 1, 2004.

=== Novels ===
Begley's first novel, Wartime Lies, was based on his childhood as a Polish Jew who escaped the Nazi death camps. It won the Hemingway Foundation/PEN Award in 1991 and the Prix Médicis étranger in 1992. There have been attempts to adapt it into a film by Stanley Kubrick and William Monahan, but as of 2005 this has not come to fruition.

Begley's 1996 novel About Schmidt was the basis for the eponymous 2002 film by Alexander Payne. Payne made many changes from the book, though Begley commented in an essay in The New York Times that "my most important themes were treated with great intelligence and sensitivity" and felt the movie was "a gem of original filmmaking."

Begley's first nine novels have been published by Alfred A. Knopf, and republished by Ballantine Publishing Company. His most recent works have been published as hardcover by Nan A. Talese and reissued as paperback by Ballantine Publishing Company. His novels have been translated into fifteen languages.

=== Non-fiction ===
In 2001, a selection of Begley's essays and journalistic pieces was published by Suhrkamp Verlag (Frankfurt) under the title Das Gelobte Land.

Venedig Unter Vier Augen, a book on Venetian themes by Anka Muhlstein and Louis Begley, was published in 2003 by Marebuch Verlag (Hamburg). It was also published in English in 2005 by Haus Publishing under the title Venice for Lovers, and reissued under the same title by Grove Press in the U.S..

Zwischen Fakten und Fiktionen, the text of Begley's lectures given as part of Poetik Dozentur at Heidelberg University in November 2006, was published by Suhrkamp in January 2008.

The Tremendous World I Have Inside My Head, Franz Kafka: A Biographical Essay was published by Atlas & Co. in 2008.

Why the Dreyfus Affair Matters was published by Yale University Press in 2009.

== Awards ==
Prizes and awards include: The Irish Times-Aer Lingus International Fiction Prize, National Book Award Finalist, National Book Critics’ Circle Finalist, PEN/Ernest Hemingway Foundation Award, Prix Médicis Étranger, Jeanette-Schocken-Pries, Bremerhavener Bürgerpreis für Literatur, American Academy of Letters Award in Literature, and Konrad Adenauer-Stiftung Literaturpreis.

== Other distinctions ==
From 1993 to 1995, Begley was president of PEN American Center. He served on PEN's board of directors from 1992 to 2001.

He is a member of the American Philosophical Society and the American Academy of Arts and Letters.

He is a Chevalier de L’Ordre des Arts et Lettres Philosophical Society, and a member of the American Philosophical Society and the American Academy of Arts and Letters.

The University of Heidelberg conferred on him in 2008 the degree of D.Phil., honoris causa.

== Bibliography ==
- Wartime Lies (1991)
- The Man Who Was Late (1993)
- As Max Saw It (1994)
- About Schmidt (1996), basis for the 2002 film of the same name
- Mistler's Exit (1998)
- Schmidt Delivered (2000)
- Shipwreck (2003)
- Matters of Honor (2007)
- Schmidt Steps Back (2012)
- Memories of a Marriage (2013)
- Killer, Come Hither (2015)
- Kill and Be Killed (2016)
- Killer's Choice (2019)
- New Life of Hugo Gardner (2020)
