= Wartime Lies =

1991 novel by Louis Begley

- First hardcover edition
- Author: Louis Begley
- Language: English
- Genre: Autobiographical
- Publisher: Knopf
- Publication date: 1991
- Publication place: United States
- Pages: 198 pp
- ISBN: 0-679-40016-8

Wartime Lies is a semi-autobiographical novel by Louis Begley first published in 1991. Set in Poland during the years of the Nazi occupation, it is about two members of an upper middle class Jewish family, a young woman and her nephew, who avoid persecution as Jews by assuming Catholic identities. Time and again the boy, who narrates the story from some remote point in time, reminisces about how he learned to lie at an early age in order to survive. Thus, his whole adult life is founded on the "wartime lies" of his childhood.

Wartime Lies won the Hemingway Foundation/PEN Award in 1991. The French version, Une éducation polonaise, won the Prix Médicis étranger in 1992.

== Plot summary ==
Maciek and his aunt Tania are Polish Jews during World War II. By getting Aryan papers, they elude arrest. In parallel, we follow Maciek, now fifty years old and struck by the tragedy of the consequences of a lying childhood turning the rest of his life into an ongoing fiction.

== Film adaptations ==
In 1976, director Stanley Kubrick approached Isaac Bashevis Singer, Nobel Prize in Literature winner of 1978, to write a screenplay about the Holocaust; he declined with, "I don't know the first thing" about it. The project was put on hold until the publication of Begley's book in 1991. In 1993 Warner Brothers green-lit the film under the title "Aryan Papers", the screenplay written by Kubrick. Uma Thurman was approached to play the lead. When it became known that Steven Spielberg's similar-themed movie Schindler's List would be a competitor at the box office at release time, the project was stopped with many roles having already been cast: Joseph Mazzello as the nephew, Johanna ter Steege in the lead role, Elemér Ragályi designated as cinematographer. Independent of these circumstances, Christiane Kubrick, his wife, remarked that working on the movie took a huge toll on Kubrick, putting him in a very depressed emotional state.

In 2005, William Monahan was hired to adapt Wartime Lies for Warner Independent Pictures in cooperation with John Wells Productions.

In 2020, it was reported that Luca Guadagnino hoped to direct a film based on the novel, and that he had examined Kubrick's papers on the project, held at the Stanley Kubrick Archive at University of the Arts London.

== See also ==
- Jurek Becker: Jacob the Liar (1969)
- Thomas Keneally: Schindler's Ark (1982)
