= Anti-Müllerian hormone type-2 receptor =

Protein receptor for anti-Müllerian hormone

AMHR2

Identifiers
- Aliases: AMHR2, AMHR, MISR2, MISRII, MRII, anti-Mullerian hormone receptor type 2
- External IDs: OMIM: 600956; MGI: 105062; GeneCards: AMHR2
Enzyme activity
| EC # | BRENDA | ExPASy | KEGG | MetaCyc |
|---|---|---|---|---|
| 2.7.11.30 | ↗ | ↗ | ↗ | ↗ |

Gene location (Human)
| Chr. | Chromosome 12 (human) |
| Band | 12q13.13 | Start | 53,423,855 bp |
| Band | 12q13.13 | End | 53,431,672 bp |

Gene location (Mouse)
| Chr. | Chromosome 15 (mouse) |
| Band | 15 F3|15 57.58 cM | Start | 102,353,802 bp |
| Band | 15 F3|15 57.58 cM | End | 102,363,068 bp |
RNA expression pattern
| Bgee | Human / Mouse (ortholog); Top expressed in: right adrenal cortex; left adrenal gland; left adrenal cortex; left ovary; right ovary; left testis; body of pancreas; right testis; skeletal muscle tissue; spleen / Top expressed in: seminiferous tubule; spermatocyte; facial motor nucleus; ovary; muscle layer of urethra; Gonadal ridge; epithelium of urethra; epithelium of female urethra; soleus muscle; lamina propria of vagina; More reference expression data |
| BioGPS | n/a |
Gene ontology
| Molecular function | transferase activity; nucleotide binding; protein kinase activity; hormone binding; transforming growth factor beta receptor activity, type II; metal ion binding; kinase activity; protein serine/threonine kinase activity; transmembrane receptor protein serine/threonine kinase activity; protein binding; ATP binding; anti-Mullerian hormone receptor activity; transforming growth factor beta-activated receptor activity; growth factor binding; SMAD binding |
| Cellular component | integral component of membrane; membrane; integral component of plasma membrane; plasma membrane; receptor complex |
| Biological process | male gonad development; phosphorylation; sex differentiation; female gonad development; negative regulation of anti-Mullerian hormone signaling pathway; Mullerian duct regression; protein phosphorylation; transmembrane receptor protein serine/threonine kinase signaling pathway; transforming growth factor beta receptor signaling pathway; BMP signaling pathway; anti-Mullerian hormone signaling pathway; pattern specification process |
Sources:Amigo / QuickGO
Orthologs
| Databases | NCBI: entry; OMA: entry |
| Species | Human | Mouse |
| Entrez | 269 | 110542 |
| Ensembl | ENSG00000135409 | ENSMUSG00000023047 |
| UniProt | Q16671 | Q8K592 |
| RefSeq (mRNA) | NM_001164690; NM_001164691; NM_020547 | NM_144547; NM_001356575 |
| RefSeq (protein) | NP_001158162; NP_001158163; NP_065434 | NP_653130; NP_001343504 |
| Location (UCSC) | Chr 12: 53.42 – 53.43 Mb | Chr 15: 102.35 – 102.36 Mb |
| PubMed search |
- Wikidata
| View/Edit Human | View/Edit Mouse |

Anti-Muellerian hormone type-2 receptor (AMHR2), also known as Müllerian inhibiting substance type II receptor (MISRII), is a receptor for anti-Müllerian hormone (AMH). It is a protein in humans that is encoded by the AMHR2 gene. AMHR2 protein plays a role in male sex differentiation and the formation of ovarian follicles.

== Structure ==
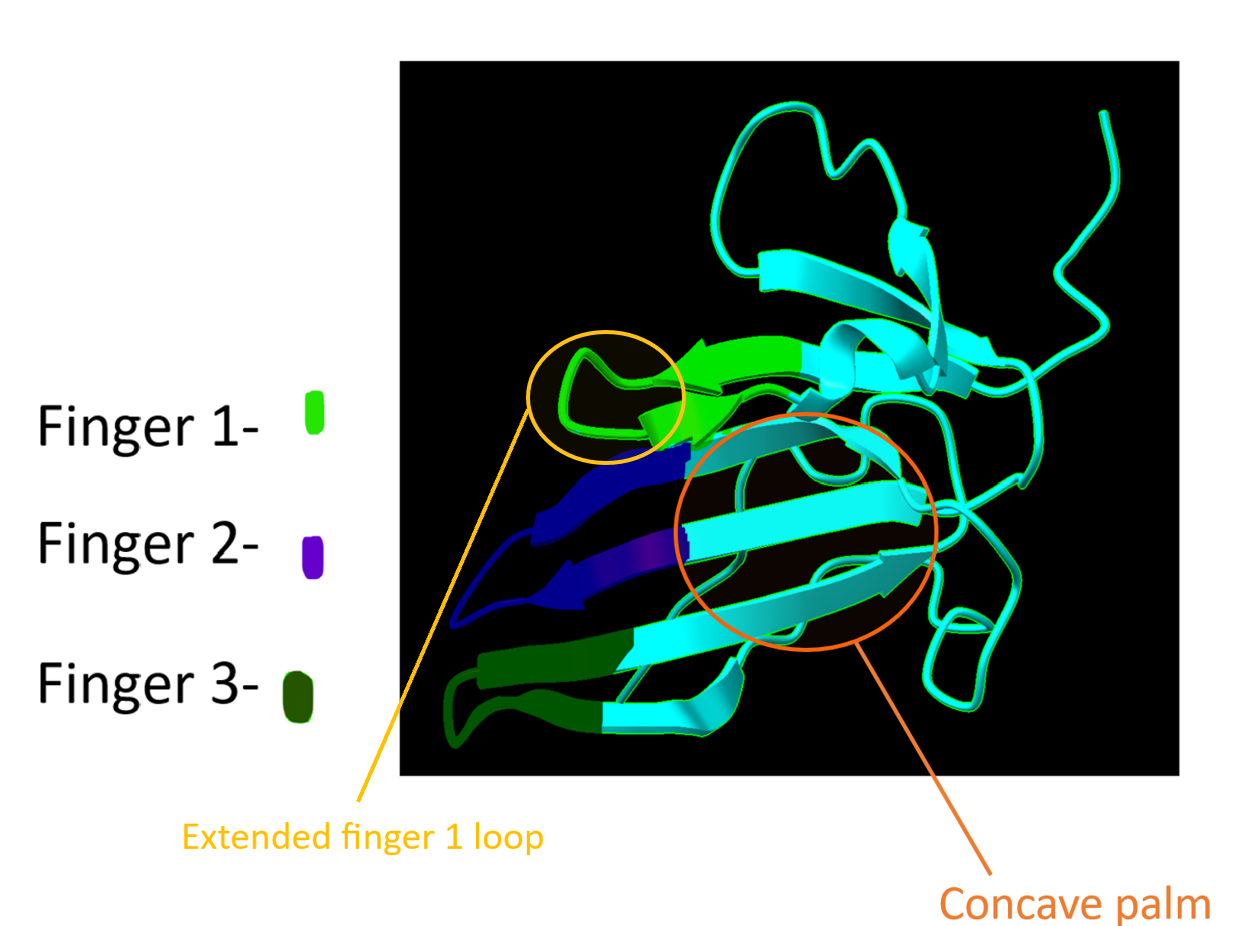
Annotated 3D structure of AMHR2.

AMHR2 belongs to TGF-β type II receptor family, a protein receptor on the surface of cells. Structurally it adopts the characteristic three-finger toxin fold, such that the outer portion of the receptor resembles three fingers. It displays a unique extended finger-1 loop, critical to signaling the AMH molecule. The palm region and other fingers are also necessary for the process of binding to the ligand, AMH. But these structures are relatively unremarkable when compared to other TGF-β type II receptors. As such, these interactions do not contribute significantly to the observed ligand specificity for AMH, it is primarily the uniqueness of the finger-1 loop which allows it to bind.

== Function ==
The gene is present in both men and women, because it is found in an autosome, one of the twenty two non-sex chromosomes pairs carried by humans. The AMHR2 is a Type II receptor that binds AMH. This hormone is responsible for Müllerian Duct regression in vertebrates once the SRY gene - the protein involved in sexual development of males - has been expressed.

Some animals, such as jawless fish, do not express either AMH or its receptors. High circulating AMH, pr the continual presence of AMH in the bloodstream, continues on after testis development and is secreted from the Sertoli cells. It is also expressed in Leydig cells. It has been reported that the loss of function of the AMHR2 gene results in 50% of XY animals experiencing a sex reversal from male to female. The loss of the protein's functionality has also led to hyper-proliferation of mitotically active germ cells, which leads to the sex reversal. AMH binding to the AMHR2 in mammals causes regression of the oviducts, uterus, and upper two thirds of the vagina.

== Clinical significance ==
AMHR2 is expressed by ovarian, breast, and prostate cancers. These cancer cells have been reported to apoptose in response to exposure to the Müllerian inhibiting substance (MIS).

Monoclonal antibodies have also been developed that specifically target MISIIR and may be useful as vehicles for drugs and toxins for targeted cancer therapy.

A syndrome called Persistent Mullerian duct syndrome (PMDS) can occur in human males and results in the uterus, vagina, and uterus being present in virilized male. The results are such that males may retain tissues normally eliminated during development. PMDS can be caused by a genetic mutation of deletions, or missenses, and these males often have undescended testes or cryptorchidism, where one testis fails to descend outside of the body cavity. The majority of these patients will be infertile. In females that are homozygous for the mutation, no abnormalities have been observed. However, heterozygous females have been observed to reach menopause sooner and display a lowered AMH level, which also is an indicator of antral follicle count. It is likely that these females reach menopause sooner as a result of having fewer antral follicles. This causes more atresia, or closing, of the follicles prior to developing an antrum. These phenotypes were confirmed to be the cause of an AMHR2 mutation from resulting studies performed in mice.

== See also ==
- Autosome
- Chromosome 12
- Intersex
