= Anatol Mühlstein =

Polish diplomat (1889–1957)

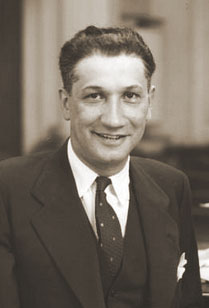
- Mühlstein in 1932
- Born: 22 August 1889; Warsaw, Poland
- Died: 29 September 1957 (aged 68); Paris, France
- Occupation: Diplomat
- Spouse: Diane de Rothschild (m. 1932)
- Children: 3 (including Anka Muhlstein and Nathalie Josso)
- Relatives: Stéphane Dujarric (grandson)

Anatol Mühlstein (22 August 1889 – 29 September 1957) was a Polish diplomat and writer. He served as Chargé d'affaires for the Polish embassy in Brussels in 1927, and as Minister Plenipotentiary for the Polish embassy in Paris 1930–36.

Born to a Jewish family in Warsaw, he studied in Geneva, Paris, and Brussels. Mühlstein was studying in Brussels when war broke out in August 1914. Stranded without support, the family of a law professor took him in. He later married and divorced a daughter in the family, Suzanne Dumont. He was active in the Belgian resistance, and was one of three founders of an underground journal first published in 1918, Le Flambeau alongside the historian Henri Grégoire and Oscar Grosjean. After the war, the periodical continued publication throughout the interwar years.

Mühlstein joined the Polish diplomatic service in 1919, assigned to Brussels. During that time, he was a member of the Polish delegation to the Locarno Conference and League of Nations assemblies. He was promoted and transferred to Paris in 1930.

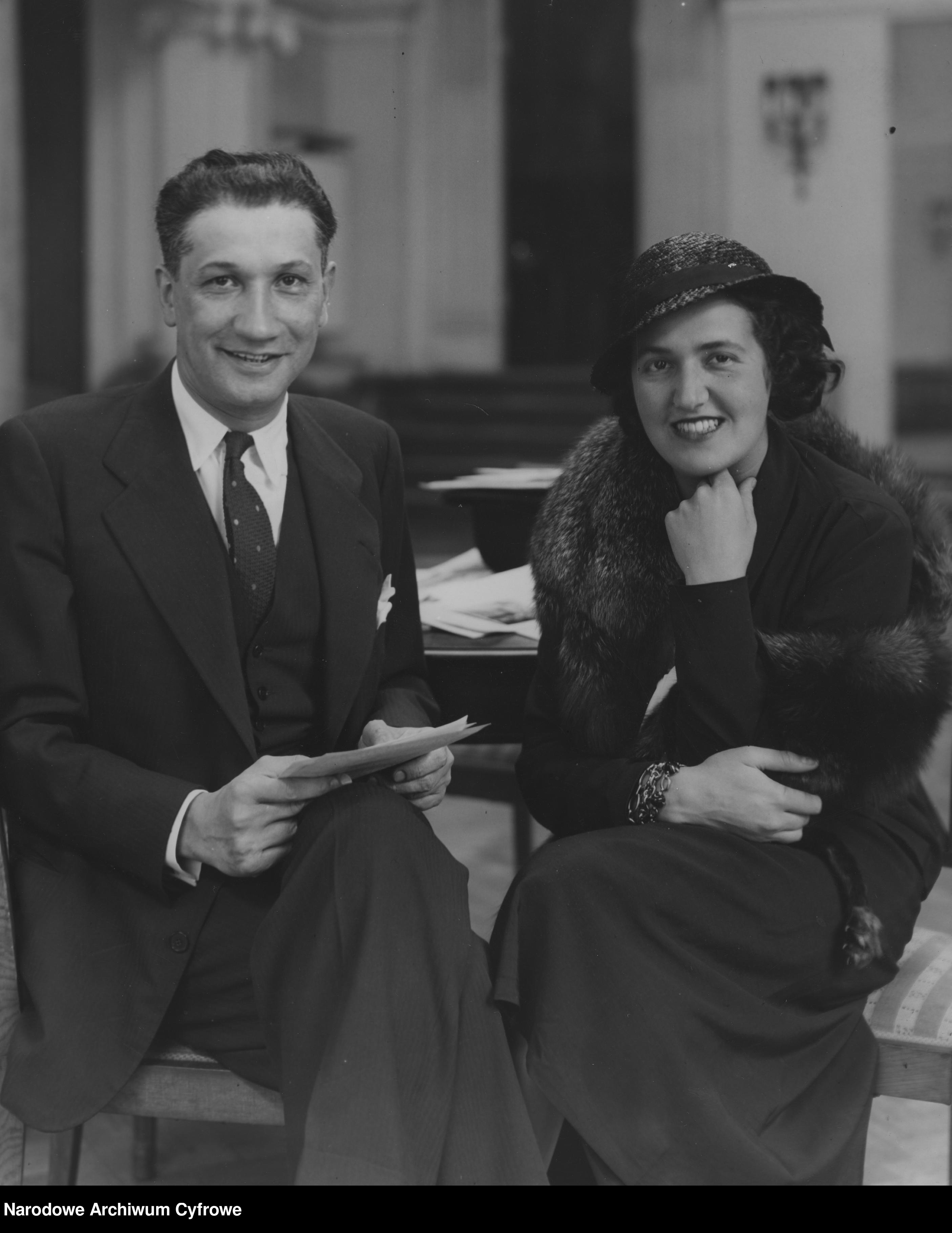
Anatol and Diane Mühlstein, 1932

In 1932, Mühlstein married Diane de Rothschild, daughter of French banker Robert de Rothschild. The couple had three daughters: Cécile, Anka, and Nathalie.

After the German invasion of France, Mühlstein moved to the United States. He returned to France after World War II.
