= Gustave de Rothschild =

French banker

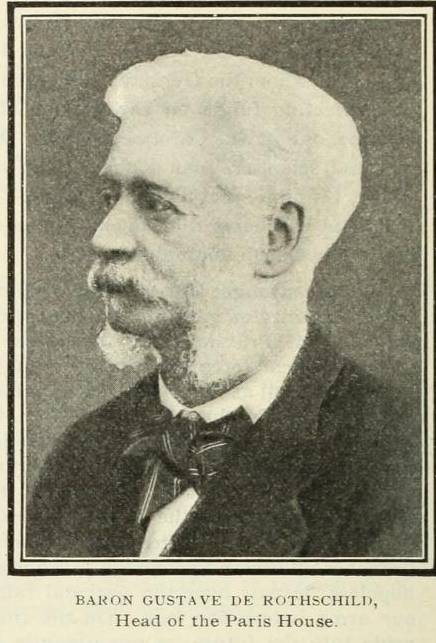
- Born: Gustave Samuel James de Rothschild; 17 February 1829; Paris, France
- Died: 28 November 1911 (aged 82); Paris, France
- Spouse: Cécile Anspach (m. 1859)
- Children: Octave de Rothschild; Zoé Lucie Betty de Rothschild; Aline Caroline de Rothschild; Bertha Juliette de Rothschild; André de Rothschild; Robert de Rothschild
- Parent(s): James Mayer Rothschild and Betty Salomon von Rothschild

Gustave Samuel James de Rothschild, Baron de Rothschild (17 February 1829 in Paris – 28 November 1911 in Paris), was a French banker and scion of the French branch of the Rothschild family.

== Early life ==
He was the second son of James Mayer de Rothschild and Betty Salomon von Rothschild (of the German branch of the same family).

He built the Château de Laversine in Saint-Maximin near Chantilly.

== Personal life ==
In accordance with Rothschild tradition, Gustave was expected to marry a cousin, and his family hoped that he would propose to one of his cousins, Mathilde von Rothschild or Evelina de Rothschild. Instead, in 1859, Gustave married Cécile Anspach, the daughter of a high official in the Court of Cassation, and they had six children:

1. Octave de Rothschild (1860–1860), who died young.
2. Zoé Lucie Betty de Rothschild (1863–1916), who married Belgian banker Léon Lambert in 1882.
3. Aline Caroline de Rothschild (1867–1909), who married Sir Edward Albert Sassoon (1856–1912) in 1887.
4. Bertha Juliette de Rothschild (1870–1896), who died unmarried.
5. André de Rothschild (1874–1877), who died young.
6. Robert de Rothschild (1880–1946), who married Gabrielle Nelly Régine Beer in 1907.

He was rumored to be the lover of Marguerite Durand, publisher of La Fronde.
