= Stéphane Dujarric =

UN official

Spokesperson for the United Nations Secretary-General
- Incumbent
- Assumed office 7 March 2014
- Secretary-General: Ban Ki-moon; António Guterres
- Preceded by: Martin Nesirky
- In office 20 June 2005 – 31 December 2006
- Secretary-General: Kofi Annan
- Preceded by: Fred Eckhard
- Succeeded by: Michèle Montas

Personal details
- Born: Stéphane Dujarric de la Rivière; 20 August 1965 (age 61) Paris, France
- Spouse: Ilaria Skouras Quadrani (m. 1995)
- Parent(s): François Dujarric de la Rivière; Anka Muhlstein
- Relatives: René Dujarric de la Rivière (paternal grandfather); Anatol Mühlstein (maternal grandfather); Louis Begley (step-father); Adam Begley (step-brother)

Stéphane Dujarric de la Rivière (French pronunciation: [stefan dyʒaʁik də la ʁivjɛʁ]; born 25 August 1965) is a French former journalist who has served as a spokesperson for the United Nations Secretary-General since 2014. Dujarric had previously served as Spokesman for Secretary-General Kofi Annan from 2005 to 2006 and then Deputy Communications Director for Secretary-General Ban Ki-moon from 2006 to 2007.

== Early life ==
Dujarric was born in Paris to Francois Dujarric de la Rivière (1933–2018) and his wife Anka Muhlstein (born 1935). He graduated from Georgetown University's School of Foreign Service. He has been living in the United States for the best part of the last 40 years.

== Career ==
Prior to his current appointment, Dujarric was Director of News and Media for the United Nations Department of Public Information, a position that he had held since March 2011. In this role, he oversaw the UN's television, radio and photo operations. He coordinates the work of the main United Nations news sites. His Division is also responsible for media liaison and accreditation, providing logistical support and information to the international press corps, as well as coverage of official UN meetings, producing written coverage for the media, delegations and the general public, such as press releases, meetings summaries and dissemination of official statements and remarks.

Prior to this assignment, Dujarric was Director of Communications for the UN Development Programme (UNDP).

Dujarric was named Chief Spokesman for Secretary-General Kofi Annan in 2005, after joining the United Nations in 2000 as an Associate Spokesman. During his time as Spokesman, he conducted briefings for the UN press corps and faced questions on a number of crises, notably the Oil-for-Food scandal and the Israel-Lebanon conflict. Following Annan's departure, Dujarric worked as Deputy Communications Director for Secretary-General Ban Ki-moon. On 19 February 2014, it was announced that Dujarric would once again become the spokesman for the UN Secretary-General, replacing Martin Nesirky who had held that position for four years.

Before joining the United Nations, Dujarric worked for ABC News television for close to 10 years in the network's New York City, London and Paris news bureaus. He traveled on assignment to cover stories throughout Europe, Africa and the Middle East.
