= Su e zo per i ponti =

The Su e zo per i ponti (Up and Down the Bridges in the Venetian language) is a non-competitive walk held in Venice in April. The walk starts in the Piazza San Marco, in front of the Doge's Palace. Walkers follow a route characteristic of the city, which leads them through calli (streets), campi (squares) and ponti (bridges). The Su e Zo is also known as Solidarity Walk (it. passeggiata di solidarietà) because the revenues of the event go to charitable projects.

Different routes are laid out for various age groups: the main circuit runs over 47 bridges and is 12 km long whereas a shorter route is 7 km long and crosses 27 bridges. Beverage is provided by the organisers along the track. About 400-600 volunteers help with the organisation and implementation of the event, which is visited by about 10 to 12,000 participants every year. The event is managed by the TGS Eurogroup (Turismo Giovanile Sociale, it. Social Youth Tourism), a non-profit organisation founded by a Salesian of Don Bosco, Dino Berti, who has started the Su e Zo walk in 1975.

Walkers receive a commemorative medal on completing the event, groups from a given size up will receive a larger badge. There are special prizes for schools in different categories and special groups. After the award ceremony other festivities follow such as a performance of flag-wavers and folklore groups.

The revenues from starting fees are donated to charity projects, often in developing countries such as Peru, Brasil, Syria, Etopia, Haiti or the earthquake affected town of L'Aquila.
