= Alfred Jost =

French endocrinologist (1916–1991)

- Born: 27 July 1916; Strasbourg
- Died: 3 February 1991 (aged 74)
- Known for: anti-Müllerian hormone
- Scientific career
- Fields: Endocrinology
- Workplaces: Collège de France

Alfred Jost (1916–1991) was a French endocrinologist, and an early researcher in the field of fetal endocrinology. He is known for his discovery of the Müllerian inhibitor, now called anti-Müllerian hormone (AMH) or Müllerian inhibiting substance (MIS). His research demonstrated how hormones affect the development of male and female sex characteristics.

== Career ==
Jost was a professor at the University of Paris, and was head of the Department of Comparative Physiology there in 1972. Jost was known for applying surgical methods to fetal endocrinology. He also taught many pre-doctoral students.

== Research ==
During the 1950s and 1960s Jost studied the mechanism of somatic sex differentiation; his research showed that male characteristics must be imposed on the fetus by the testicular hormones testosterone and AMH, and that in the absence or inactivity of these hormones, the fetus becomes phenotypically female.

Jost also studied testicular differentiation, in collaboration with Solange Magre. He was the first to show that testicular organization is heralded by the development of pre-Sertoli cells, which progressively surround germ cells to form seminiferous tubules.

== Death ==
He died February 3, 1991, at age 75, having retired from the Collège de France, but still active as the Secrétaire Perpétuel of the French Academy of Sciences.
