= Persistent Müllerian duct syndrome =

- Other names: Persistent Müllerian derivatives
- Persistent Müllerian duct syndrome has an autosomal recessive pattern of inheritance.
- Specialty: Medical genetics

Persistent Müllerian duct syndrome (PMDS) is the presence of Müllerian duct derivatives (fallopian tubes, uterus, and/or the upper part of the vagina) in what would be considered a genetically and otherwise physically normal male animal by typical human based standards. In humans, PMDS typically is due to an autosomal recessive congenital disorder and is considered by some to be a form of pseudohermaphroditism due to the presence of Müllerian derivatives. PMDS can also present in non-human animals.

Typical features include undescended testes (cryptorchidism) and the presence of a small, underdeveloped uterus in an XY infant or adult. This condition is usually caused by deficiency of fetal anti-Müllerian hormone (AMH) effect due to mutations of the gene for AMH or the anti-Müllerian hormone receptor, but may also be as a result of insensitivity to AMH of the target organ.

== Presentation ==
The first visible signs of PMDS after birth is cryptorchidism (undescended testes) either unilaterally or bilaterally, as well as inguinal hernias. Adults who have been oblivious to this condition may present with haematuria, which is when blood appears in urine because of hormonal imbalances. PMDS Type I is also referred to as hernia uteri inguinalis, which exhibits one descended testis that has also pulled the fallopian tube, and sometimes uterus, through the inguinal canal. The descended testes, fallopian tube and uterus all fall in the same inguinal canal, causing an inguinal hernia. When the aforementioned conditions occur together, it is called transverse testicular ectopia.

Under the microscope, some samples taken for biopsies displayed results where testicular tissue was at a stage of immaturity and showed dysplasia.

== Genetics ==
Mutation in AMH gene (PMDS Type 1) or AMHR2 gene (PMDS Type 2) are the primary causes of PMDS. AMH, or sometimes referred to as Müllerian inhibiting substance (MIS), is secreted by Sertoli cells during an individual's whole life. It is essential during the foetal period as it functions to regress the Müllerian ducts. However, AMH also functions in the last trimester of pregnancy, after birth, and even during adulthood in minimal amounts. The Sertoli cells in males secrete AMH, through the presence of a Y chromosome.

The role of the AMH gene in reproductive development, is the production of a protein that contributes to male sex differentiation. During development of male foetuses, the AMH protein is secreted by cells within the testes. AMHs bind to the AMH Type 2 Receptors, which are present on cells on the surface of the Müllerian duct. The binding of AMH to its receptors on the Müllerian duct induces the apoptosis of the Müllerian duct cells, thus the regression of the Müllerian duct within males. However, for females who originally do not produce AMH proteins during foetal development, the Müllerian duct eventually becomes the uterus and fallopian tubes as normal. With the AMH gene mutation (PMDS Type 1), the AMH is either not produced, produced in deficient amounts, defective, or secreted at the wrong critical period for male differentiation.

AMHR2 contains the instructions for generating the receptors that AMH binds to. If there is a mutation in the AMHR2 gene, the response to AMH molecules binding to the receptor cannot be properly reciprocated. Other possibilities include an absence of the receptors, such that the AMH molecules cannot induce differentiation. Mutation in the AMHR2 is critical to proper male sex differentiation. The genetic mutational cause of PMDS, is a 27 base-pair deletion of the Anti-Müllerian Type 2 Receptor gene. The 27-base-pair deletion that occurs PMDS is in exon 10 on one allele. With the AMHR2 gene mutation (PMDS Type 2), the AMHR2 is either not produced, produced in deficient amounts, defective, or the Müllerian ducts manifested a resistance to AMH.

PMDS is inherited in an autosomal recessive manner. The male individuals inherit mutated copies of the X chromosomes from the maternal and paternal genes, implying the parents are carriers and do not show symptoms. Females inheriting two mutated genes do not display symptoms of PMDS, though remain as carriers. Males are affected genotypically with the karyotype (46, XY) and phenotypically.

== Diagnosis ==
Persistent Müllerian duct syndrome (PMDS), also known as persistent oviduct syndrome, is a congenital disorder related to male sexual development. PMDS usually affects phenotypically normal male individuals with the karyotype (46, XY) and is a form of pseudohermaphroditism.

The condition occurs in males and consists of normal-functioning reproductive organs and gonads, but also female reproductive organs such as the uterus and the fallopian tubes. The fetus has two sets of tubes which give rise to accessory reproductive organs - the (Wolffian) mesonephric ducts and the (Müllerian) paramesonephric ducts. Usually, the Wolffian duct gives rise to male reproductive organs (specifically the testicle, epididymis and vas deferens) while the Müllerian to female (the fallopian tubes, the uterus and the vagina), while the other duct regresses. In PMDS, an abnormality in the anti-Müllerian hormone signaling pathway causes the in-males-redundant Müllerian duct to persist and give rise to variously developed female reproductive organs.

PMDS has various causes related to AMH or receptor abnormalities. For example, AMH has failed to synthesize, failed to release or was secreted at the wrong time. Normally, both the Müllerian and Wolffian ducts are present during the 7th week of gestation. At approximately the end of the 7th and the beginning of the 8th week of gestation, the Sertoli cell's secretion of AMH occurs, causing male sex differentiation during fetal development. The AMH molecules bind to AMHRII (anti-Müllerian hormone receptor type II) regressing the Müllerian duct. The Leydig cells secrete testosterone to aid the male differentiation process by inducing structures such as the epididymis, vas deferens and seminal vesicles. However, with PMDS individuals, the Müllerian duct persists instead of regressing, either due to AMH secretion (PMDS Type I) or AMH receptors (PMDS Type II). PMDS is usually coincidentally found during surgery for inguinal hernia, or when searching for adult male infertility causes.

=== Other diagnostic tests ===
==== Genetic ====
Another method for the confirmation of PMDS is genetic testing. It is not usually preferred because of its processing period and cost. With image screenings such as ultrasound and MRI, the condition can be efficiently confirmed. Genetic tests can identify those who hold the mutated gene, identify the family member's chances and risks, and advise those who are trying to get pregnant. Genetic counseling and further genetic testing is offered to confirm the chances and risks of an individual's offspring obtaining the pair of mutated genes. Further research into the family tree and inheritance is possible as well.

==== ELISA ====
An ELISA test is a form of immunoassay, a technique which uses an antibody or antigen to identify the presence of particular substances. For PMDS, ELISA tests can be used to determine the levels of AMH within the male individual's serum, but this is only effective before the individual reaches puberty as it normally increases during this period. PMDS patients display low levels of AMH within the serum, and low levels of testosterone.

== Treatment ==
Persistent Müllerian duct syndrome does not cause any physical complications, and does not pose any danger to a newborn child. Surgeries on newborn infants have a high rate of failure, and uterine tissue tends to be healthy. The World Health Organization (WHO) standard of care is to delay surgery until the child is old enough to participate in informed consent; performing intersex genital surgeries on newborn infants is considered a human rights violation, including by the WHO.

The main form of treatment is laparotomy, a modern and minimally invasive type of surgery. Laparotomy properly positions the testes within the scrotum (orchidopexy) and removes Müllerian structures, the uterus, and fallopian tubes. Occasionally they are unsalvageable if located high in the retroperitoneum. During this surgery, the uterus is usually removed and attempts made to dissect away Müllerian tissue from the vas deferens and epididymis to improve the chance of fertility. If the person has male gender identity and the testes cannot be retrieved, testosterone replacement will usually be necessary at puberty should the affected individual choose to pursue medical attention. Recently, laparoscopic hysterectomy is offered to patients as a solution to both improve the chances of fertility and to prevent the occurrence of neoplastic tissue formation. Having a target age for surgery reduces the risks of damaging the vas deferens. The vas deferens is in close proximity to the Müllerian structures, and is sometimes lodged in the uterine wall.

PMDS patients have a possibility of infertility in the future if not promptly operated on. When the affected males are adults, those who are not aware of the condition may find the presence of blood in their semen (hematospermia). The Müllerian structures and cryptorchidism can also develop into cancer, although this is incredibly rare. If PMDS is found during adulthood, or if Müllerian structures had to be left behind due to risks in surgery, biopsies of the remaining Müllerian structures can be performed. Upon pathohistological observation, the endometrial tissues appear atrophied, and the fallopian tubes have begun to congest showing signs of fibrosis.

== Epidemiology ==
PMDS is a relatively rare congenital condition. From current data, approximately 45% of the known cases are caused by mutations in the AMH gene, being a mutation on chromosome 19 (Type I PMDS). Approximately, 40% are AMHR2 mutations, on the AMH receptor type 2 gene, which is on chromosome 12 (Type 2 PMDS). The remaining unknown 15% are referred to as idiopathic PMDS.

== Case studies ==
Especially before the 21st century, these conditions were hard to diagnose due to the lack of modern imaging capabilities. For this reason, the older population, or those in poorer countries found out later. PMDS was usually overlooked because the external symptoms, such as the cryptorchidism and inguinal hernias, were assumed to be the only complication.

A case reported in 2013, involves a 50-year-old male with a history of low testosterone levels, high cholesterol and the congenital absence of his right testis. Imaging revealed that the patient had three cystic masses, with structures similar to the uterus and ovaries, thus PMDS. During the operation, the surgeons found malignant degeneration of the Müllerian remnants which occurs if PMDS is unnoticed for a long period of time. The cause of the complications presented in the male patient was due to the unidentified bilateral cryptorchidism since birth, as doctors at that time assumed the complication was just the "congenital absence of his right testis". Overlooking the symptoms of PDMS can cause permanent negative effects such as infertility and future malignancies, as shown by this male patient. The malignant degeneration of the Müllerian structures is supportive evidence for the cause of the male patient's infertility.

== Popular culture ==
In the 2024 film Conclave, one of the characters is revealed to be intersex. The way his condition is described matches the main criteria for PMDS.

== See also ==
- Intersex
- Sexual differentiation
- Cryptorchidism
- Anti-Müllerian hormone
