= René Dujarric de la Rivière =

French physician and botanist (1885–1969)

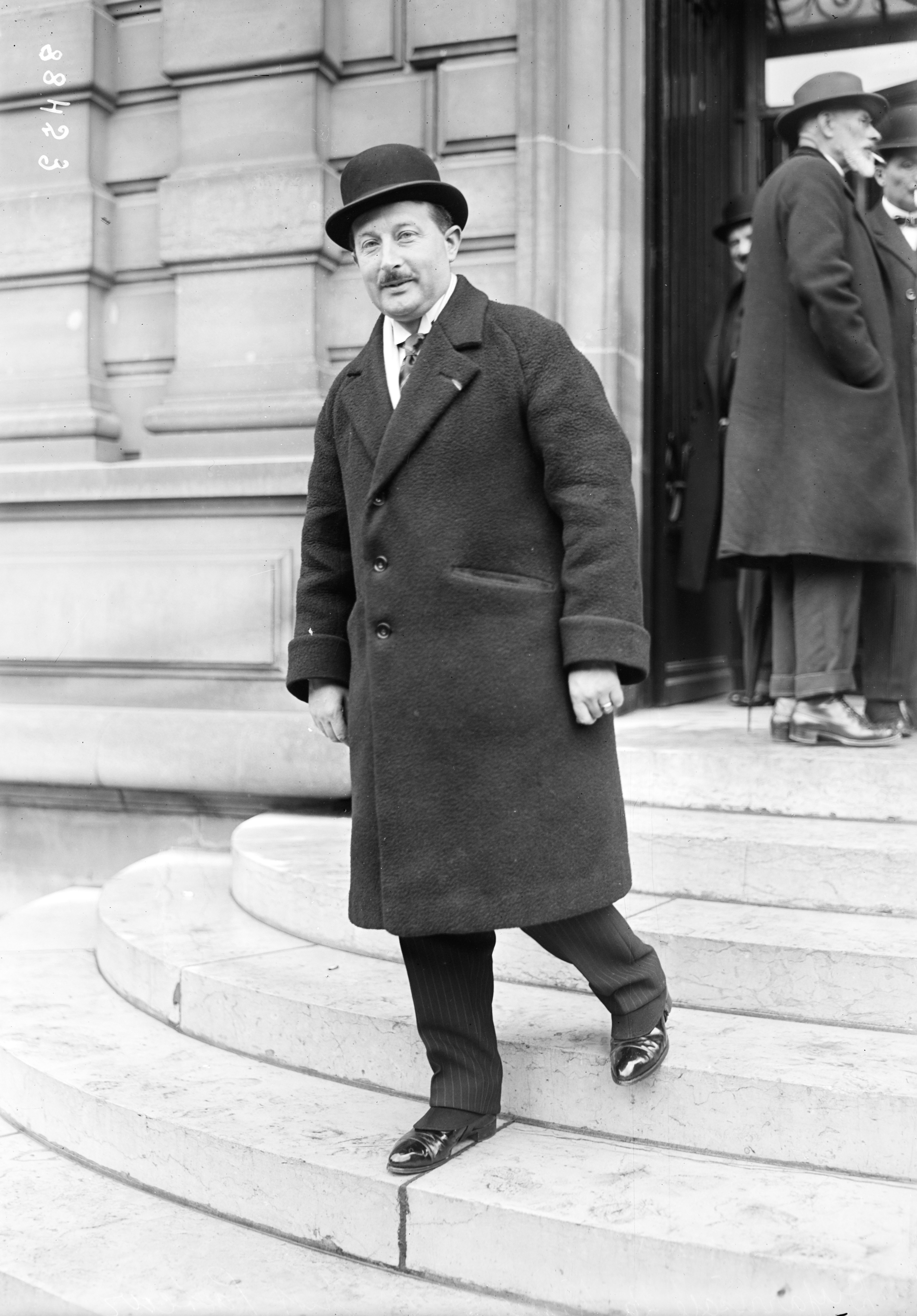
- Dujarric in 1923
- Born: 19 April 1885; Excideuil
- Died: 28 November 1969 (aged 84); Neuilly-sur-Seine
- Spouse: Marcelle Friedmann
- Relatives: Stéphane Dujarric (grandson)
- Scientific career
- Fields: Microbiology

René Dujarric de la Rivière (19 April 1885 – 28 November 1969) was a French microbiologist and hygienist.

He studied medicine in Bordeaux and Lyon, then for several years worked as a medical extern at the Hospitals Necker and Ténon in Paris (1905–10). In 1913 he received his medical doctorate, and in 1929, obtained his doctorate in natural sciences. From 1945 to 1958 he was an assistant director of the Pasteur Institute.

In 1918 he demonstrated that influenza was caused by a filterable agent that was in all probability a virus. In the 1920s he performed research of Amanita phalloides (death cap mushroom) in Louis Lapicque's laboratory at the Sorbonne, producing an antitoxic serum (serum antiphallinique) as a result. In 1927, at the Pasteur Institute, he established a center for the study of blood groups.

In 1930, with Jules Bordet, he founded the Société Internationale de Microbiologie. He was a member of the Société de biologie (from 1928), the Académie Nationale de Médecine (from 1945, department of hygiene) and in 1951, was appointed president of the Société mycologique de France.

== Selected works ==
- Hygiène hospitalière (with Louis Martin), 1927.
- Étiologie et prophylaxie de la grippe : bacille de Pfeiffer, virus filtrant grippal, 1929.
- Etude physiologique d'un extrait d'amanite phalloïde, 1929.
- Le poison des amanites mortelles, 1933.
- Les groupes sanguins, 1936.
- Les champignons toxiques; caractères et détermination; toxines, intoxications, thérapeutique (with Roger Heim), 1938.
- Les groupes sanguins chez les animaux; individualités sanguine et tissulaire (with André Eyquem), 1953.
