= Saint-Maximin, Oise =

Saint-Maximin
- Commune
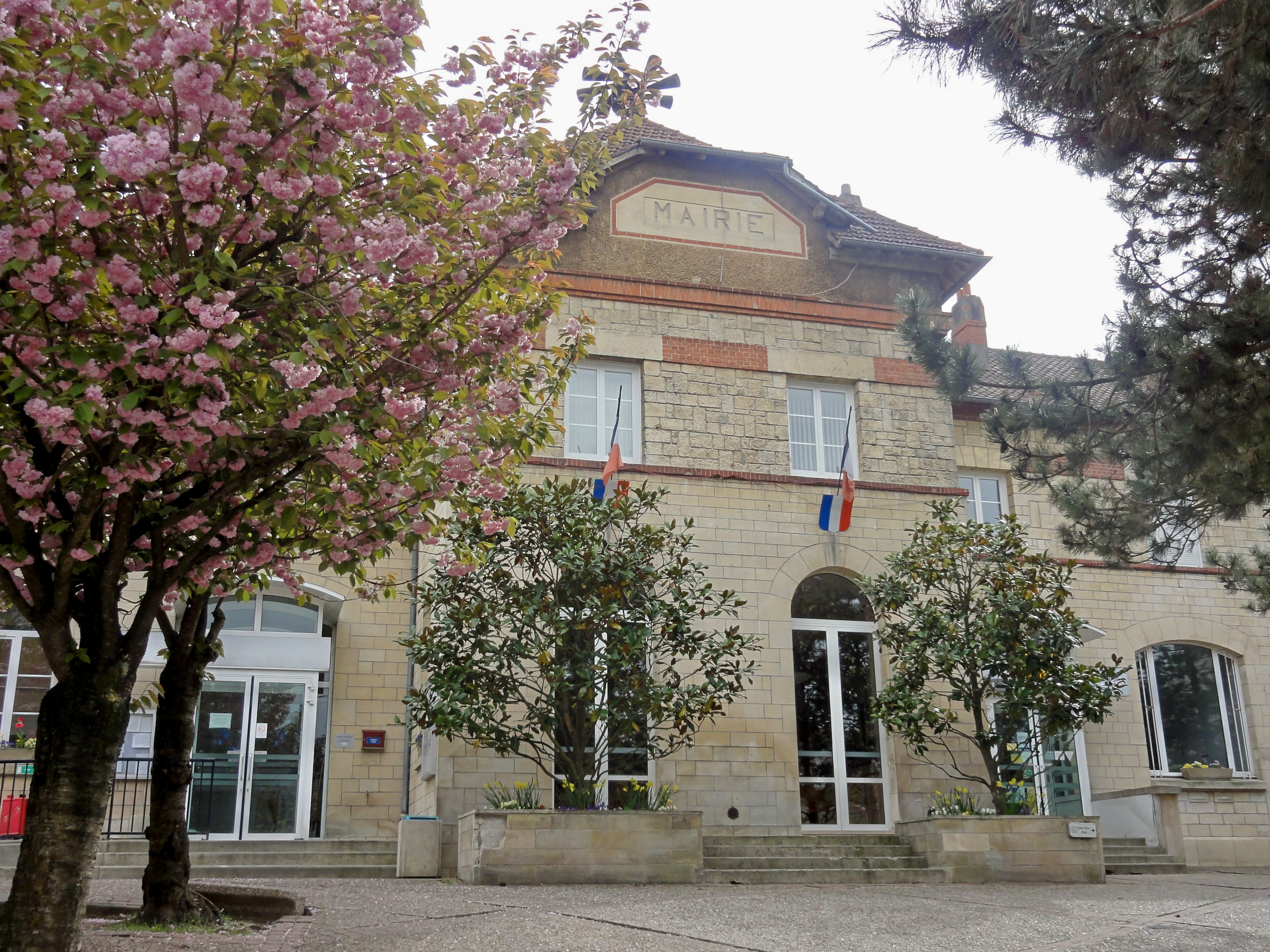
- The town hall in Saint-Maximin
- Location of Saint-Maximin
- Location within France Location within Hauts-de-France
- Coordinates: 49°13′19″N 2°26′51″E
- Country: France
- Region: Hauts-de-France
- Department: Oise
- Arrondissement: Senlis
- Canton: Chantilly
- Intercommunality: CA Creil Sud Oise

Government
  - Mayor (2024–2026): Chahinumsse Azouza
- Area^{1}: 12.33 km^{2} (4.76 sq mi)
- Elevation: 59 m (194 ft)
- Highest elevation: 125 m (410 ft)
- Lowest elevation: 25 m (82 ft)
- Population (2023): 3,335
  - Density: 270.5/km^{2} (700.5/sq mi)
- Time zone: UTC+01:00 (CET)
  - Summer (DST): UTC+02:00 (CEST)
- INSEE/Postal code: 60589 /60740
- ^{1} French Land Register data, which excludes lakes, ponds, glaciers > 1 km^{2} (0.386 sq mi or 247 acres) and river estuaries.

Saint-Maximin (French pronunciation: [sɛ̃ maksimɛ̃]) is a commune in the Oise department in northern France.

== Population ==
Historical population
Year	Pop.	±% p.a.
1968	1,801	—
1975	2,100	+2.22%
1982	2,174	+0.50%
1990	2,377	+1.12%
1999	2,399	+0.10%
2007	2,510	+0.57%
2012	2,892	+2.87%
2017	2,938	+0.32%
2023	3,335	+2.13%
Source: INSEE

== Quarries ==
Saint-Maximin is noted for its quarries, which are the source of Saint-Maximin limestone, a widely used French building stone.

== See also ==
- Communes of the Oise department
