= Anthony Denis Maurice George de Worms =

Austrian aristocrat (1869–1938)

- Born: 4 January 1869
- Died: 11 January 1938 (aged 69)
- Occupation: Philatelist
- Spouse: Louisa Matilda Goldsmidt
- Children: Charles de Worms; George de Worms; Violet Henrietta de Worms
- Parent(s): George de Worms, 2nd Baron de Worms; Louisa de Samuel
- Relatives: Mayer Amschel Rothschild (paternal great-great-grandfather); Solomon Benedict de Worms (paternal grandfather)

Baron Anthony Denis Maurice George de Worms (4 January 1869 – 11 January 1938) was an Austrian aristocrat (by courtesy) and an English philatelist.

== Biography ==
=== Early life ===
Anthony Denis Maurice George de Worms was born on 4 January 1869. His father was George de Worms, 2nd Baron de Worms and his mother, Louisa de Samuel. He had a brother, Percy de Worms, and a sister, Henrietta Emmy Louisa Amelia de Worms. His paternal grandfather, Solomon Benedict de Worms, owned large plantations in Ceylon and was made a Hereditary Baron of the Austrian Empire by Franz Joseph I of Austria, and his paternal grandmother was Henrietta Samuel. His family was Jewish.

His paternal great-grandmother was Schönche Jeannette Rothschild, thus his paternal great-great-grandfather was Mayer Amschel Rothschild, the founder of the Rothschild banking dynasty. As a result, his paternal great-great-granduncles were Amschel Mayer Rothschild, Salomon Mayer von Rothschild, Nathan Mayer Rothschild, Carl Mayer von Rothschild, and James Mayer de Rothschild. His great-uncles, who owned plantations in Ceylon with his grandfather, were Maurice Benedict de Worms and Gabriel Benedict de Worms. His paternal uncle was Henry de Worms, 1st Baron Pirbright.

=== Adult life ===
He was a Fellow of the Royal Philatelic Society and the Royal Society of Literature.

He became 3rd Baron de Worms in 1902, but renounced his aristocratic title in 1920.

=== Personal life ===
He married Louisa Matilda Goldsmidt, daughter of Moritz A. Goldsmidt, in 1901. They had two sons and one daughter:

- Charles de Worms (1903–1979).
- George Gerald Percy de Worms (1904–1968).
- Violet Henrietta Louisa de Worms (1912–1984).

They resided at Milton Park in Egham, Surrey.
