= Worm (surname) =

Worm, Worms or de Worms is a surname. Notable people with the surname include:

== Worm ==
- Alfred Worm (1945–2007), Austrian investigative journalist, author and professor
- Boris Worm (born 1969), marine ecologist
- Christen Worm (1672–1737), Danish bishop
- Erik Worm (1900–1962), Danish tennis player
- Ole Worm (1588–1655), Danish physician
- Ronnie Worm (born 1953), German footballer
- Rutger Worm (born 1986), Dutch footballer
- Siri Worm (born 1992), Dutch footballer

== Worms or de Worms ==
- Solomon Benedict de Worms, 1st Baron de Worms (1801–1882), Austrian aristocrat, plantation owner in Ceylon, and stockbroker in London
  - George de Worms, 2nd Baron de Worms (1829–1902), Austrian aristocrat and English public official and banker; son of the above
    - Anthony Denis Maurice George de Worms, 3rd Baron de Worms (1869–1938), Austrian aristocrat and English philatelist, son of George de Worms
      - Charles de Worms (1903–1979), English chemist and lepidopterist, son of Anthony de Worms
    - Percy de Worms (1873–1941), English aristocrat and philatelist, son of George de Worms
- Maurice Benedict de Worms (1805–1867), Austrian plantation owner in Ceylon, brother of Solomon de Worms
- Worms family, a European Jewish family
  - Henry de Worms, 1st Baron Pirbright (1840–1903), British politician
  - René Worms (1869–1926), a French auditor of the council of state
- Aaron Worms (1754–1836), chief rabbi of Metz and a Talmudist
- Bernhard Worms (1930–2024), German politician
- Ernest Ailred Worms (1891–1963), German missionary and linguist in Australian Indigenous languages
- Jean Worms (1884–1943), French film actor
- Jules Worms (1832–1924), French painter
