= George de Worms, 2nd Baron de Worms =

English public official & banker (1829-1912)

- Born: 16 February 1829
- Died: 26 November 1912 (aged 83)
- Occupations: Public official Banker
- Spouse: Louisa de Samuel
- Children: Baron Anthony Denis Maurice George de Worms; Percy George de Worms; Henrietta Emmy Louisa Amelia de Worms
- Parents: Solomon Benedict de Worms (father); Henrietta Samuel (mother)
- Relatives: Mayer Amschel Rothschild (paternal great-grandfather); Anthony Denis Maurice George de Worms (son); Percy George de Worms (son)

George de Worms, 2nd Baron de Worms (1829–1912) was an Austrian aristocrat, and an English public official and banker.

== Biography ==
=== Early life ===
George de Worms was born on 16 February 1829. His father, Solomon Benedict de Worms, owned large plantations in Ceylon and was made a Hereditary Baron of the Austrian Empire by Franz Joseph I of Austria. His mother was Henrietta Samuel. His siblings were Anthony Mayer de Worms, Ellen Henrietta de Worms, and Henry de Worms, 1st Baron Pirbright.

His paternal grandmother was Schönche Jeannette Rothschild, thus, his paternal great-grandfather was Mayer Amschel Rothschild, the founder of the Rothschild banking dynasty. As a result, his paternal great-granduncles were Amschel Mayer Rothschild, Salomon Mayer von Rothschild, Nathan Mayer Rothschild, Carl Mayer von Rothschild, and James Mayer de Rothschild. His uncles, who owned plantations in Ceylon with his father, were Maurice Benedict de Worms and Gabriel Benedict de Worms.

=== Career ===
He served as Justice of the Peace for Middlesex, the City of Westminster, and Surrey. He subsequently served as Deputy Lieutenant of Surrey.

Together with Theodor Porges and his brother Henry, he was involved with Foreign Bankers and Merchants, located at 1 Austin Friars in London; it was dissolved in March 1880.

He became the 2nd Baron de Worms on 20 October 1882. Additionally, he was awarded the honor of Knight Commander of the Order of Franz Joseph. He was a Fellow of the Society of Antiquaries of London.

He was also a member of the Anglo-Jewish Association.

=== Personal life ===
He married Louisa de Samuel. They had three children:

- Baron Anthony Denis Maurice George de Worms (1869–1938)
- Percy George de Worms (1873–1941)
- Henrietta Emmy Louisa Amelia de Worms (born 1875)

They resided at Milton Park in Egham, Surrey, England. He died on 26 November 1912.
