= History of the Jews in Sri Lanka =

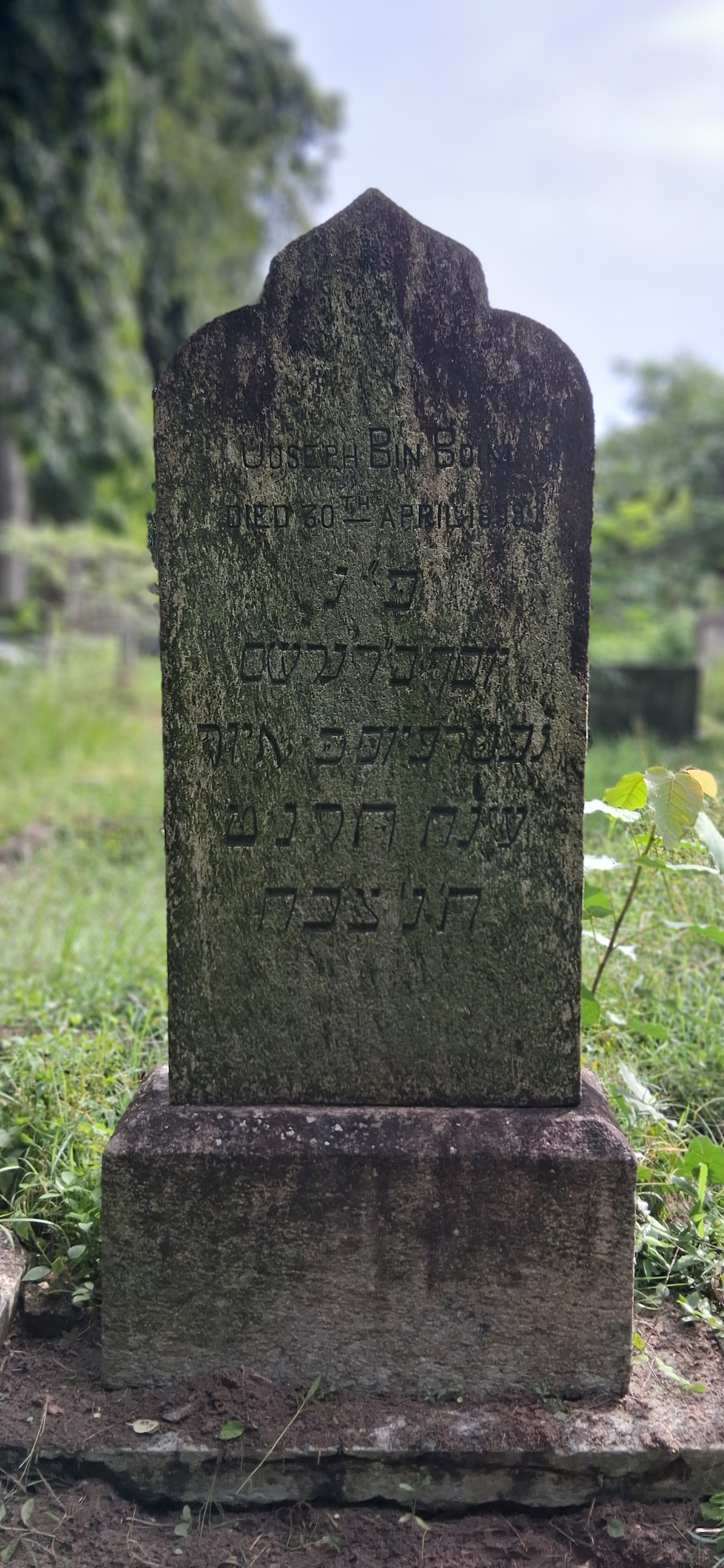
Jewish gravestone at the Borella Cemetery, Colombo. The inscription on the gravestone: Joseph Bin Boim DIED 30TH APRIL 1899 פ"נ (Here lies buried) יוסף ב"ר (Joseph, son of Rabbi) גרשום (Gershom) נפטר (Passed away) ביום (on the day of) כ' (20th of) אייר (May) שנת (in the year) תרנ"ט (1899) ת'נ'צ'ב'ה (May his soul be bound in the bond of eternal life).

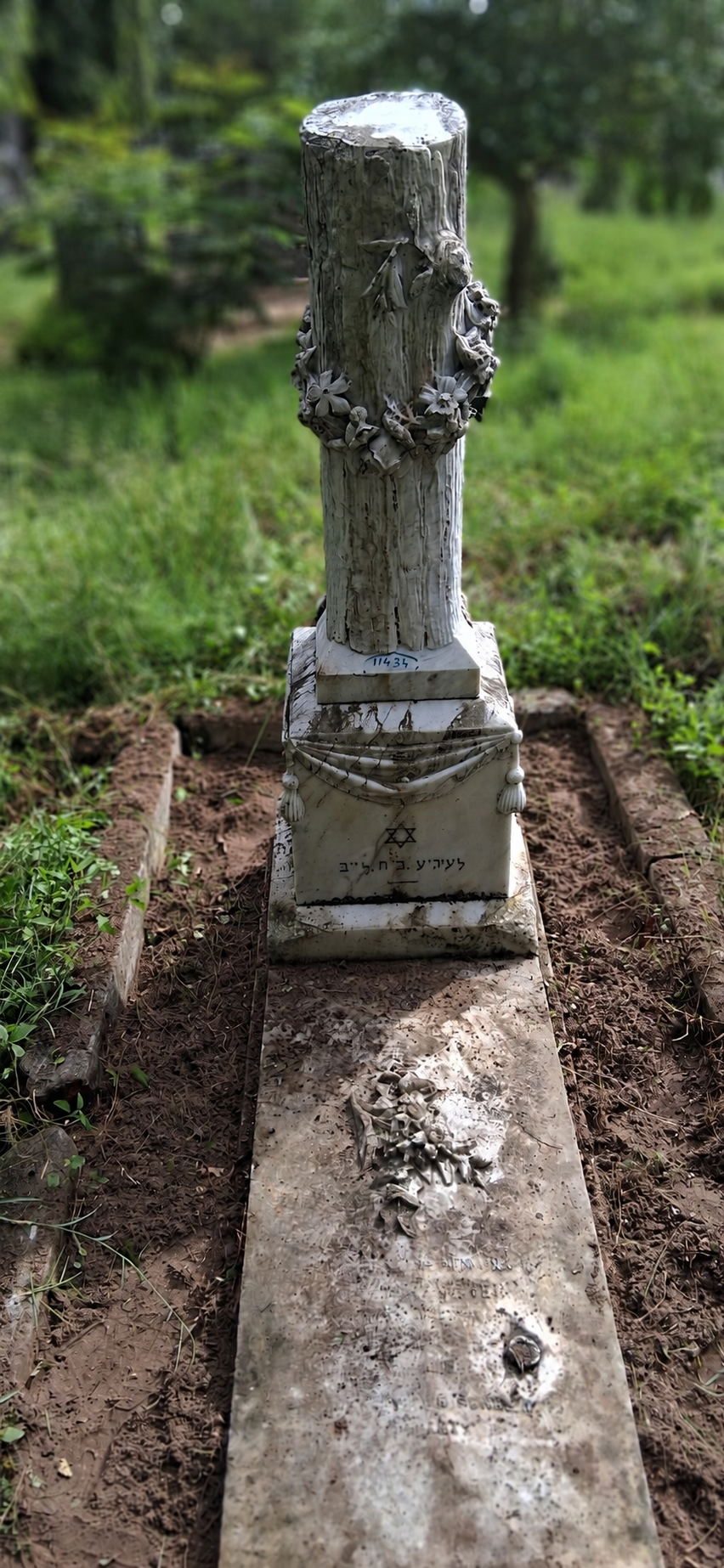
Grave of a Jewish girl named Leah Feinstein, daughter of Rabbi Leib. She was born in 1901 and died in 1908.

The known history of the Jews in Sri Lanka (formerly Ceylon) begins at least in the ninth century CE. Jews living in the neighbouring Kerala as well as Yemen had connections with those living on the island.

== Ancient history ==
Jews have had a presence on the island nation since at least the 9th century or even earlier. Sri Lanka was already known to Jews living in Kerala as early as the 3rd century BC. Yemeni Jewish traders used to visit Sri Lanka for trade. In the 10th century, Abu Zeid al Hasan, an Arab Muslim traveller from Siraf, Persia, stated that there were "a great number of Jews" in Serendib, as Sri Lanka was known to the Arabs.

It has also been said that Jewish links with Sri Lanka could go back thousands of years. The city of Galle in southern Sri Lanka was said to be the biblical Tarshish where King Solomon, in 1000 BCE, once shipped elephants, apes, peacocks, jewels and spices. Cinnamon was exported from 1500 BCE.

== Modern history ==
In the 12th century, Benjamin of Tudela, a Sephardi Jew (Jews of Spanish and Portuguese descent) who was a medieval adventurer from Navarre, in present-day Spain, reported that there were 3,000 Jews in Sri Lanka.

These early Jews in Sri Lanka either assimilated into the local population over the centuries, or, upon the arrival of the Portuguese in the early 16th century, were forced to abandon their faith and identity (leading to an assimilation in more recent centuries) or slaughtered in an extension of the Portuguese Inquisition.

Neither practising Jews, nor people who preserved a knowledge of being descendants of Jews, appear to have survived from that early period, although Jewish lineages may be present. Holders of the "de Fonseka" and the "de Alwis" surname in Sri Lanka may be the mixed descendants of "[Fonseca, de Olivera (surname)" surnamed people, which is commonly associated with Sephardi Portuguese Jewish origins. The other famous known Jewish origin descendants would be the "Alkegamas". Their history could also be traced back all the way down to the colonial times in Ceylon.

Contrary to the enumeration of Jews in the colonial census records of the neighbouring British India and their larger numbers, there was no big Jewish community on record in British Ceylon. The colonial census of 1911 recorded only eight Jews living on the island. In Ceylon, Jewish administrators did not play a significant role unlike India. An important exception was Leonard Woolf, who worked in the Ceylon Civil Service between 1904 and 1911. However, Woolf was a known atheist and anti-religious during his time in the country.

Their rituals and practices have mixed Hindu and Jewish elements and this can be witnessed in their marriages but as the community slowly thins out the Hindu element has taken prominence over the Jewish. Dr. Fiona Kumari Campbell, Deshamanya Tissa Devendra, Dr. Tuan Zameer Careem Khan and Avi Kumar are among the few academics who have done significant researches on the Jewish community in Sri Lanka, while author Carl Muller has researched on the Jewish connection of the Dutch and Portuguese Burghers in Sri Lanka.

== Famous Jews in Sri Lanka ==
- Sir Sidney Abrahams, British-born Chief Justice.
- Rhoda Miller de Silva, American-born journalist and communist (sister of Howard Fast).
- Jeanne Hoban Moonesinghe, British-born journalist, trade unionist and Trotskyist (Jewish maternal grandfather)
- Edith Gyömrői Ludowyk, Hungarian-born psychoanalyst, feminist and historian of Buddhism.
- Ven Nyanaponika Thera, (Siegmund Feniger) German-born Sri-Lanka-ordained Theravada Buddhist monk, co-founder of the Buddhist Publication Society
- Anne Ranasinghe, German-born poet.
- Hedi Stadlen Keuneman, Austrian-born musician and communist.
- Bella Sidney Woolf, British-born author, writer of the first pocket guide book to Sri Lanka, wife of Wilfrid Thomas Southorn, sister of Leonard Woolf.
- Leonard Woolf, British-born political theorist, author and civil servant, husband of Virginia Woolf.
- Baron Solomon Benedict de Worms (1801–1882), oversaw large plantations in Sri Lanka with his brothers Maurice and Gabriel.
- Gabriel Benedict de Worms (1802–1881), German-born planter, candidate for the Legislative Council of Ceylon, brother of Maurice Worms, nephew of Nathan Meyer Rothschild.
- Maurice Benedict de Worms (1805–1867), German-born planter, established Rothschild Estate in Sri Lanka, brought first tea plants to Sri Lanka from China, brother of Gabriel Worms, nephew of Nathan Meyer Rothschild.

== See also ==
- History of the Jews in India
