= Worms =

Worms may refer to:

- Worm, an invertebrate animal with a tube-like body and no limbs

== Places ==
- Worms, Germany, a city
  - Worms (electoral district)
- Worms, Nebraska, U.S.
- Worms im Veltlintal, the German name for Bormio, Italy
- Worms, the German name for the Estonian island of Vormsi in the Baltic.

== Arts and entertainment ==
- Worms (film), a 2013 Brazilian animated film
- Worms (series), a series of video games, including:
  - Worms (1995 video game), the first game in the series
  - Worms (2007 video game), for Xbox Live Arcade, PlayStation Network, and iOS
- Worms?, a 1983 computer game
- "Worms" (The Bear), a 2025 TV episode
- "Worms", a song by Ashnikko from Weedkiller, 2023

== Other uses ==
- Worms (infection), common name for Helminthiasis
- Parasitic worms (disambiguation)
- Worms (surname), a surname
- World Register of Marine Species (WoRMS)

== See also ==
- Worm (disambiguation)
- Diet of Worms (disambiguation)
- Worms & Cie, a French paper company
