= Wurm =

Wurm or Würm may refer to:

== Places ==
- Würm (Amper), a river in Bavaria, southeastern Germany
  - Würm glaciation, an Alpine ice age, named after the Bavarian river
- Wurm (Rur), a river in North Rhine-Westphalia in western Germany
- Würm (Nagold), a river in Baden-Württemberg, southwestern Germany
- 1785 Wurm, a main-belt asteroid

== Arts and entertainment ==
- Wurm (dragon) or European dragon, a legendary creature in folklore and mythology
- Wurm Online, a fantasy MMORPG created in 2006
- Wurm (album), a 1997 album by Wolfgang
- Würm (band), an American sludge metal band active in the 1970s and 1980s
- Wurm: Journey to the Center of the Earth, a 1991 video game for the NES
- Wurm, a 1991 novel by Matthew J. Costello
- Wurm, a fictional character in the 1849 opera Luisa Miller by Giuseppe Verdi
- "Würm", the final movement of the 1971 song "Starship Trooper" by Yes

== Other uses ==
- Wurm-thional, a trade name for phenothiazine
- Wurm (surname), people with the surname
- WURM, a 2010 name of WRTO-FM, a radio station in Florida, US

== See also ==
- Worm (disambiguation)
- Wyrm (disambiguation)
- Wurmser (disambiguation)
