= The House of Rothschild =

1934 film by Alfred L. Werker, Sidney Lanfield

- Theatrical release poster
- Directed by: Alfred L. Werker; Maude T. Howell (asst.)
- Written by: George Hembert Westley (playwright); Nunnally Johnson (screenwriter)
- Produced by: William Goetz; Raymond Griffith; Darryl F. Zanuck
- Starring: George Arliss; Loretta Young; Boris Karloff
- Cinematography: J. Peverell Marley
- Edited by: Barbara McLean; Allen McNeil
- Music by: Alfred Newman
- Production company: Twentieth Century Pictures
- Distributed by: United Artists
- Release date: April 7, 1934
- Running time: 88 minutes
- Country: United States
- Language: English
- Box office: $1 million (U.S. and Canada rentals)

The House of Rothschild is a 1934 American pre-Code historical drama film directed by Alfred L. Werker and starring George Arliss, Loretta Young and Boris Karloff. It was adapted by Nunnally Johnson from the play by George Hembert Westley, and chronicles the rise of the Rothschild family of European bankers.

== Plot ==
In 1780 in Frankfurt youngster Nathan Rothschild warns his parents Mayer and Guttle that the taxman is coming. They hurriedly hide their wealth. The taxman demands 20,000 gulden, an exorbitant sum, but accepts a bribe of 5,000 in exchange for assessing them 2,000 in taxes. Mayer's satisfaction is short-lived, however; a courier bringing him 10,000 guldens is intercepted and the money confiscated by the taxmen. Mayer tells his sons that he tries to be as honest as possible, but the authorities will not let him; he admonishes his children to acquire money, for "money is power" and can protect their people.

Later, as Mayer is lying on his deathbed, he instructs his five sons to start banks in different countries across Europe: Amschel in Frankfurt am Main, Salomon in Vienna, Nathan in London, Carl in Naples, and James in Paris. That way, they can avoid having to send gold back and forth when the need arises, for in war they are in danger of being robbed by the enemy and in peace by their own countrymen. Instead, they can draw on each other's banks.

Thirty-two years later, the sons have established banking houses. Then France overruns Europe in the Napoleonic Wars. Austrian Prince Metternich asks Salomon to raise 15 million florins to help defeat Napoleon. The other brothers are approached with similar requests. Even in France itself, Talleyrand asks for 50 million francs. Nathan refuses to loan the British Government five million pounds (on top of previous loans) to hold off the enemy, but offers the Duke of Wellington twice that amount to smash him.

After the war is won, Wellington is disappointed to find that Nathan Rothschild has not even been invited to a party in the duke's honour. He insists on going to see Nathan. His aide, Captain Fitzroy, knows the address, as he and Nathan's daughter Julie are in love. While there, Wellington tells Nathan that the victorious powers are going to make a very large loan to France to help it recover from the war. The winning underwriter will become the most powerful and prestigious bank in Europe.

Nathan's bid is the best, but is rejected primarily in favor of Barings Bank. When Nathan demands to know the reason, Prussian Count Ledrantz (despite having himself sought a war loan from the Rothschilds) explains it was discarded on a "technicality", because Nathan is a Jew. Nathan learns that the quarter of the loan not awarded to Barings will fall to Ledrantz, Metternich and Talleyrand, who stand to make enormous profits. Nathan outmanoeuvres them financially, bringing them to the brink of ruin and dishonour; they capitulate and surrender to him the entire loan. However, this has somewhat embittered him. Where once he accepted Julie's choice, he now tells the non-Jewish Fitzroy to stay away from her.

Anti-Jewish riots break out all over Germany, instigated by Ledrantz. Nathan returns to Frankfurt and, under pressure from his own people, agrees to submit to Ledrantz. However, before he can, he receives word that Napoleon has escaped from exile. Nathan's brothers, fearful of their positions, want to support the restored French Emperor. However, Nathan refuses to do so. With Ledrantz and others once again desperately in need of financial support, he extracts a treaty from them granting Jews rights, freedoms and dignity long denied them. He also tells Fitzroy that he can once again see Julie. With Napoleon seemingly invincible, Nathan determines to risk all in support of the allies. Just before he is bankrupted, he receives word that Wellington has won the Battle of Waterloo, and he is not only saved, he becomes the richest man in the world and a baron.

== Cast ==
- George Arliss as Mayer Rothschild / Nathan Rothschild
- Boris Karloff as Count Ledrantz
- Loretta Young as Julie Rothschild
- Robert Young as Captain Fitzroy
- C. Aubrey Smith as the Duke of Wellington
- Arthur Byron as Baring
- Helen Westley as Gudula Rothschild
- Reginald Owen as Herries
- Florence Arliss as Hannah Rothschild
- Alan Mowbray as Prince Metternich
- Holmes Herbert as Rowerth
- Paul Harvey as Solomon Rothschild
- Ivan Simpson as Amschel Rothschild
- Noel Madison as Carl Rothschild
- Murray Kinnell as James Rothschild
- Oscar Apfel as Prussian Officer
- Lumsden Hare as the Prince Regent
- Brandon Hurst as Stock Trader
- Gilbert Emery as British Prime Minister Lord Liverpool
- C. Montague Shaw as Stock Trader
- Harry Cording as Man (uncredited)
- Nigel De Brulier as Official (uncredited)
- Murdock MacQuarrie as Man at Stock Exchange (uncredited)
- Louis Shapiro as Napoleon Bonaparte (uncredited)

== Background ==
The movie was produced by Zanuck (who was not Jewish), as an attack on Nazism and anti-semitism following Hitler's rise to power in Germany in 1933. The story was suggested to him by George Arliss (also non-Jewish) who had made successful film appearances as Jewish characters like Shylock and Benjamin Disraeli. Arliss was given the dual role of Amschel Rothschild and one of Rothschild's sons, Nathan Mayer, the one who settled in England. Zanuck faced behind-the-scenes opposition from Jewish concerns such as the Anti-Defamation League but the screenplay passed the muster of the Hays Office, one of whose officials, James Wingate, found no cause for objection and even suggested it be shown to a representative of the German government, a step Zanuck refused to take. In December 1933 the project was endorsed in one major Jewish journal, The B'nai B'rith Messenger.

== Cinematography ==
While nearly all of the film is in black and white, its final sequence was one of the first shot in the three-strip Technicolor process, along with the MGM musical The Cat and the Fiddle, released in February 1934.

== Reception ==
The movie had positive reviews from various American journals; although the film made no reference to then-current events in Germany, some critics noticed similarities to the Nazi regime's treatment of German Jews—such as the columnist of Time, who considered it "shrewdly timed to touch obliquely on current Jew-baiting in Germany". It was also publicly endorsed by the National Council of Jewish Women, which helped make it acceptable.

The film was the biggest hit of the year for Twentieth Century Pictures, which had only been formed in June 1933. It was one of United Artists' most popular films of the year. It was nominated for the Academy Award for Best Picture.

In a close contest The House of Rothschild was voted the second best picture of 1934 in Film Daily's annual poll of critics, narrowly edged out by The Barretts of Wimpole Street.

Two scenes from The House of Rothschild were used in the German antisemitic propaganda film The Eternal Jew (1940) without the permission of the copyright holders.

== Historical accuracy ==
The film takes several creative liberties with Rothschild family history. Amschel Rothschild did not die until 1812, during the later stages of the Napoleonic Wars he is portrayed as not having lived to see. Only two of his five sons were actually present at his death bed; the rest were already established in other European countries.

Nathan Rothschild (born 1777) would have been only three years old in 1780, when the film begins. The relationship between Captain Fitzroy and Julie Rothschild is fictional; Nathan Rothschild had no daughter named Julie. The Captain Fitzroy who did become his son-in-law (albeit after Nathan died in 1836) was born in 1807, therefore a child at the time of Waterloo, and married in 1839 Hannah Rothschild, Nathan's second daughter (born 1815).

Also, in the 18th century Frankfurt was a Free City in the Holy Roman Empire. It did not belong to Prussia until 1866.

The Prussian Count Ledrantz, Nathan Mayer's antagonist, was a purely fictional character written into the story by Nunally Johnson.

== See also ==
- List of early color feature films
