= Henry de Worms, 1st Baron Pirbright =

British politician (1840–1903)

The Right Honourable The Lord Pirbright PC, DL, JP, FRS
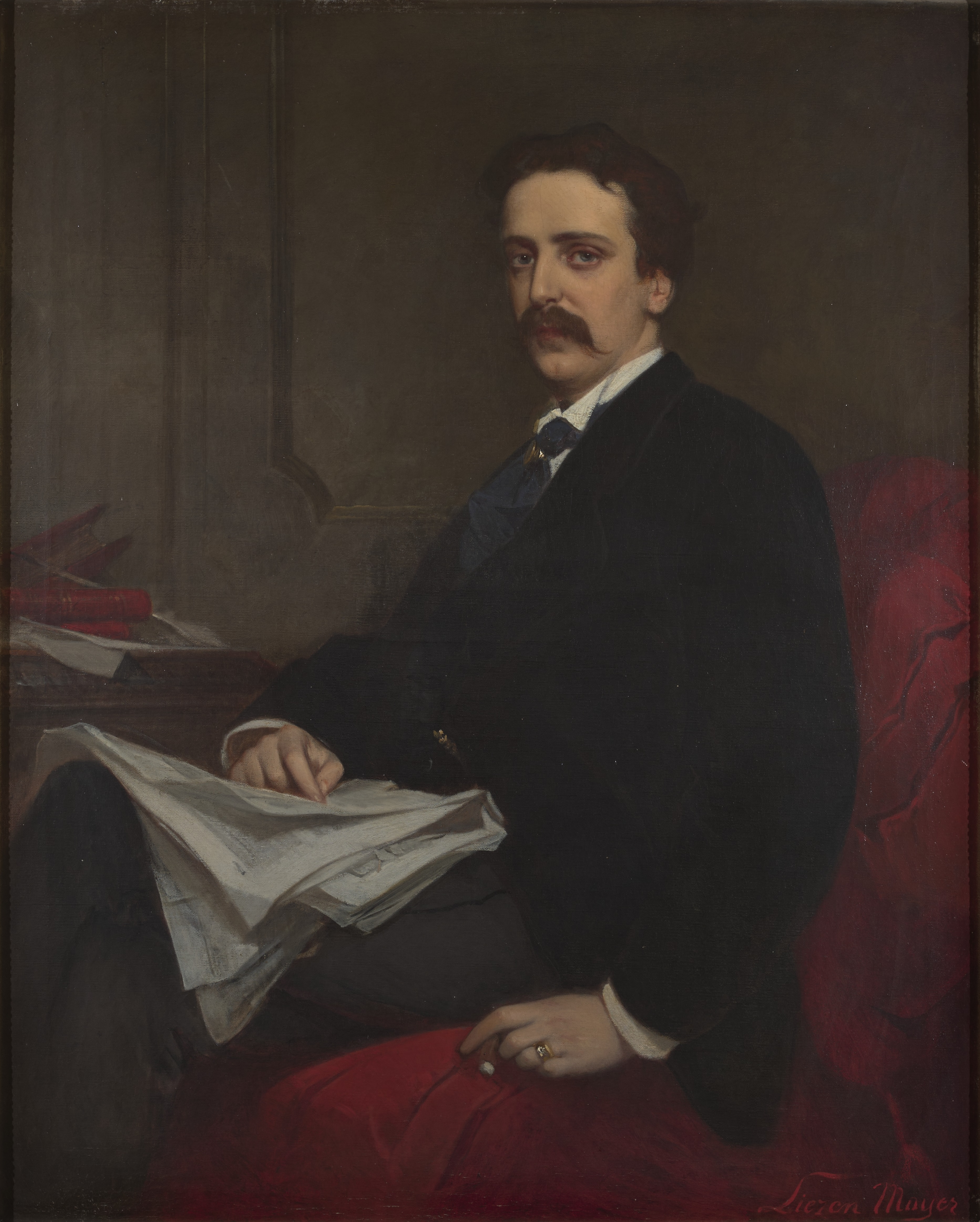

Under-Secretary of State for the Colonies
- In office 20 February 1888 – 1892
- Monarch: Victoria
- Prime Minister: The Marquess of Salisbury
- Preceded by: The Earl of Onslow
- Succeeded by: Sydney Buxton

Personal details
- Born: 26 October 1840 London
- Died: 9 January 1903 (aged 62) London
- Party: Conservative
- Spouse(s): (1) Fanny von Todesco (2) Sarah Phillips (died 1914)
- Education: King's College London

Henry de Worms, 1st Baron Pirbright PC, DL, JP, FRS (20 October 1840 – 9 January 1903), known before his elevation to the peerage in 1895 as Baron Henry de Worms, was a British Conservative politician.

== Background and education ==
Henry de Worms was born in London on 20 October 1840, the third son of Solomon Benedict de Worms. His father owned large plantations in Ceylon and was made a Hereditary Baron of the Austrian Empire by Emperor Franz Joseph I of Austria. His mother was Henrietta Samuel, daughter of Samuel Moses Samuel. His siblings were George de Worms, 2nd Baron de Worms, Anthony Mayer de Worms, and Ellen Henrietta de Worms.

Both on his father's side and on his mother's side he belonged to wealthy mercantile families. His paternal grandmother was Schönche Jeannette Rothschild, thus his paternal great-grandfather was Mayer Amschel Rothschild, the founder of the Rothschild banking dynasty. As a result, his paternal great-granduncles were Amschel Mayer Rothschild, Salomon Mayer von Rothschild, Nathan Mayer Rothschild, Carl Mayer von Rothschild, and James Mayer de Rothschild. His uncles, who owned plantations in Ceylon with his father, were Maurice Benedict de Worms and Gabriel Benedict de Worms. His maternal grandfather was a West Indian merchant, whose fortune Lord Pirbright inherited indirectly through his uncle George Samuel.

He was educated at King's College London. He was called to the Bar, Inner Temple, in 1863, and became a fellow of King's College in the same year.

== Political career ==
De Worms served as Conservative Member of Parliament for Greenwich from 1880 to 1885 and for Liverpool East Toxteth from 1885 to 1895 and held office under Lord Salisbury as Parliamentary Secretary to the Board of Trade from 1886 to 1888 and as Under-Secretary of State for the Colonies from 1888 to 1892.

He was British Plenipotentiary and President of the Conference on Sugar Bounties in 1888, and later served as a Commissioner for the Patriotic Fund. He was appointed a Privy Counsellor in 1888 and raised to the peerage as Baron Pirbright, of Pirbright in the County of Surrey, in 1895. He was elected a Fellow of the Royal Society in 1889.

His publications include England's Policy in the East, The Earth and its Mechanism, The Austro-Hungarian Empire and Memoirs of Count Beust.

Lord Pirbright died at his residence in London on 9 January 1903, aged 62.

== Family ==
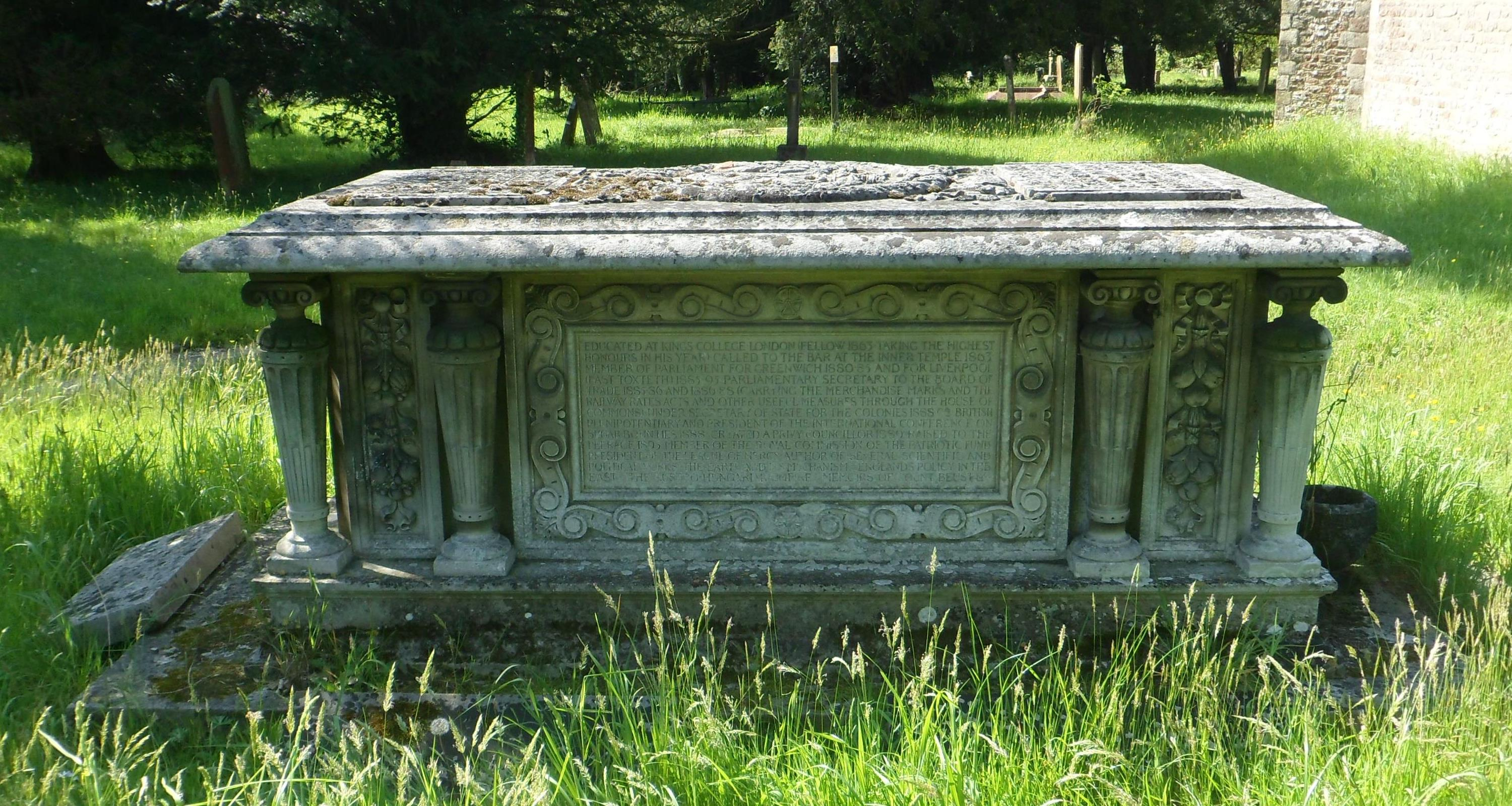
Lord Pirbright's tomb at St Mark's Church, Wyke, Surrey

De Worms married first, in 1864, Franziska "Fanny" von Todesco, eldest daughter of Baron von Todesco, of Vienna. They had three daughters:

- Hon. Alice Henrietta Antoinette Evelina de Worms (1865–1952); married 1st in 1886 John Henry Boyer Warner (d. 1891), of Quorn Hall, Loughborough and Kepwick Park, Northallerton; married 2nd in 1892 David McLaren Morrison; and left several daughters by her second husband.
- Hon. Dora Sophia Emily de Worms (1869–?)
- Hon. Constance Valérie Sophie de Worms (1875–1963); married in 1895 Count Maximilian of Löwenstein-Scharffeneck, a nephew of Wilhelm, Prince of Löwenstein-Wertheim-Freudenberg. They had several children, including Hubertus, Prince of Löwenstein-Wertheim-Freudenberg, and she was thus the grandmother of Prince Rupert Loewenstein, manager of the rock band The Rolling Stones.

He divorced his first wife in 1886, and married secondly in 1887 Sarah Phillips, daughter of Sir Benjamin Samuel Phillips, and sister of Sir George Faudel Phillips, 1st Baronet. Both her father and her brother served as Lord Mayors of London. Sarah, Lady Pirbright was appointed a Lady of Grace of the Venerable Order of St John of Jerusalem on 5 March 1903.

Born Jewish, he was an active member of the Jewish community until he married a Christian woman. He then dissociated himself entirely from Judaism, and was buried at the Christian cemetery of St. Mark's in Wyke, Surrey.

The barony became extinct on his death as he had no sons. His second wife Lady Pirbright died in November 1914.

Parliament of the United Kingdom
Preceded by Thomas Boord; William Ewart Gladstone	Member of Parliament for Greenwich; 1880 – 1885; With: Thomas Boord	Succeeded by Thomas Boord
New constituency	Member of Parliament for Liverpool East Toxteth; 1885 – 1895	Succeeded by Augustus Frederick Warr
Political offices
Preceded by John Holms	Parliamentary Secretary to the Board of Trade; 1885 – 1888	Succeeded by The Earl of Onslow
Preceded by The Earl of Onslow	Under-Secretary of State for the Colonies; 1888 – 1892	Succeeded by Sydney Buxton
Peerage of the United Kingdom
New creation	Baron Pirbright; 1895 – 1903	Extinct
