= Worm (disambiguation) =

A worm is an animal with a long cylindrical tube-like body and no limbs.

Worm, The Worm or WORM may also refer to:

== Arts and entertainment ==
=== Fictional characters ===
- Worm, a fictional Marvel Comics character in the Savage Land Mutates group
- Worm, a fictional villain in the Kamen Rider Kabuto TV series
- WORM, a fictional character in the anime Sky Girls
- King Worm, a character who first appeared in the episode "Evicted!" of the animated series Adventure Time
- Worm, or wyrm, a Germanic term for a dragon

=== Film ===
- Worm (2006 film), a Russian drama film
- Worm (2013 film), an American sci-fi film

=== Music ===
- The Worm (Jimmy McGriff album), 1968
- "Worm", a song by Ministry from the 2004 album Houses of the Molé
- "The Worm", a song by Audioslave from the 2005 album Out of Exile
- The Worm (HMLTD album), 2023
- Worm (instrument), a soprano serpent

=== Other uses in arts and entertainment ===
- Worm, a 1988 novel by John Brosnan
- Worm, The First Digital World War, a 2010 non-fiction book by Mark Bowden
- Worm (dance move), associated with breakdancing
- Worm (web serial), self-published by John C. "Wildbow" McCrae

== Business and organizations ==
- WORM (AM), AM radio station in Savannah, Tennessee, U.S.
- WORM-FM, FM radio station in Savannah, Tennessee, U.S.
- Worm (marketing), a market-research analysis tool
- WORM (Rotterdam), a non-profit foundation in the Netherlands

== People ==
- Worm (surname), includes list of people with the surname
- Dennis Rodman (born 1961), nicknamed "The Worm", an American basketball player
- Mike Veisor (born 1952), nicknamed "Worm", a Canadian ice hockey player
- Corey Perry (born 1985), nicknamed "The Worm", a Canadian ice hockey player
- Worm Hirsch Darre-Jenssen (1870–1945), Norwegian engineer and politician
- Worm, a nickname for a junior oilfield roughneck
- Pete "PP" Worm, (born 1990), nicknamed "Worm", Croatian amateur gamer

== Computing ==
- Computer worm, a standalone malware computer program that replicates itself
- Worm memory test, a type of memory test in computing
- Write once read many (WORM), a type of data storage device

== Other technology ==
- Worm drive, a gear arrangement in which a worm meshes with a worm gear
- Worm (artillery), device used to remove unspent powder bag remnants from a cannon
- Worm, a coiled tube used to cool the vapour produced from a pot still

== Other uses ==
- Parasitic worm, a large macroparasite
- The Worm, nickname for a former NASA insignia

== See also ==
- Worms (disambiguation)
- Wurm (disambiguation)
- Wyrm (disambiguation)
