= Rothschild Park =

Rothschild Park may refer to:

- Rothschild Park (Frankfurt) in Frankfurt, Germany
- Rothschild Park (Baynton) in Baynton, Australia
- Rothschild Park (Mount Carmel), also known as Ramat HaNadiv and Gardens of Baron Edmond de Rothschild in Mount Carmel, Israel
- Parc de Boulogne Edmond de Rothschild near Bois de Boulogne, France
