= Charles de Worms =

English chemist & lepidopterist (1903–1979)

- Born: 19 January 1903; London, England
- Died: 10 October 1979 (aged 76)
- Education: Eton College; King's College, Cambridge
- Occupations: Chemist; Lepidopterist
- Parent(s): Anthony Denis Maurice George de Worms; Louisa Matilda Goldsmidt
- Relatives: Mayer Amschel Rothschild (paternal great-great-great-grandfather); Solomon Benedict de Worms (paternal great-grandfather)

Baron Charles George Maurice de Worms (19 January 1903 – 10 October 1979) was an English chemist and lepidopterist.

== Biography ==
=== Early life ===
Charles de Worms was born in Park Lane, London on 19 January 1903, the son of Baron Anthony Denis Maurice George de Worms (1869–1938) and Louisa Matilda Goldscmidt. His interest in lepidoptera began in his childhood. He was also interested in ornithology.

=== Education and chemistry career ===
He was educated at Eton College and King's College, Cambridge, where he was awarded the Drewitt Prize for Agricultural Chemistry.

He received his Ph.D. from London University in 1934 with a thesis on orthodiphenyl ethers.

=== Career ===
De Worms worked as a research chemist at the Institute of the Royal Cancer Hospital and later was in charge of a chemical research laboratory at the Porton Down Experimental Station.. He published several hundred articles and notes in periodicals and entomological congresses, namely in The Entomologist's Record and Journal of Variation and the Entomologist's Gazette.

In 1962 he published The Macrolepidoptera of Wiltshire. He later published The Butterflies and Moths of London and Its Surroundings followed by various supplements (1954-1960).

De Worms was an extensive traveller, collecting lepidoptera in Europe, North Africa, Australia, the West Indies and Canada. He was a Fellow of the Royal Entomological Society of London and a member of both the London Natural History Society and the British Entomological and Natural History Society.

After his death, most of his collection of specimens was bequeathed to the Royal Scottish Museum (now the National Museum of Scotland) and his natural history library to the British Entomological and Natural History Society.
