= Worming =

Worming may refer to:

- Deworming, the giving of an anthelmintic drug to a human or animal to rid them of internal parasites, including helminths
- Oculolinctus, eyeball licking
- Worm, parcel and serve, the act of applying protection to standing rigging on a boat

== See also ==
- Worm (disambiguation)
