= Wyrm =

Wyrm may refer to:

== Folklore ==
- Germanic dragon, a creature from which the modern word originated
- Dragon
- Sea serpent

== Media ==
- Wyrms (comics), a six-issue comic book mini-series by Orson Scott Card and Jake Black
- Wyrm (film), a 2019 American comedy film
- Wyrms (novel), a 1987 science fiction novel by Orson Scott Card
- Wyrm (TMNT), a mutated garbageman in Teenage Mutant Ninja Turtles
- Wyrm (World of Darkness), the bringer of the apocalypse in the role-playing game Werewolf: The Apocalypse
- WTJZ (AM), a Norfolk, Virginia radio station (former callsign WYRM)

== See also ==
- Wurm (disambiguation)
