= Amschel Moses Rothschild =

German Jewish money changer (c.1710–1755)

- Born: c. 1710
- Died: 6 October 1755 (aged 44–45); Free City of Frankfurt, Holy Roman Empire
- Spouse: Schönche Lechnich (d. 1756)
- Children: 8, including Mayer Amschel Rothschild
- Parent(s): Moses Kalman Rothschild; Schönche Buchsbaum

Amschel Moses Rothschild (c. 1710 – 6 October 1755) was a German Jewish money changer and trader in silk cloth in the Judengasse, the Jewish ghetto of the Free City of Frankfurt of the Holy Roman Empire, now in Germany. His son Mayer Amschel Rothschild became the progenitor of the Rothschild dynasty.

== Life ==
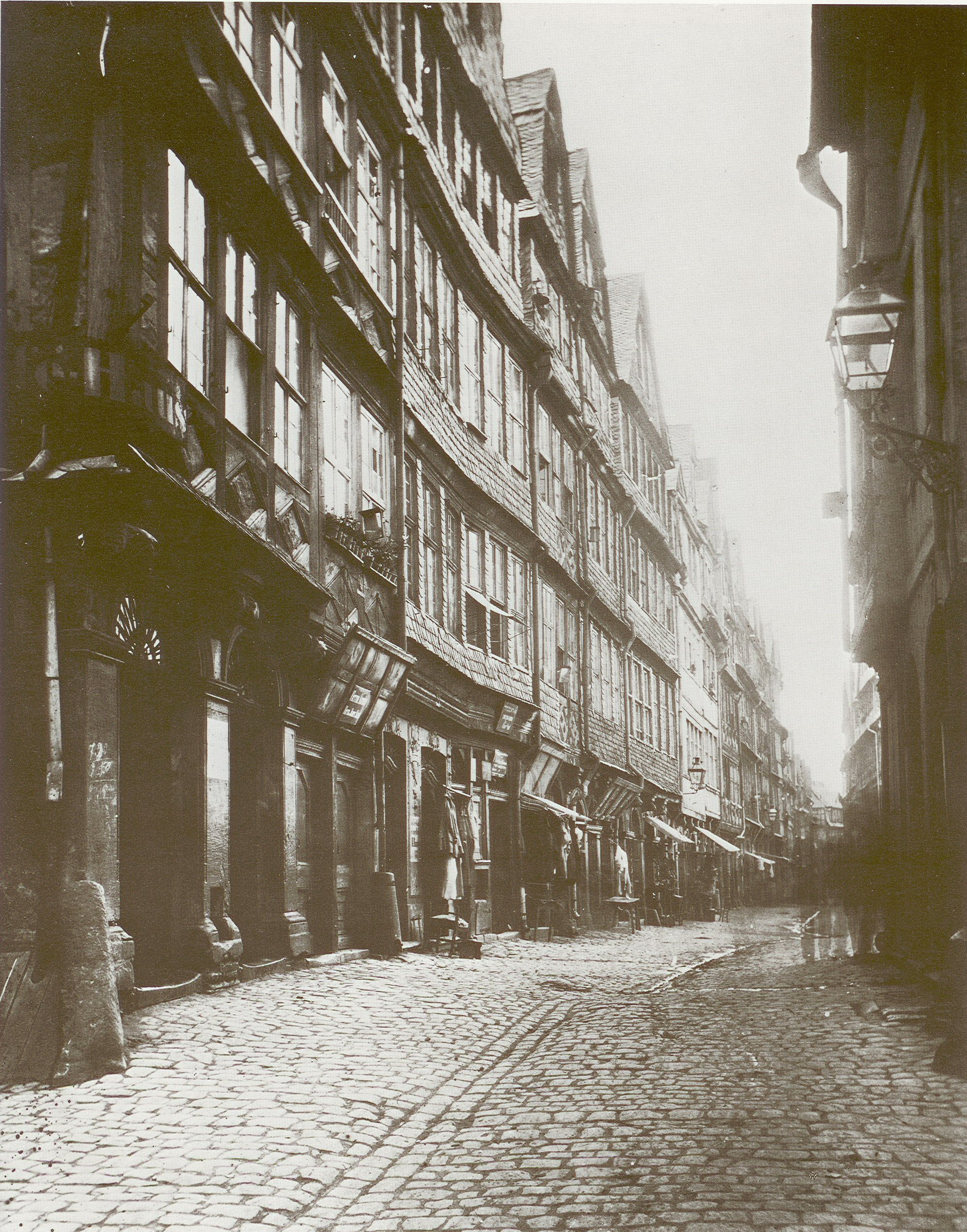
Frankfurt Judengasse (1868)

Amschel Moses Rothschild was born about 1710, the son of Moses Kalman Rothschild (d. 19 October 1735). The Frankfurt ghetto had been established in 1462 by the intervention of Emperor Frederick III; the first known members of the family lived on No. 69 Judengasse in a house called zum Rot(h)en Schild (German for "Red Shield" though the name Rothschild means Red Coat, as in coat-of-arms, in the Yiddish language). Isaak Elchanan Bacharach (d. 1585) had the building erected about 1567 and began to use the name "Rothschild", which his descendants kept even after they moved to No. 188 in a rear building called zur Pfanne ("Pan") in 1664.

Rothschild had a small shop, according to a 1749 tax register his assets amounted to the rather large sum of 1,375 guilders. He married Schönche Lechnich (died 29 June 1756). They had eight children, of whom five survived into adulthood. Rothschild's sons attended the Frankfurt cheder, notably the fourth son, Mayer Amschel Rothschild (1744–1812), was sent to the yeshiva in Fürth but had to abandon his studies upon the early death of his parents. He went on to be the founder of the Rothschild international banking dynasty.

Amschel Moses Rothschild died in a smallpox epidemic in the Frankfurt ghetto in 1755. He was buried in the Frankfurt Battonnstraße cemetery.

== Sources ==
- Amos Elon (1996). Founder: Meyer Amschel Rothschild and His Time. HarperCollins. ISBN 978-0-00-255706-1.
