= Mathieu Georges Dairnvaell =

French satirist and pamphleteer (1818–1854)

Mathieu Georges Dairnvaell (born Mathieu Georges February 2, 1818, Marseille; - 18 May 1854) was a French journalist and pamphleteer using the pen name Satan, publishing during the years 1838 to 1851. In 1846 he published a 36-page pamphlet launching the antisemitic canard that the fabulous wealth of the Rothschild banking dynasty was amassed by Nathan Rothschild through obtaining advance knowledge of the outcome of the Battle of Waterloo (1815) and using this information to successfully play the stock market. In this way, Dairnvaell contributed to the rise of what Michel Dreyfus has called "economic antisemitism".

In a Chartist newspaper, Friedrich Engels recommends Dairnvaell for having started "a new mode of attack" against financiers, in which "King Rothschild has been obliged to publish two defenses against these attacks of a man whom nobody knows, and the whole of whose property consists in the suit of clothes he wears."

== Biography ==
His parents are unknown. Commenting on his unusual name, Claude Pichois points out that "Dairnvaell" published his pamphlets under numerous pseudonyms, the most persistent of which, "Dairnvaell", has multiple spellings (Dairnvæll, Dairnwoel, Dairnwœll, etc.); furthermore "Mathieu Georges" is possibly derived from an English name. As a boy, he studied in one of the best boarding-schools in the Midi, usually as the poorest student. His first published work was a republican satire entitled Les Moscoviennes, dedicated to Nicholas I of Russia. He followed this with two more satires, La Naissande d'un prince and Euménides. He then became a member of the editorial staff of the Indicateur of Marseille, contributing many articles on theater and the works of Shakespeare. In 1839 he published a 64-page novelette, Simon Maurice, or, noble and peasant. He claims to have been editor-in-chief of Corsaire du Midi for two years.

Towards the end of 1840, Dairnvaell went to Paris, and began to publish a series of pamphlets on people, doings, and signs of the times, which he continued until December 2, 1851. In addition to the number of pamphlets that can be traced to him, there are likely many more written anonymously or under pseudonyms; in any case, they are of the moment and cramped.

Dairnvaell, who described himself as "a writer without name, position, title or rank, not even a Chevalier de la Légion d’honneur or a member of the French Academy, an obscure scribbler," never rose above the level of obscurity, but his Waterloo canard has taken on a life of its own.

== Battle of Waterloo canard ==
=== Derailment at Fampoux ===
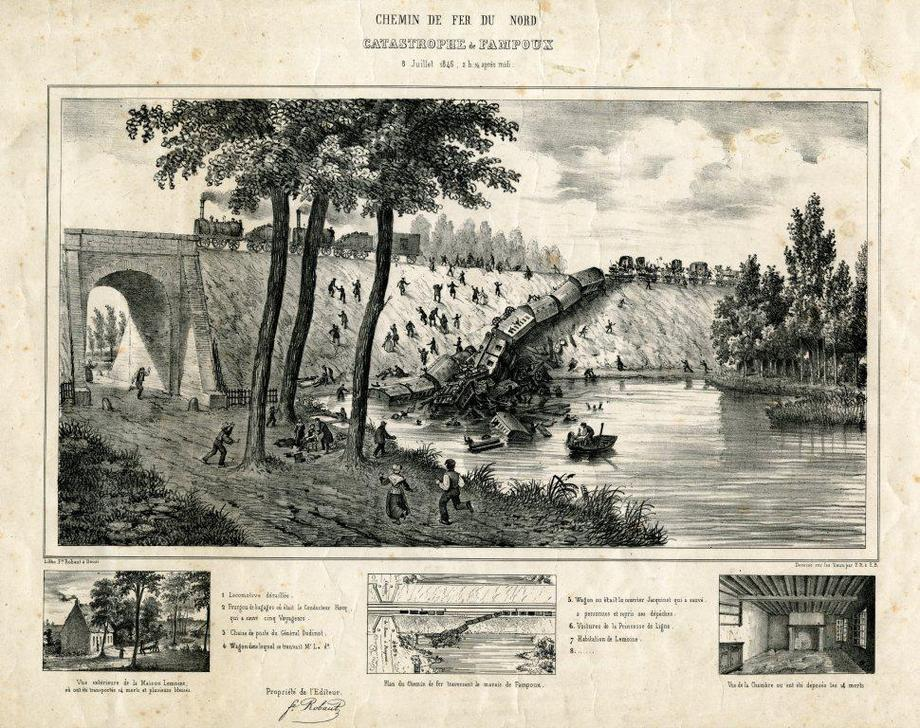
Lithograph by Félix Robaut (1799–1880)

On July 8, 1846, a train on the Northern Line, for which the de Rothschild Frères were the largest investors, derailed while passing through a marsh near the village of Fampoux, killing 57 people and wounding over 100 (Accident ferroviaire de Fampoux). A satirical magazine, Le Charivari, published an article nine days later linking responsibility to the rail system, the Stock Exchange, and Baron James de Rothschild.

=== Pamphleteers fan public anger ===
Taking advantage of widespread outrage over the derailment, Dairnvaell wrote the first of what would be four pamphlets published in 1846 against Rothschild banking interests, entitled Histoire édifiante et curieuse de Rothschild Ier, Roi des Juifs (The Edifying and Curious History of Rothschild the First, King of the Jews) (36 pages). Baron James promptly responded with a pamphlet, also 36 pages, entitled Réponse de Rothschild I roi des juifs à Satan dernier, roi des imposteurs (The Response of Rothschild the First, King of the Jews, to Satan the Last, King of Impostors), the opening round of the pamphlet war closely followed by Friedrich Engels.

=== Dairnvaell's Waterloo narrative ===
According to Dairnvaell's dramatic, but unsubstantiated account, Nathan Rothschild was personally in Belgium observing the Battle of Waterloo. As soon as he realized that Wellington's victory was certain, he hurried to Ostend, but the sailors were unwilling to ferry him across the North Sea, because a storm was brewing. A large amount of gold changed hands before they were willing to take him to England, and he arrived in London 24 hours in advance of Wellington's messenger. Taking advantage of this, Nathan and his brothers made "twenty million" (assume francs; one million sterling), by first selling government consols cheaply, as though they had knowledge of a French victory, and once the prices had dropped, making massive purchases. Consol bonds were the most common investment instrument in Paris at that time.

=== Elaborations of the Waterloo narrative ===
The Waterloo canard became more believable when, instead of Nathan Mayer Rothschild being at Waterloo in person, the news of Wellington's victory is sent by carrier pigeon, or by horseback, with a skipper already under contract and waiting with a ship to ferry the courier across the North Sea. That the Rothschilds had their own courier system was well known, and this story would seem to be a prime example of that.

The story is also told in a version in which economist David Ricardo was the beneficiary of advance news, which he used to amass a fortune on the stock exchange. This version was believed in by Nobel Laureate in Economic Sciences, Paul Samuelson.

== Works ==
- Les Moscoviennes (1838)
- Prédictions du grand Abracadabra découvert par Vitor Hugo (1842; first edition seized, the second contains biographies, chansons, and satires)
- Les Indiscrétions de Lucifer, écrites sous sa dictée par son secrétaire intime (1842)
- Histoire édifiante et curieuse de Rothschild Ier, Roi des Juifs. (1846)
- Code des Jésuites, d’après plus de trois cents ouvrages des casuistes jésuites, complément indispensable aux œuvres de MM. Michelet et Quinet. (1846)
- Les Scandales du jour (1846); reprinted as Les Ministres jugé par Satan.
- Biographie impartiale de M. Despans-Cubières, Lieutenant-général, Pair de France, ancien Ministre: Suivie de ses lettres à M. Parmentier au sujet des mines de Gouhenans, et de la biographie de M. Teste (1847)
- Physiologie des étudiants, des grisettes et des bals de Paris (1849)
- Biographie satirique de la nouvelle chambre des députés (1846-1851): Par Satan (1851)

== See also ==
- The banality of evil
