= Percy de Worms =

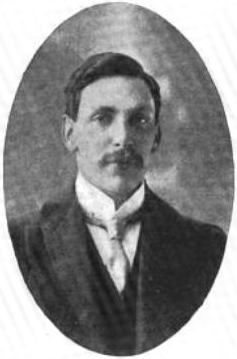
- In The Sketch, 1 August 1900
- Born: 3 November 1873
- Died: 2 April 1941 (aged 67)
- Occupation: Philatelist
- Spouse: Nora Samuel
- Parent(s): George de Worms, 2nd Baron de Worms; Louisa de Samuel
- Relatives: Mayer Amschel Rothschild (paternal great-great-grandfather); Solomon Benedict de Worms (paternal grandfather)

Percy George de Worms (3 November 1873 – 2 April 1941) was an English aristocrat and philatelist.

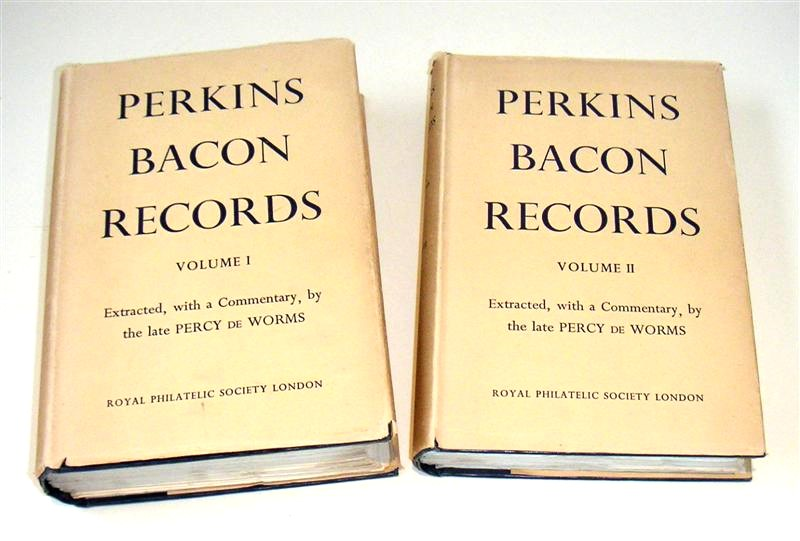
Perkins Bacon Records by Percy de Worms

== Biography ==
=== Early life ===
Percy George de Worms was born on 3 November 1873. His paternal grandfather was Solomon Benedict de Worms (1801–1882), who owned large plantations in Ceylon and was made a Hereditary Baron of the Austrian Empire by Franz Joseph I of Austria (1830–1916), and his paternal grandmother was Henrietta Samuel. His family was Jewish.

=== Career ===
He was a barrister by profession.

=== Philatelic life ===
He was prominent in the Royal Philatelic Society London where he was a member of the Council and the Expert Committee. In 1927, he won the society's Tapling Medal for his paper "The Local Surcharges of Ceylon 1885" published in The London Philatelist which was judged the best of the year. A year later, in 1928, he was invited to sign the Roll of Distinguished Philatelists. He also served as the Honorary Librarian there between 1935 and 1941.

He was an expert on the stamps of Ceylon, to which Sir John Wilson said every philatelic conversation with him eventually led. The de Worms family had interests in coffee estates in Ceylon.

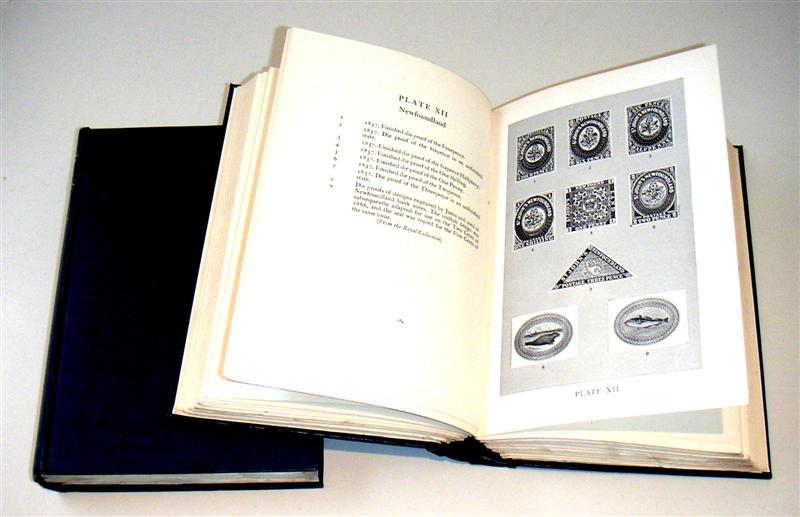
Typical pages from Perkins Bacon Records.

In 1935, the printing firm of Perkins Bacon, notable for the Penny Black and numerous other issues, went out of business and its records were acquired by Charles and Harry Nissen and Thomas Allen. The records were subsequently transferred to the Royal Philatelic Society London and in January 1936 around fifty packing cases of records were delivered to the Royal. De Worms was given the task of reviewing the records to ascertain their philatelic value. This was completed by 1937 and a decision was taken to publish the records of the 19th century by 1940. The detailed nature of the records, the Second World War and de Worms' death in 1941 all conspired to prevent this and it was not until 1953 that the records were eventually published in an authoritative two-volume work of over 900 pages. The work de Worms compiled was one of meticulous philatelic scholarship and in the foreword to the published edition, Sir John Wilson commented that "Possibly nobody but de Worms would have had the courage to attempt it..." .

=== Personal life ===
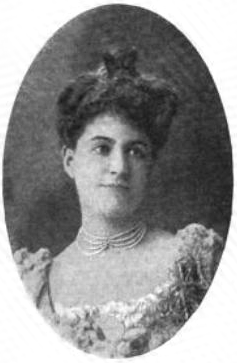
Nora Samuel

He married Nora, only daughter of Sir Harry Simon Samuel MP on 25 July 1900. They had one son and one daughter (b. 1902).

== Publications ==
- The Royal Philatelic Society, London: 1869 - April 10, 1919, Royal Philatelic Society London, 1919.
- "The Foreign Bill Stamps Produced by Messrs. Perkins, Bacon & Co." in The Bulletin, Fiscal Philatelic Society, Vol.II, No.8, December 1925.
- "The Local Surcharges of Ceylon 1885" in The London Philatelist, 1927.
- "Ceylon" in the Regent Stamp Catalogue, Robson Lowe, London. (Editor)
- Perkins Bacon Records, Royal Philatelic Society London, 1953. (Two volumes published posthumously. Edited by John Easton and Arnold Strange)
