= Maurice Benedict de Worms =

Austrian aristocrat & businessman (1805–1867)

- Born: 1805; Frankfurt, Germany
- Died: 1867 (aged 61–62); London, England
- Occupation: Plantation owner
- Parent(s): Benedikt Moses Worms; Schönche Jeannette Rothschild
- Relatives: Mayer Amschel Rothschild (maternal grandfather)

Maurice Benedict de Worms (1805–1867) was an Austrian plantation owner in Ceylon.

== Biography ==
=== Early life ===
Maurice Benedict de Worms was born in 1805 in Frankfurt, Germany. His father was Benedikt Moses Worms (1769–1824) and his mother, Schönche Jeannette Rothschild (1771–1859). He had two brothers, Baron Solomon Benedict de Worms (1801–1882) and Gabriel Benedict de Worms (1802–1881), and one sister, Henriette Worms (1803–1879).

His maternal grandfather was Mayer Amschel Rothschild (1744–1812), the founder of the Rothschild banking dynasty. As a result, his maternal uncles were Amschel Mayer Rothschild (1773–1855), Salomon Mayer von Rothschild (1774–1855), Nathan Mayer Rothschild (1777–1836), Carl Mayer von Rothschild (1788–1855), James Mayer de Rothschild (1792–1868), and his maternal aunts, Isabella Rothschild (1781–1861), Babette Rothschild (1784–1869), Julie Rothschild (1790–1815) and Henriette Rothschild (1791–1866).

=== Career ===
Together with his brother Gabriel, he travelled to the Far East in 1841 and purchased a plantation in Ceylon. Their other brother, Solomon, also invested in the plantation. Over the years, they acquired 2,000 acres under cultivation, and more than 6,000 acres of forest land. It came to be known as the Rothschild Estate. They also owned the Sogamma and Condegalla estates in Pussellawa. They grew coffee and tea, especially Ceylon Tea. They sold the plantations in 1865.

His business was succeeded by Henry de Worms, 1st Baron Pirbright.

=== Death ===
He died in 1867 in London. His will included large donations to Jewish organizations.
