= Rothschild Park (Frankfurt) =

Park in Frankfurt am Main, Germany

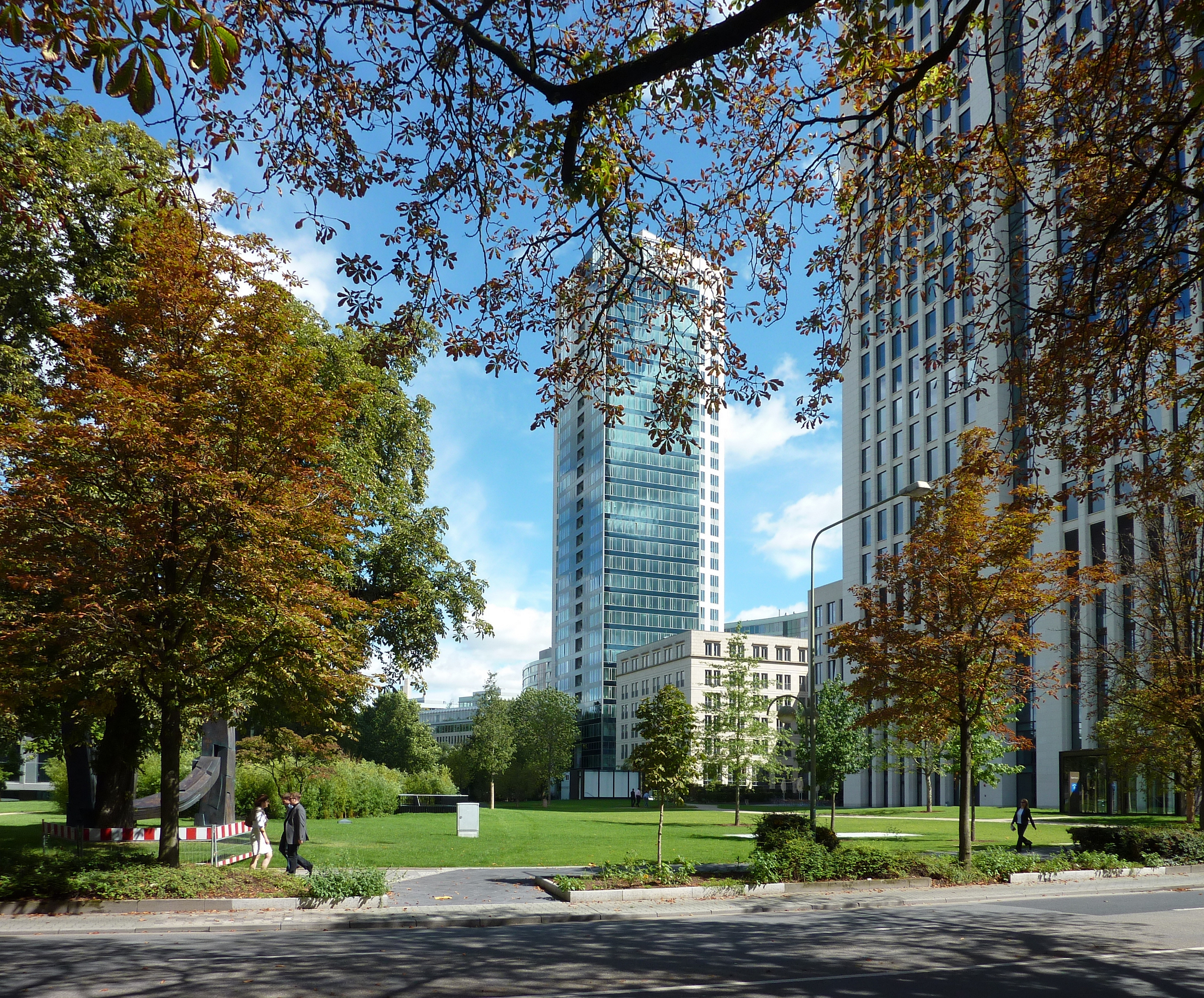
- Rothschild Park

- Location within Germany
- Location: Frankfurt, Germany
- Coordinates: 50.1179°N 8.6699°E

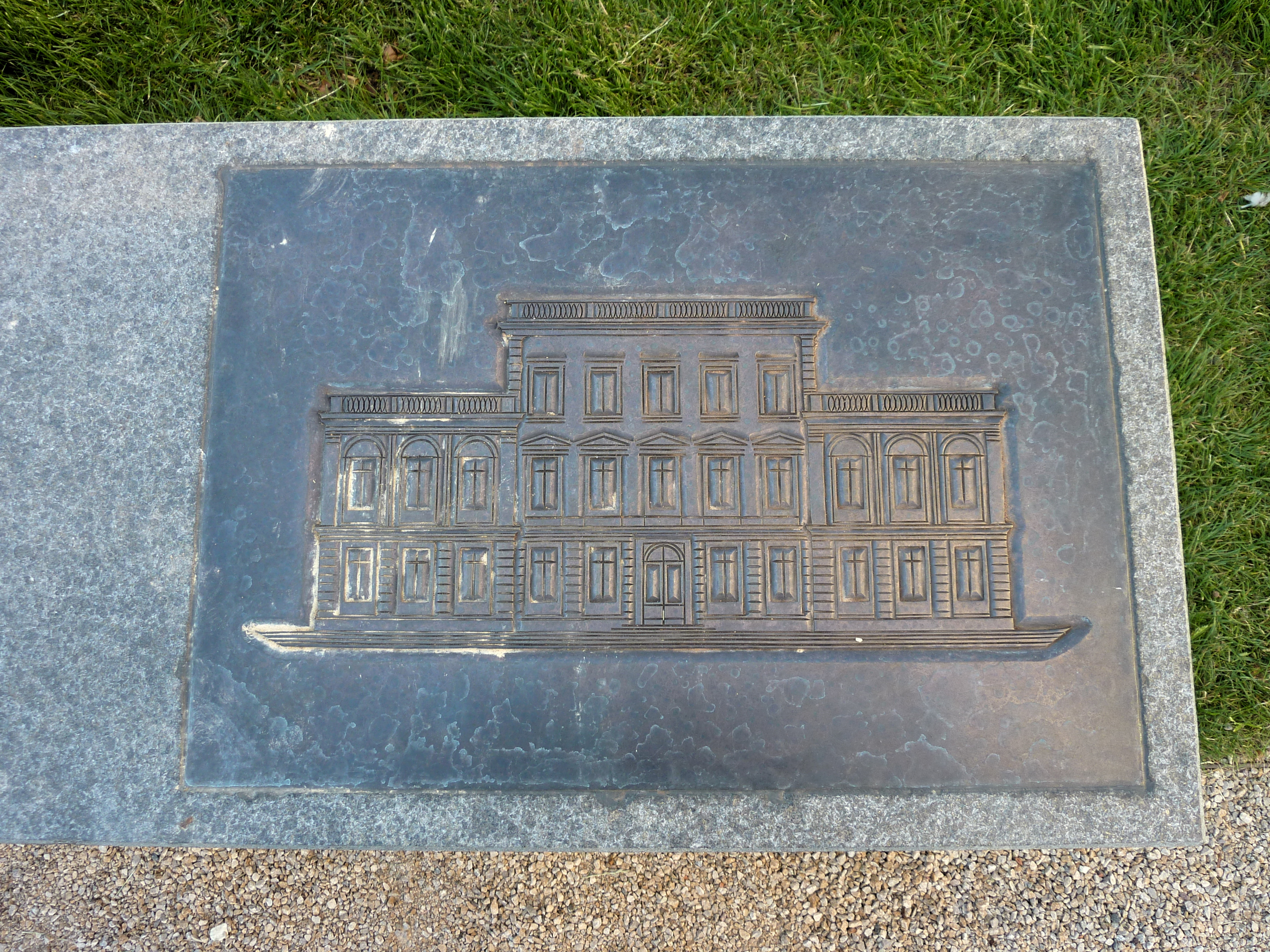
Plaque in Rothschild Park depicting the former Rothschild-Palais

Rothschild Park (German: Rothschildpark) is a public park in Frankfurt, Germany. It is located within the central business district known as the Bankenviertel, to the north of the Opera Tower, adjacent to the Opera Square. The park is named for the Rothschild family, a banking family originating in Frankfurt.

The history of the park dates back to 1810, when Amschel Mayer Rothschild bought a country house with a plot of land in the area. From 1830 the house was extended to a Palais, a stately home, by the Rothschild family. From 1832 the surrounding property was developed as a park in the style of an English landscape garden. The park and the palace were further extended by Baron Wilhelm Carl von Rothschild in 1869/1870. The Rothschild Palace was destroyed by the English during a raid in 1943. Since 1950 the property has been owned by the city of Frankfurt. The park is currently smaller than the original, as parts of it has been sold for property development.
