= Wyrms (novel) =

1987 novel by Orson Scott Card

- First edition
- Author: Orson Scott Card
- Cover artist: Vincent Di Fate
- Language: English
- Genre: Science fiction
- Published: 1987 (Arbor House)
- Publication place: United States
- Media type: Print (hardback & paperback)
- Pages: 263
- ISBN: 0-7653-0560-7
- OCLC: 51022586

Wyrms (1987) is a science fiction novel by American writer Orson Scott Card. The story examines desire, wisdom, and human will. Card describes a version of the tri-partite soul, similar to that articulated by Plato in the Republic.

== Plot introduction ==
The primary protagonist in the story is Patience, a fifteen-year-old girl who is the only daughter of the rightful king (the Heptarch). Her father, Peace, willingly lives as a slave to the usurper King Oruc, serving him as a faithful diplomat and assassin. Despite his genuine belief that King Oruc is "the best Heptarch the world could hope for at this time", Peace ensures that Patience learns the skills she will need as future Heptarch through the stern lessons of her tutor Angel. From an early age, Patience is fluent in dozens of languages, trained in diplomatic protocols and assassination techniques, and taught to be guarded and watchful at all times.

When she is thirteen, Patience learns of an ancient prophecy that – as the seventh seventh seventh daughter of the Starship Captain, the first human to set foot on their planet of Imakulata – she is destined to give birth to Kristos, who will bring either eternal salvation or eternal destruction to the world. An entire religion has been constructed around the legends of the Starship Captain and his descendants. Thousands of people, called Vigilants, stand ready to aid Patience in reclaiming the Heptarchy and fulfilling the prophecy at the center of their religion.

== Plot summary ==
King Oruc, fearing Patience or Peace could be a danger to his reign, keeps them under control by allowing only one of them to leave the castle at a time. However, this delicate hostage situation falls apart when Peace becomes ill. Before he dies, Patience cuts into Peace's shoulder to retrieve a crystal globe hidden under his skin. "The scepter of the Heptarchs," he says. "Never let a gebling know you have it."

Only moments after Peace dies, King Oruc sends an assassin after Patience. She easily dispatches him and leaves the castle, stopping to visit her father's preserved head in Slaves' Hall, where the heads of the wisest people are kept alive by headworms. Since the heads are coerced to speak only the truth, Patience forces her father to divulge his darkest secrets. Peace reveals that since Patience's birth, he had been fighting a powerful compulsion to bring her to Cranning, home of the geblings. The "Cranning Call," as it was known, drew the world's greatest thinkers and achievers to make a pilgrimage to Cranning, never to be seen or heard from again. Peace says the source of the Call is the Unwyrm, attempting to summon Patience to his lair.

Outside the castle, Patience feels the Cranning Call and decides she will go to Cranning to challenge the Unwyrm. Even as the Cranning Call becomes stronger and more urgent, she chooses her own routes towards the city in defiance of the Unwyrm's power. Patience, joined by Angel and a massive river woman named Sken, eventually meets Ruin and Reck, twin brother and sister geblings who are together the king of the geblings. All their lives, Ruin and Reck had been repelled from Cranning by the Unwyrm, but the Cranning Call surrounding Patience cancels the repulsion and allows them to travel with her. Will, the silent but strong human who had lived as Reck's slave, joins their party.

They stop by a house advertising simply ANSWERS. The owner, a dwelf named Heffiji, gives them a crash course in the strange genetics of Imakulata, in which every native plant or animal derives from a single originating species: a black segmented insect, or wyrm. Heffiji also explains that the scepter Patience had retrieved from her father's shoulder was the mindstone of the gebling king, stolen 300 generations ago by the Heptarch. Surgically implanted in the brain, it transfers the memories of the previous owners to the current host while absorbing new memories. Ruin – a skilled surgeon - agrees to insert the crystal into Patience's brain.

Patience spends the next 40 days half-crazy, processing the memories of previous Heptarchs and the alien minds of gebling kings. She relives the moment when the Starship Captain, lured through lust to the surface, mates with the Wyrm in its lair beneath a glacier that would later become Cranwater. The Wyrm gave birth to the geblings, dwelfs and gaunts – and then finally to a giant wyrm-like child called Unwyrm. Finally, Patience understands the Cranning Call is summoning her to mate with the Unwyrm, so that he can impregnate her with Kristos, spawning a superior human race. This improved species would outcompete humans as well as the dwelf, gebling, and gaunt variants produced by the first-generation mating between the Wyrm and the Starship Captain, eventually becoming the dominant form of life on Imakulata.

Even as her lust for Unwyrm grows, Patience knows she must kill him or the world will be doomed. She explains it all to the rest of her companions, and they continue their journey to meet and hopefully kill Unwyrm before he is able to bring his dark plans to fruition. When it is all over Patience hopes to take her place as Heptarch and unite all of the planet's species together in peace. Following several twists and turns, the group finally reach their final destination and confront Unwyrm in his ice cave. Patience and her companions then come to terms with all that has happened and set about making the world a fairer place for all the species of Imakulata.

== The fictional world of Wyrms ==
Wyrms is set on Imakulata, a far-future planet that was colonized by humans thousands of years before the book begins. Ore for producing hard metal is extremely rare on Imakulata, most of the deposits having been destroyed by the Starship Captain – the first human to set foot on the new world – while his ship was still in orbit.

The genetic code of species on Imakulata is malleable, displaying dramatic evolutionary changes in only a few generations. As one character notes, "every creature's genetic molecule, which is the mirror of the will, obeys the slightest command to change."

== Species ==
=== Geblings ===
Called "goblins" by humans, the geblings are an intelligent species who have the ability to communicate with each other telepathically and near-perfect powers of recollection. Physically, they resemble furry, stunted humans with long, forked, mobile tongues. They are always born as twins. Geblings' brains contain a crystal globe called the mindstone, which stores important memories and thoughts. Children eat their dead parent's mindstones, so that they can absorb their ancestors' most cherished memories.

=== Dwelfs ===
Smaller than the geblings, with half-size heads and tiny brains, dwelfs have an extremely poor short-term memory and the mental capacity of a human child.

=== Gaunts ===
Gaunts resemble lithe, beautiful humans. They have no will of their own. They respond telepathically to the desires of those around them and attempt to satisfy whatever desire is strongest. For that reason they are often employed as prostitutes.

As one gaunt explains it, "[Our will] dries up like old cake and crumbles away whenever a human or a gebling or even, disgusting as it is, a dwelf desires something of us."

== See also ==
- Wyrms (comics)
- Orson Scott Card bibliography
