= Solomon Benedict de Worms =

Austrian aristocrat & businessman (1801–1882)

- Born: 5 February 1801
- Died: 20 October 1882 (aged 81)
- Occupations: Plantation owner Stockbroker
- Spouse: Henrietta Samuel
- Children: George de Worms, 2nd Baron de Worms; Anthony Mayer de Worms; Ellen Henrietta de Worms; Henry de Worms, 1st Baron Pirbright
- Parent(s): Benedikt Moses Worms and Schönche Jeannette Rothschild
- Relatives: Mayer Amschel Rothschild (maternal grandfather)

Baron Solomon Benedict de Worms (5 February 1801 – 20 October 1882) was an Austrian aristocrat, plantation owner in Ceylon, and stockbroker in London.

== Biography ==
=== Early life ===
Solomon Benedict de Worms was born on 5 February 1801 in Frankfurt. His father was Benedikt Moses Worms (1769–1824) and his mother, Schönche Jeannette Rothschild (1771–1859). He had two brothers, Maurice Benedict de Worms (1805–1867) and Gabriel Benedict de Worms (1802–1881), and one sister, Henriette Worms (1803–1879).

His maternal grandfather was Mayer Amschel Rothschild (1744–1812), the founder of the Rothschild banking dynasty. As a result, his maternal uncles were Amschel Mayer Rothschild (1773–1855), Salomon Mayer von Rothschild (1774–1855), Nathan Mayer Rothschild (1777–1836), Carl Mayer von Rothschild (1788–1855), James Mayer de Rothschild (1792–1868), and his maternal aunts, Isabella Rothschild (1781–1861), Babette Rothschild (1784–1869), Julie Rothschild (1790–1815) and Henriette Rothschild (1791–1866).

=== Career ===
After spending some time in London, he went to Ceylon to build one of the largest plantations there with his brothers, Maurice and Gabriel. In 1865, he returned to London and worked as a stockbroker.

On 23 April 1871, Franz Joseph I of Austria (1830–1916) made him 1st Baron de Worms [Austria]. Three years later, on 10 August 1874, Queen Victoria (1819–1901) allowed him to use his Austrian title in Great Britain.

He was a life member of the Council of the United Synagogue and a warden of the Great Synagogue of London.

=== Personal life ===
He married Henrietta Samuel, daughter of Samuel Moses Samuel, on 11 July 1827. They had four children:

- George de Worms, 2nd Baron de Worms (1829–1902).
- Anthony Mayer de Worms (1830–1864).
- Ellen Henrietta de Worms (1836-1894).
- Henry de Worms, 1st Baron Pirbright (1840–1903).

He died on 20 October 1882.
