= Wurm (surname) =

Wurm (=Worm) is a German-language surname.

- Armin Wurm (born 1989), German professional hockey player
- Erwin Wurm (born 1954), Austrian artist
- Frank Wurm (1924–1993), American baseball player
- Frederick Wurm, full name Louis Friedrich Wurm, (1832–1910), early colonist of South Australia
- Grete Wurm (1919-2002), German actress
- Harald Wurm (born 1984), Austrian cross country skier
- Jan Wurm, American painter
- Johann Friedrich Wurm, (1760–1833), German astronomer
- John Nicholas Wurm (1927–1984), American Roman Catholic bishop
- Mary Wurm (1860–1938), English pianist and composer
- Mathilde Wurm (1874–1935), German politician
- Ole Wurm (or Worm) (1588–1655), Danish physician and antiquary
- Stephen Wurm (1922–2001), Hungarian-born Australian linguist
- Theophil Wurm (1868–1953), German Lutheran bishop
- Wenzel von Wurm (1859-1921), Austro-Hungarian Army general
