= Parasitic worm (disambiguation) =

Parasitic worm, also known as helminth, is large macroparasite.

Parasitic worm may also refer to:

- Acanthocephala, or the spiny-headed worms all of which are parasitic.
- Hirudinea, ectoparasitic annelids commonly known as leeches
- Nematoda, or roundworms the most well known of which are parasitic
  - Enterobius, commonly known as pinworms, cause the disease enterobiasis.
  - Hookworms, intestinal parasites of mammals.
- Pentastomida, sometimes referred to as tongue worms which are obligate parasites
- Platyhelminthes, or flatworms the phyla which contains the parasitic tapeworms and flukes.
  - Liver fluke
  - Blood fluke
  - Lung fluke
  - Intestinal fluke

== Parasitic worm infection ==
- Tapeworm infection
- Deworming
- Effects of parasitic worms on the immune system
- Coenurosis, intermediate infection of host
  - Coenurosis in humans
- Enterobiasis, pinworm infection
- Echinococcosis, host disease by tapeworm larve
- Helminthiasis, disease caused by any parasitic worm

== See also ==
- Nematomorpha, the horsehair worms are parasitoids not truly parasites.
- Parasitology, relation between host and parasite
- Human parasites
- Parasitic nutrition, parasite nutrition by feeding off the host
- Ringworm, a fungal infection which causes a ring shaped discoloration in the skin
