= Wurmser =

Wurmser is a surname. Notable people with the surname include:

- Alfred G Wurmser (1912–1984), artist, animator and Fellow of the Royal Television Society
- Meyrav Wurmser, Israeli scholar
- David Wurmser, advisor to Dick Cheney
- Juan Mauricio Wurmser, Minister of Economy and Commerce, Guatemala from 1996-98
- Léon Wurmser (1931–2020), Swiss psychoanalyst
- Leo Wurmser (1905–1967). Austrian musician, active in Britain from 1938
- Dagobert Sigmund von Wurmser (1724–1797), Austrian general during the Napoleonic Wars
- Nicholas Wurmser, medieval painter from Strasbourg
