= Nathan Mayer Rothschild =

German-born British financier (1777–1836)

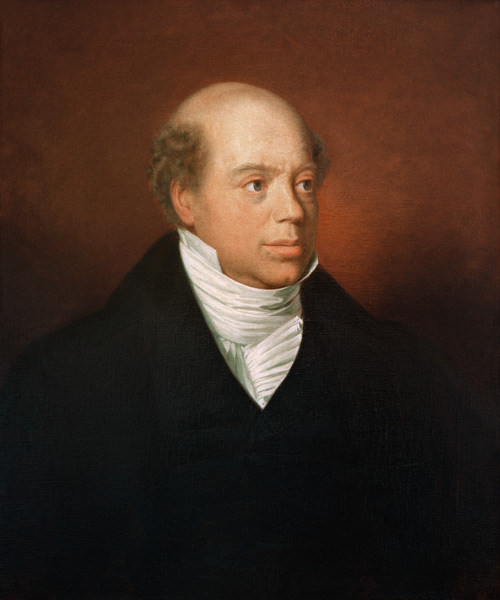
- 1853 portrait
- Born: 16 September 1777; Frankfurt, Holy Roman Empire
- Died: 28 July 1836 (aged 58); Frankfurt, German Confederation
- Known for: Rothschild banking family of England
- Spouse: Hannah Barent-Cohen (m. 1806)
- Children: Charlotte Rothschild; Lionel de Rothschild; Sir Anthony de Rothschild, 1st Baronet; Nathaniel de Rothschild; Hannah Mayer Rothschild; Mayer Amschel de Rothschild; Louise Rothschild
- Parent(s): Mayer Amschel Rothschild; Guttle Schnapper

Nathan Mayer Rothschild (16 September 1777 – 28 July 1836), also known as Baron Nathan Mayer Rothschild, was a British-German banker, businessman and financier. Born in Frankfurt am Main, he was the third of the five sons of Mayer Amschel Rothschild and his wife, Guttle (née Schnapper). He was the founder of the British branch of the prominent Rothschild family.

== Early life, origins in Frankfurt ==
Nathan Mayer Rothschild was born on 16 September 1777 to Mayer Amschel Rothschild and Guttle Schnapper in the Jewish ghetto area of Frankfurt in the Holy Roman Empire (in present-day Germany). He was born to an Ashkenazi Jewish family. He was the third son, and his brothers were Amschel Mayer Rothschild, Salomon Mayer Rothschild, Carl Mayer Rothschild and James Mayer Rothschild. All five brothers would go on to become close business partners spread out across Europe. They had five sisters, including Henriette Rothschild, who married Abraham Montefiore.

== Move to England and involvement in textile trade ==
In 1798, at the age of 21, he settled in Manchester, England, and established a business in textile trading and finance. He later moved to London and began dealing on the London Stock Exchange from 1804. He made a fortune in trading bills of exchange through a banking enterprise begun in 1805, dealing with financial instruments such as foreign bills and government securities.

Rothschild became a freemason of the Emulation Lodge, No. 21, of the Premier Grand Lodge of England on 24 October 1802, in London. Until this point, the few Ashkenazi Jews who lived in England tended to belong to the "Antients" on account of their generally lower social class, while the more established Sephardim joined the Moderns.

== Gold, securities trading and the Napoleonic Wars ==
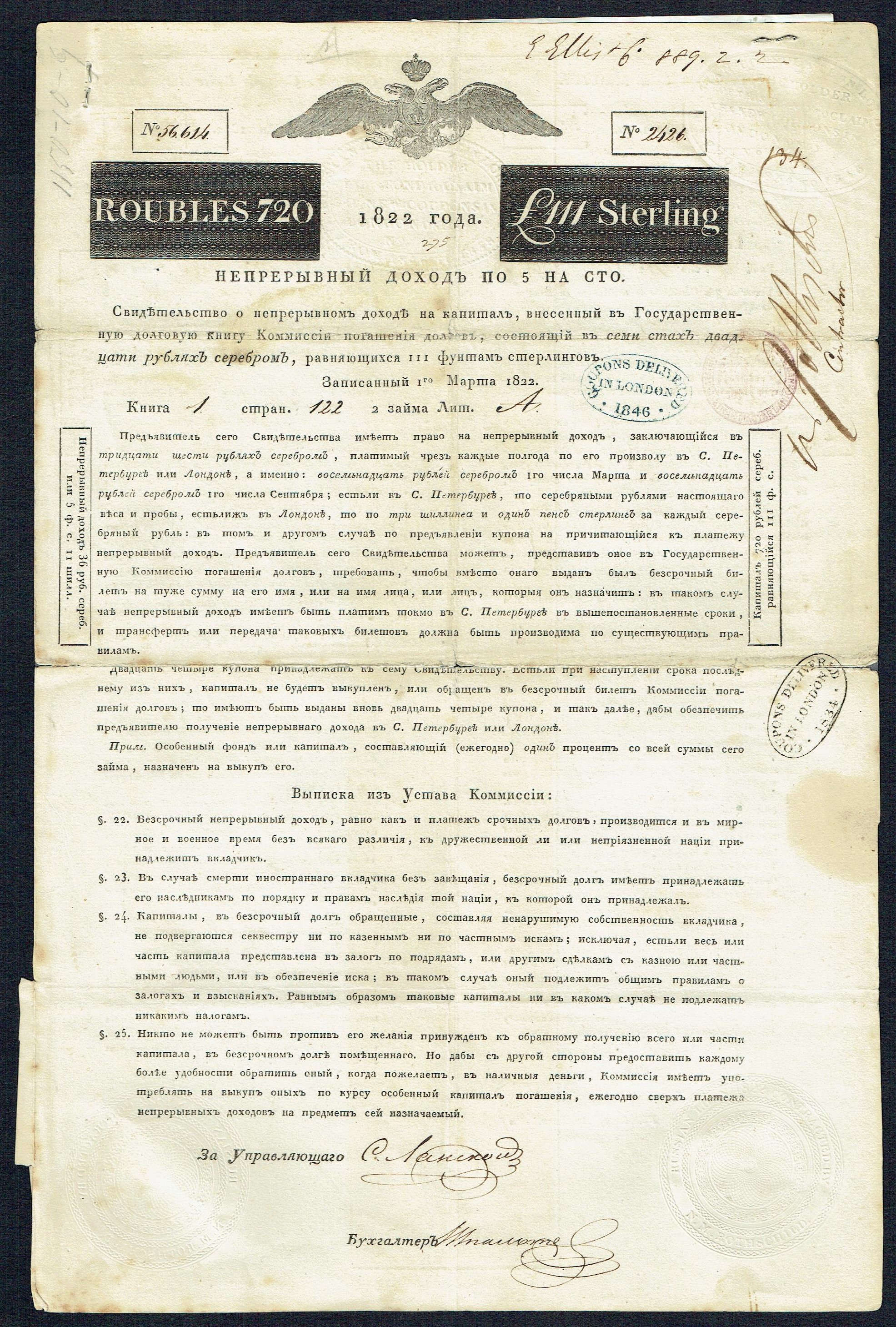
Bond of the Russian Government, issued 1 March 1822, signed by Nathan Mayer Rothschild

From 1809, Rothschild began to deal in gold bullion and developed this as a cornerstone of his business, which was to become N. M. Rothschild & Sons. From 1811 on, in negotiation with Commissary-General John Charles Herries, he undertook to transfer money to pay Wellington's troops, on campaign in Portugal and Spain against Napoleon, and later to make subsidy payments to British allies when these organized new troops after Napoleon's disastrous Russian campaign.

Later, during the 1840s, as early socialists in France (such as Alphonse Toussenel and Pierre Leroux) attacked the Rothschilds and "Jewish financiers" in general, a French socialist from among their circle, Georges Marie Mathieu-Dairnvaell using the penname "Satan", authored a work entitled Histoire édifiante et curieuse de Rothschild I^{er}, Roi des Juifs ("Edifying and Curious History of Rothschild the First, King of the Jews"). Within it, he made claims about Nathan Mayer Rothschild's early knowledge of the outcome of the Battle of Waterloo, whose couriers delivered information about the victory back to London before the British Cabinet itself knew, claiming that he used this knowledge to speculate on the London Stock Exchange and make a vast fortune by unfair advantage against the other British stock holders, essentially defrauding them.

Frederic Morton relates the story thus:

To the Rothschilds, [England's] chief financial agents, Waterloo brought a many million pound scoop. ... a Rothschild agent ... jumped into a boat at Ostend ... Nathan Rothschild ... let his eye fly over the lead paragraphs. A moment later he was on his way to London (beating Wellington's envoy by many hours) to tell the government that Napoleon had been crushed: but his news was not believed, because the government had just heard of the English defeat at Quatre Bras. Then he proceeded to the Stock Exchange. Another man in his position would have sunk his work into consols [bank annuities], already weak because of Quatre Bras. But this was Nathan Rothschild. He leaned against "his" pillar. He did not invest. He sold. He dumped consols. ... Consols dropped still more. "Rothschild knows," the whisper rippled through the 'Change. "Waterloo is lost." Nathan kept on selling, ... consols plummeted – until, a split second before it was too late, Nathan suddenly bought a giant parcel for a song. Moments afterwards the great news broke, to send consols soaring. We cannot guess the number of hopes and savings wiped out by this engineered panic.

The Rothschild family and others have claimed that this embellished version of events originated in Mathieu-Dairnvaell's 1846 writing, was further embellished by John Reeves in 1887 in The Rothschilds: the Financial Rulers of Nations, and then repeated in other popular accounts like that of Morton and the 1934 American film directed by Alfred L. Werker, The House of Rothschild.

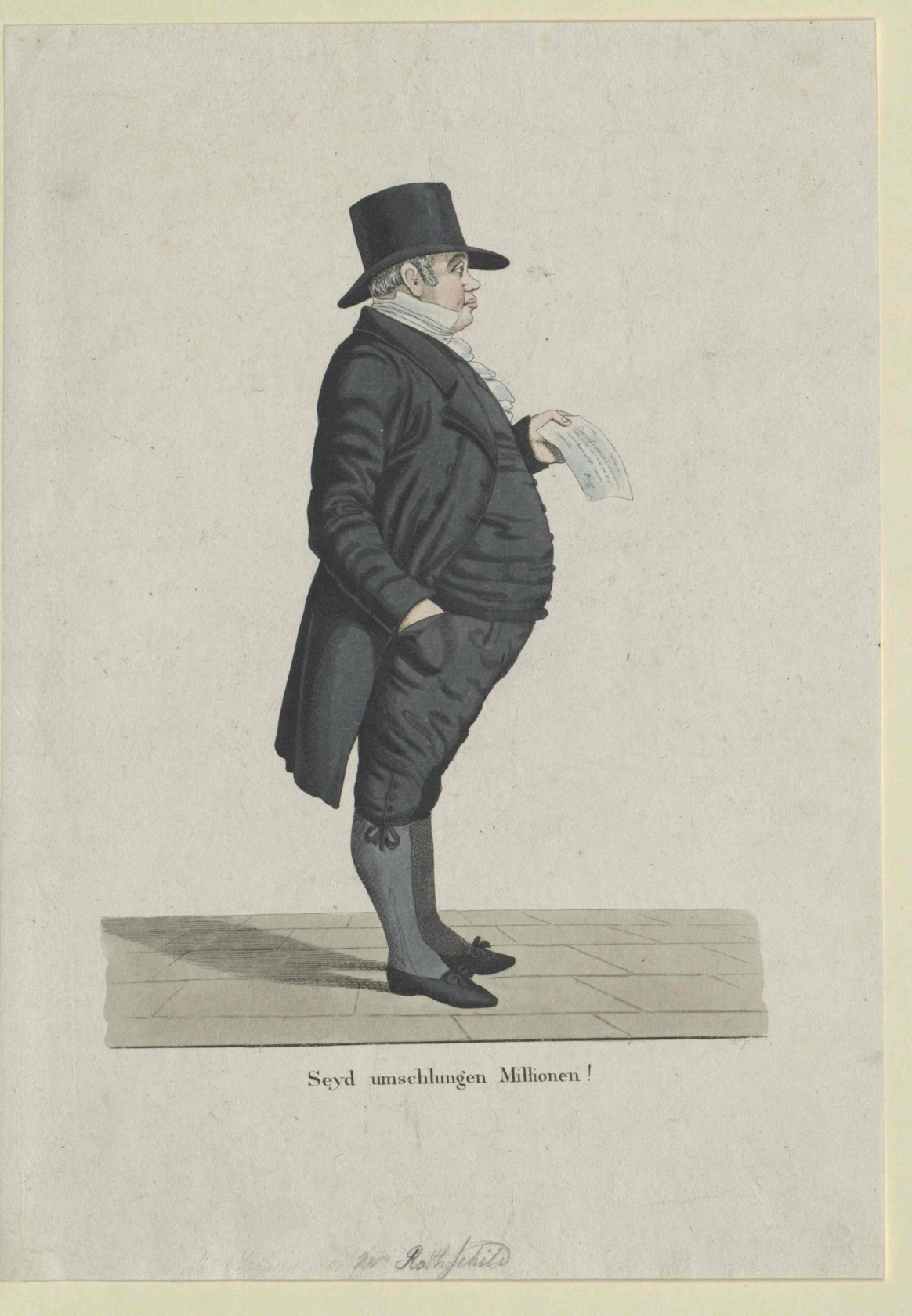
Portrait of British banker Nathan Meyer Rothschild, 1817

Historian Niall Ferguson agrees that the Rothschilds' couriers did get to London first and alerted the family to Napoleon's defeat, but argues that since the family had been banking on a protracted military campaign, the losses arising from the disruption to their business more than offset any short-term gains in bonds after Waterloo. Rothschild capital did soar, but over a much longer period: Nathan's breakthrough had been prior to Waterloo when he negotiated a deal to supply cash to Wellington's army. The family made huge profits over a number of years from this governmental financing by adopting a high-risk strategy involving exchange-rate transactions, bond-price speculations, and commissions.

It is also very commonly reported that the Rothschilds' advanced information was caused by the speed of prized racing pigeons, held by the family. However, this is widely disputed and the Rothschild archive states that, although pigeon post "was one of the tools of success in the Rothschild business strategy during the period c. 1820–1850,... it is likely that a series of couriers on horseback brought the news" of Waterloo to Rothschild.

More recently, Brian Cathcart has refuted the claim that Rothschild was the first man in London to know of the victory at Waterloo. He traces the earliest news to a dispatch Wellington sent via his messenger to Lord Bathurst, the Secretary of War, which was received on the evening of 21 June.

== Family ascent to prominence ==
Master of unbounded wealth, he boasts that he is the arbiter of peace and war, and that the credit of nations depends upon his nod; his correspondents are innumerable; his courtiers outrun those of sovereign princes, and absolute sovereigns; ministers of state are in his pay. Paramount in the cabinets of continental Europe, he aspires to the domination of our own.

— Thomas Slingsby Duncombe, Radical MP, British House of Commons, 1828.

In 1816, his four brothers were raised to the nobility (Adelung) by the Emperor of Austria. They were now permitted to prefix the Rothschild name with the particle von, although outside the German-speaking world it was common practice across Europe to use the language of diplomacy, rendering names and titles in French, in this case: de.

In 1818, he arranged a £5 million loan to the Prussian government and the issuing of bonds for government loans formed a mainstay of his bank's business. He gained a position of such power in the City of London that by 1825–1826 he was able to supply enough coin to the Bank of England to enable it to avert a liquidity crisis.

=== Title ===
In 1822, all five brothers were granted the title of Baron, or raised to the Freiherrnstand, by the Emperor. From 1822, both Nathan Mayer himself, and any legitimate male descendant, could call himself: Freiherr von Rothschild, or in the language of diplomacy whether in France or not, Baron de Rothschild. In practice, having accepted the aristocratic title for the benefit of his family, he chose not to use it himself and so did not request official recognition of the title. In 1838, two years after his death, Queen Victoria did authorise the use of this Austrian title in the United Kingdom.

In 1824, together with his brother-in-law, Sir Moses Montefiore, he founded the Alliance Assurance Company, which later merged with Sun Insurance to form Sun Alliance.

== Slavery ==
In the aftermath of the Slavery Abolition Act 1833 with the Slave Compensation Act 1837, Rothschild and his business partner Moses Montefiore loaned the British Government £15 million (worth £1.54 billion in 2025) with interest which was subsequently paid off by the British taxpayers. This money was used to compensate the slave owners in the British Empire after slavery had been abolished. According to the Legacies of British Slave-Ownership at the University College London, Rothschild himself was a successful claimant under the scheme being a beneficiary as mortgage holder to a plantation in the colony of Antigua (present day Antigua and Barbuda) which included 158 enslaved Black people. He received a £2,571 compensation payment, at the time (worth £264,592 in 2025)

== Later dealings and death ==
In 1835, he secured a contract with the Spanish Government giving him the rights to the Almadén mines in southern Spain, effectively gaining a European mercury monopoly. In June 1836 he traveled to Frankfurt to attend his son Lionel's wedding, but became too ill to return home and died in Frankfurt at the age of 58 on 28 July as a result of an infected abscess.

His body was brought to London for burial, with the funeral procession on 8 August from his house on New Court in the City of London to the Brady Street Ashkenazi Cemetery in Whitechapel accompanied by three police Superintendents (those of the London City Police and of H and K Divisions of the new Metropolitan Police), William Taylor Copeland (Lord Mayor of London) and contingents from the Jews' Orphan Asylum and the Jews' Free School, and the graveside address given by Chief Rabbi Solomon Hirschell. Nathan's wife Hannah was later buried alongside him.

== Legacy ==
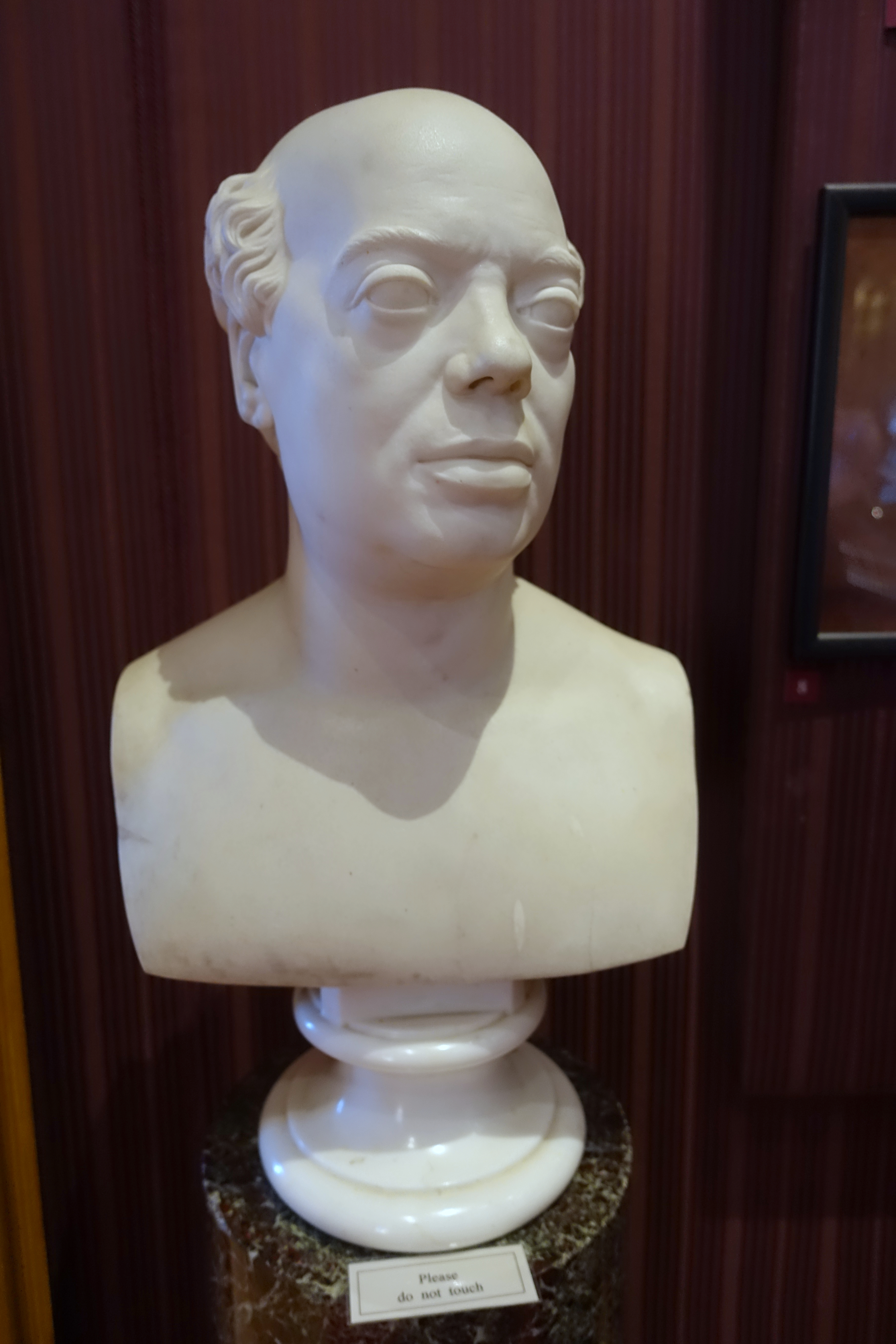
Nathan Mayer de Rothschild, sculptor unknown, early 1800s - Waddesdon Manor - Buckinghamshire, England

By the time of his death, his personal net worth amounted to 0.62% of British national income. He had also secured the position of the Rothschilds as the preeminent investment bankers in Britain and Europe. His son, Lionel Nathan Rothschild, continued the family business in England. During his life, Nathan Mayer Rothschild, as the most accomplished of his brothers, solidified the Rothschild family as a major power in European and thus world affairs. Their great rivals, the Baring family, said of Nathan Mayer and his family; "They are generally well planned, with great cleverness and adroitness in execution -- but he is in money and funds what Bonaparte was in war."

The German poet Heinrich Heine, a Jewish convert to Lutheranism, declared "money is the God of our time and Rothschild is his prophet", he described Nathan Mayer Rothschild as one of "three terroristic names that spell the gradual annihilation of the old aristocracy", alongside Cardinal Richelieu and Maximilien Robespierre. For Heine, Richelieu had destroyed the power of the old feudal aristocracy, Robespierre had "decapitated" its weakened remnant and now Rothschild signified the creation of a new social elite, as new lords of finance. The financial system which the Rothschilds created during this period was viewed as a revolutionary development, with a cosmopolitan emphasis, due to the high liquidity of assets in the new system based in bonds, instead of being based in land.

== Personal life ==
On 22 October 1806 in London, he married Hannah Barent-Cohen, daughter of Levy Barent Cohen and wife Lydia Diamantschleifer. Hannah Barent-Cohen was the aunt of Benjamin Frederik David Philips, the founder of Philips, and Karl Heinrich Marx. Hannah's sister, Judith Barent-Cohen, was the wife of Sir Moses Montefiore. Nathan and Hannah's children were:

1. Charlotte Rothschild (1807–1859) married 1826 Anselm von Rothschild (1803–1874) Vienna.
2. Lionel Nathan (1808–1879) married 1836 Charlotte von Rothschild (1819–1884) Naples
3. Anthony Nathan (1810–1876) married 1840 Louise Montefiore (1821–1910)
4. Nathaniel (1812–1870) married 1842 Charlotte de Rothschild (1825–1899) Paris
5. Hannah Mayer (1815–1864) married 1839 Hon. Henry FitzRoy (1807–1859)
6. Mayer Amschel (1818–1874) married 1850 Juliana Cohen (1831–1877)
7. Louise von Rothschild (1820–1894) married 1842 to her first cousin Mayer Carl von Rothschild (1820–1886) Frankfurt

== Description ==
Elizabeth Longford describes Nathan Mayer Rothschild as "a financier with prominent blue eyes, light reddish curls and an astute humorous expression."

An anonymous contemporary described Nathan Rothschild at the London Stock Exchange as "he leaned against the 'Rothschild Pillar' ... hung his heavy hands into his pockets, and began to release silent, motionless, implacable cunning":

Eyes are usually called the windows of the soul. But in Rothschild's case you would conclude that the windows are false ones, or that there was no soul to look out of them. There comes not one pencil of light from the interior, neither is there one gleam of that which comes from without reflected in any direction. The whole puts you in mind of an empty skin, and you wonder why it stands upright without at least something in it. By and by another figure comes up to it. It then steps two paces aside, and the most inquisitive glance that you ever saw, and more inquisitive than you would ever have thought of, is drawn out of those fixed and leaden eyes, as if one were drawing a sword from a scabbard. The visiting figure, which has the appearance of coming by accident and not by design, stops just a second or two, in the course of which looks are exchanged which, though you cannot translate, you feel must be of most important meaning. After this, the eyes are sheathed up again, and the figure resumes its stony posture. During the morning, numbers of visitors come, all of whom meet with a similar reception and vanish in a similar manner. Last of all the figure itself vanishes, leaving you utterly at a loss.

== See also ==
- History of the Jews in England
- Rothschild banking family of England
