= Carl Mayer von Rothschild =

German-born banker

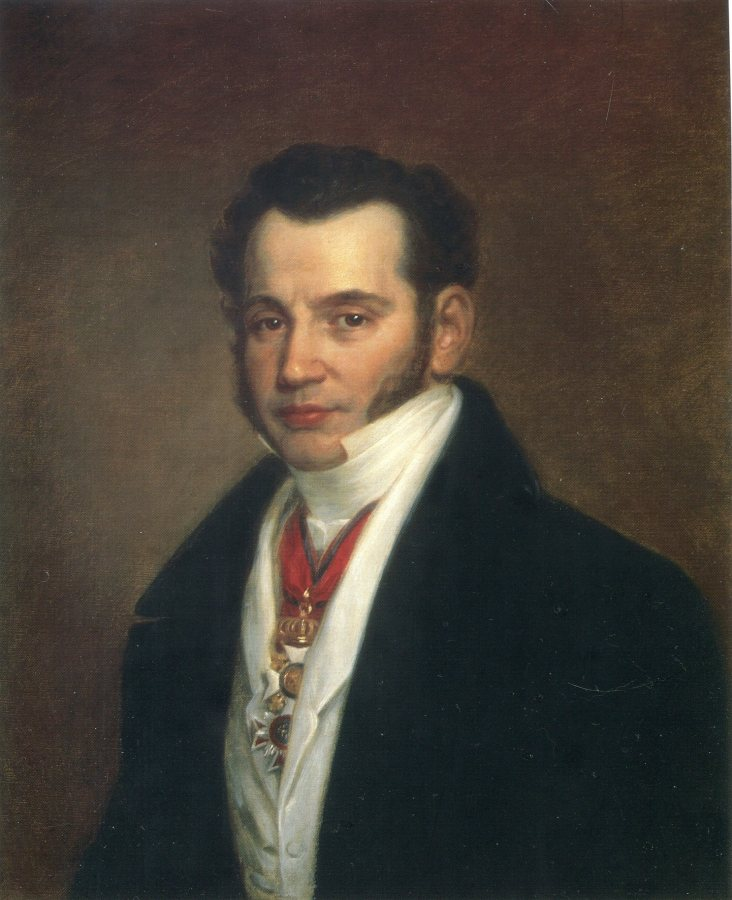
- Born: Kalman Mayer Rothschild; 24 April 1788; Frankfurt, Holy Roman Empire
- Died: 10 March 1855 (aged 66); Naples, Kingdom of the Two Sicilies
- Occupation: Banker
- Title: Freiherr
- Spouse: Adelheid Herz (m. 1818; died 1853)
- Children: 1) Charlotte, 2) Mayer Carl, 3) Adolphe Carl, 4) Wilhelm Carl, 5) Anselm Alexander Carl
- Parent(s): Mayer Amschel Rothschild; Gutlé Schnapper

Carl Mayer Freiherr von Rothschild (24 April 1788 – 10 March 1855) was a Frankfurt-born banker in the Kingdom of the Two Sicilies and the founder of the Neopolitan branch of the prominent Rothschild family.

== Life and career ==
Born as Kalman Mayer Rothschild in Frankfurt am Main, he was the fourth of the five sons of Mayer Amschel Rothschild (1743–1812) and his wife, Gutlé Schnapper (1753–1849). He would become known as "Carl" by the family except for his English relatives, who translated it as "Charles".

Raised in an increasingly prosperous family, he was trained in his father's banking business and lived at home until age twenty-nine, when he acquired a modest residence at 33 Neue Mainzer Strasse in Frankfurt in preparation for his marriage on 16 September 1818 to Adelheid Herz (1800–1853). They would have the following children:

- Charlotte (1819–1884), who married Lionel de Rothschild
- Mayer Carl (1820–1886)
- Adolph Carl (1823–1900)
- Wilhelm Carl (1828–1901)
- Anselm Alexander Carl (1835–1854)

Wanting to expand the family business across Europe, the eldest Rothschild son (Amschel) remained in Frankfurt, while the other sons were sent to different European cities to establish banking branches. The 1821 occupation of Naples by the Austrian army provided the opportunity for the Rothschilds to set up business in the Kingdom. Carl Rothschild was therefore sent to Naples, where he established C M de Rothschild & Figli to operate as a satellite office of the Rothschild banking family's headquarters in Frankfurt.

Carl Rothschild has sometimes been seen as the least gifted of the five brothers. However, he proved himself in Naples as a strong financial manager and someone very capable at developing all-important business connections. He established a good working relationship with Luigi de' Medici, the "Direttore della Segreteria di Azienda del Regno di Napoli" (Finance Minister), and his operation became the dominant banking house in Naples. As a result of Carl's success, the Rothschilds had a substantial banking presence in England and three other major European capitals, giving the family considerable influence and an advantage over their competitors.

Carl Mayer gained a significant influence with the Bourbon king in Naples. Clients of the Naples bank also included the Vatican, the dukes of Parma and the dukes of Tuscany.

In 1822, Carl Rothschild and his four brothers were each granted the title of baron, or Freiherr, by Kaiser Franz I of Austria. During the winter of 1826, Leopold of Saxe-Coburg, future King of the Belgians, was a guest of Carl Freiherr von Rothschild at his villa in Naples.

In 1829, Carl was appointed consul-general of Sicily at Frankfurt and in January 1832 the Jewish banker was given a ribbon and star of the Sacred Military Constantinian Order of Saint George at a ceremony with the new Roman Catholic Pope, Gregory XVI. Reports that Rothschild was permitted to kiss the Pope's hand, rather than his foot, as was customary at the time, led to controversy in the Catholic world that the Pope was selling Rome out to "a Jew."

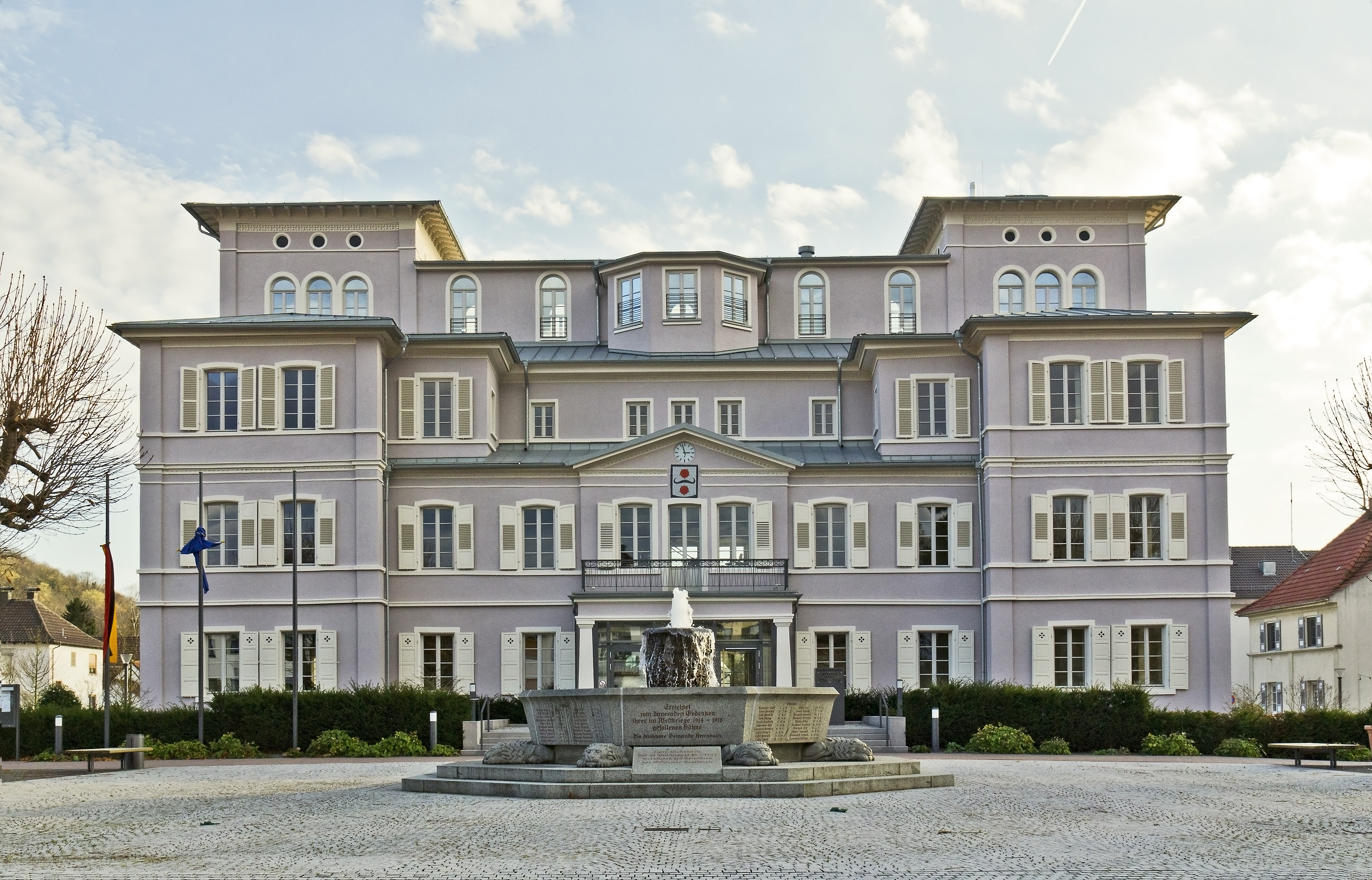
A former Rothschild residence in Hemsbach, Germany, a town where Rothschild became its first honorary citizen

Carl von Rothschild maintained homes in Frankfurt and in Naples. In 1837, he built the Villa Günthersburg on a large country property outside Frankfurt owned by his father, at what is now Günthersburg Park. In 1841, he bought the Villa Pignatelli at Riviera di Chiaia, with a spectacular view of the Sea and Vesuvio Volcano. The family lived there until 1860.

Two years after his wife Adelheid (née Hertz) died in 1853, and one year after their son Anselm Alexander Carl died at the age of eighteen, Carl Freiherr von Rothschild died in Naples, "sad and morose". One seventh of his estate went to his daughter Charlotte, with the rest divided equally between his three surviving sons. Adolf Carl took over the business in Naples from his father, while Mayer Carl and Wilhelm Carl succeeded their childless uncle Amschel in Frankfurt, even though Carl Mayer had wished his son Mayer Carl would succeed him in Naples. In 1861, the Rotschild bank closed in Naples, and the bank's assets were transferred to Frankfurt.

== In popular culture ==
In the 1934 movie The House of Rothschild, Carl Mayer von Rothschild is played by Noel Madison.

== Bibliography ==
- The Rothschilds; a Family Portrait by Frederic Morton. Atheneum Publishers (1962) ISBN 156836220X (1998 reprint)
- The Rothschilds, a Family of Fortune by Virginia Cowles. Alfred A. Knopf (1973) ISBN 0394487737
- Rothschild: The Wealth and Power of a Dynasty by Derek Wilson. Scribner, London (1988) ISBN 0684190184
- House of Rothschild : Money's Prophets: 1798–1848 by Niall Ferguson. Viking Press (1998) ISBN 0670857688
- The House of Rothschild (vol. 2) : The World's Banker: 1849–1999 by Niall Ferguson. Diane Publishing Co. (1999) ISBN 0756753937
