= Mayer Amschel Rothschild =

German banker (1744–1812)

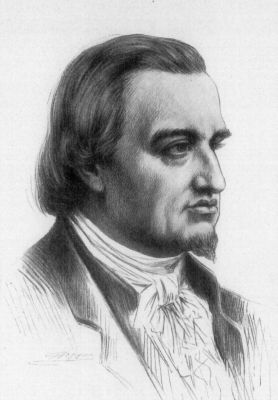
- Born: 23 February 1743 or 1744; Free City of Frankfurt, Holy Roman Empire
- Died: 19 September 1812 (aged 68); Frankfurt, Grand Duchy of Frankfurt, Confederation of the Rhine
- Occupation: Banker
- Known for: Rothschild banking dynasty
- Spouse: Guttle Schnapper (m. 1770)
- Children: 10, including Amschel, Salomon, Nathan, Carl and Jakob
- Father: Amschel Moses Rothschild

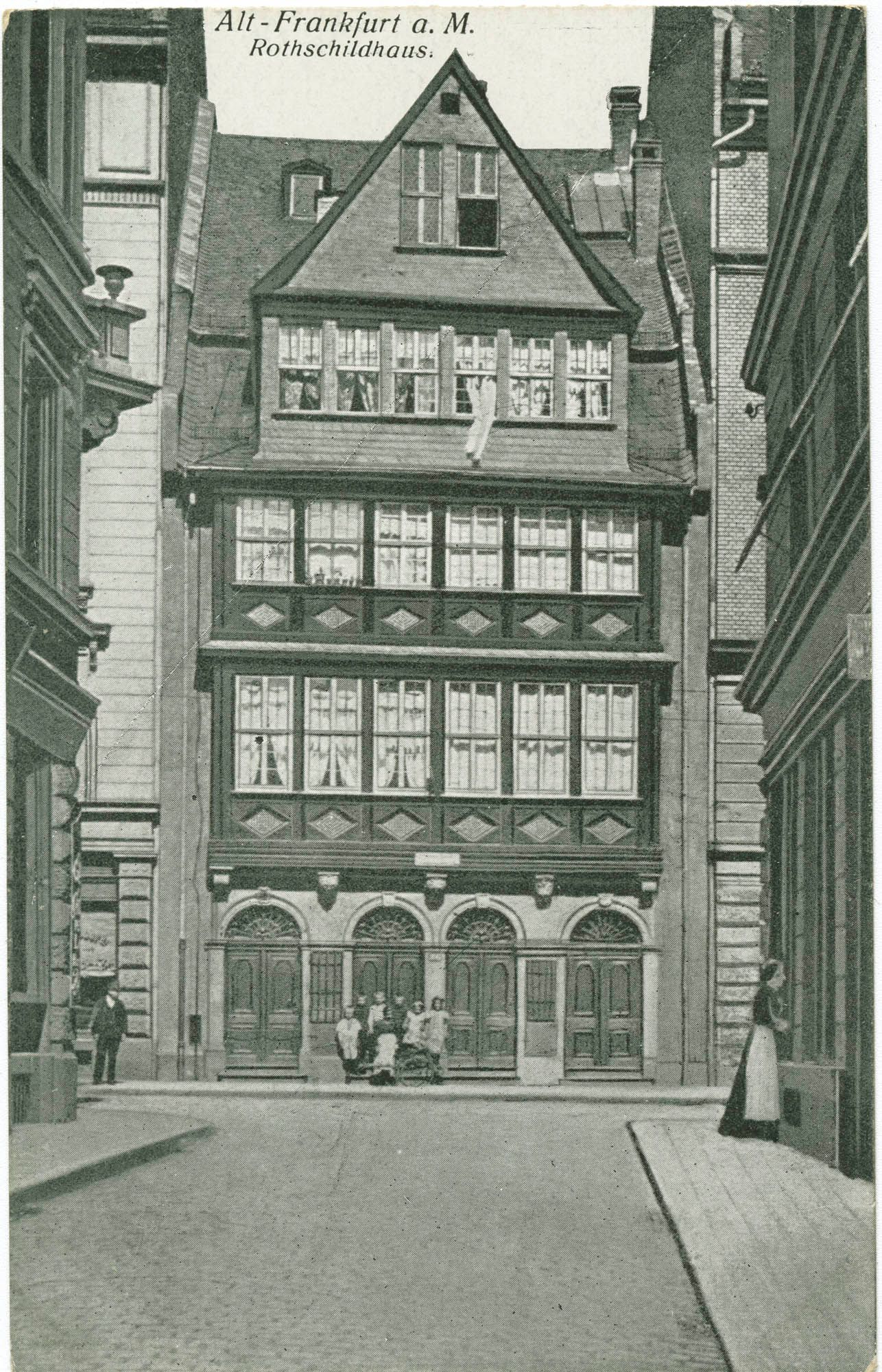
Rothschild family home in the Frankfurter Judengasse

Mayer Amschel Rothschild (23 February 1743 or 1744 – 19 September 1812; also spelled Anschel) was a German Jewish banker and the founder of the Rothschild banking dynasty, which dominated international finance in Europe between the 1820s and the 1870s. Referred to as a "founding father of international finance", Rothschild was ranked seventh on the Forbes magazine list of "The Twenty Most Influential Businessmen of All Time" in 2005.

== Early life ==
Mayer Amschel Rothschild was born in 1744 to an Ashkenazi Jewish family, in the Judengasse, the Jewish ghetto of Frankfurt, Holy Roman Empire (now Germany), one of eight children of Amschel Moses Rothschild (died 1755) and his wife, Schönche Rothschild (née Lechnich; died 1756).

The ancestry of the Rothschilds is originated back to 1569 to Izaak Elchanan Rothschild (Isaac (Isaak) Elchanan Bacharach, zum Hahn), whose name is derived from the German zum rothen Schild (with the old spelling "th"), meaning "with the red shield", in reference to the house where the family lived for many generations (At the time, houses were designated by signs with different symbols or colors, not numbers). His grandchildren and descendants took this name as the family name and kept it when they relocated in 1664 to another house in the Judengasse—Hinterpfann ("[house in] the back of the saucepan") — which became the family's home and place of business through to the early 19th century.

Amschel's father had a business in the trade of goods and currency exchange. He was a personal supplier of coins to the Prince of Hesse. The family home above the shop had a front wall 11 feet (3.4 m) wide, where more than 30 people lived at that time.

== Business career ==
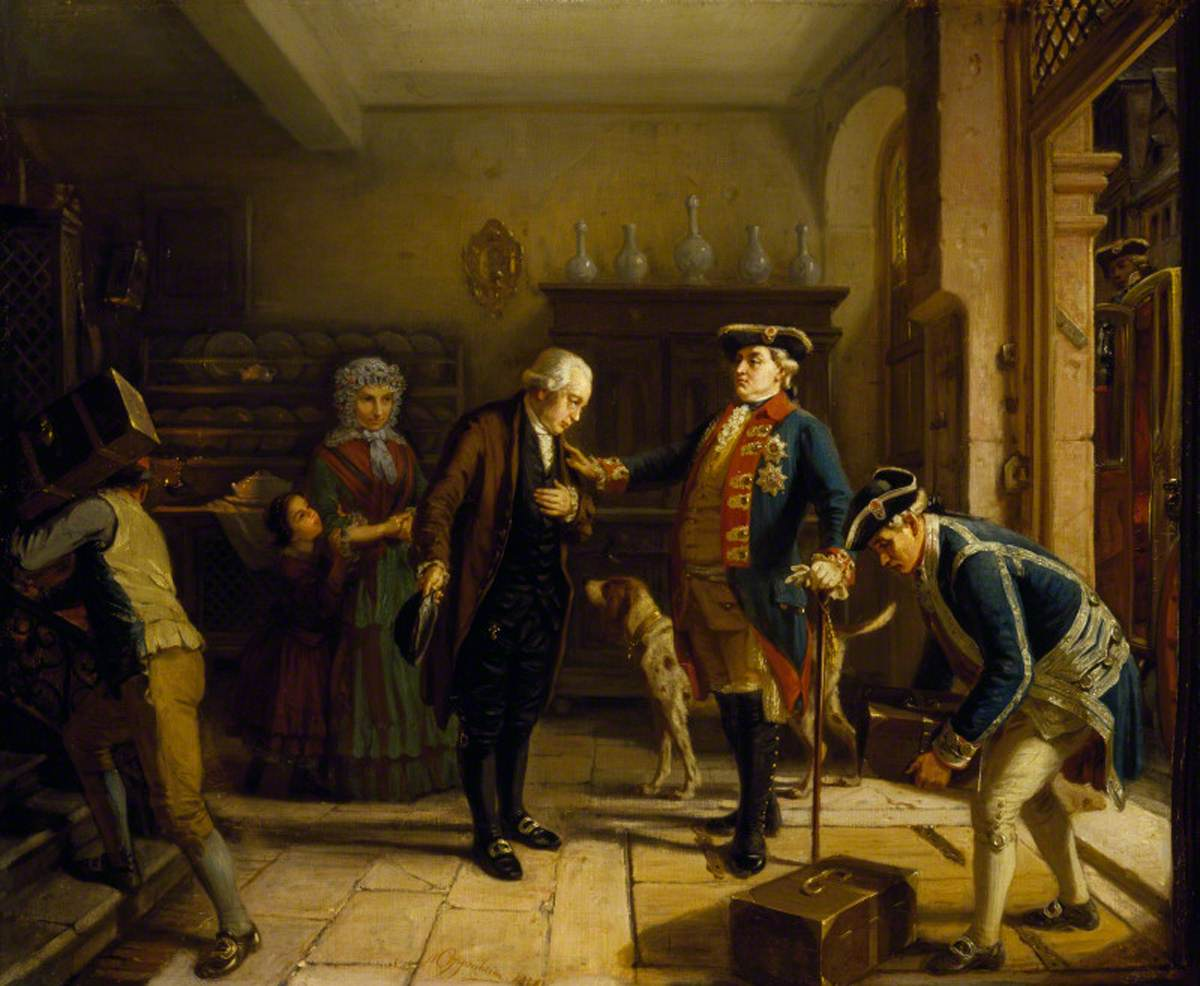
The Elector of Hesse entrusting Mayer Amschel Rothschild with his treasure

With the help of relatives, Rothschild secured an apprenticeship under Jacob Wolf Oppenheimer at the banking firm of Simon Wolf Oppenheimer in Hanover in 1757. The grandson of Samuel Oppenheimer taught Rothschild useful knowledge in foreign trade and currency exchange, before he returned to his brothers' business in Frankfurt in 1763.

He became a dealer in rare coins and won the patronage of Crown Prince Wilhelm of Hesse (who had also earlier patronised his father), gaining the title of "Court Factor" in 1769. Rothschild's coin business grew to include a number of princely patrons, and then expanded through the provision of banking services to Crown Prince Wilhelm, who became Wilhelm IX, Landgrave of Hesse-Kassel in 1785. Business expanded rapidly following the French Revolution when Rothschild handled payments from Britain for the hire of Hessian mercenaries.

By the early years of the 19th century, Rothschild had consolidated his position as principal international banker to Wilhelm IX and began to issue his own international loans, borrowing capital from the Landgrave.

In 1806, Napoleon invaded Germany in response to Wilhelm's support for Prussia. The Landgrave went into exile in the Duchy of Holstein, but Rothschild was able to continue as his banker, investing funds in London. He also profited from importing goods in circumvention of Napoleon's continental blockade.

== Rothschild dynasty ==
In 1798, third-born son Nathan Mayer Rothschild was sent to England to further the family interests in textile importing with £20,000 capital (equivalent of £2.2 million in 2025)—the first foreign branch. Nathan became a naturalized citizen in 1804 and established a bank in the City of London. In 1810, Mayer entered into a formal partnership agreement with his three eldest sons, thus founding M. A. Rothschild & Söhne.

In 1811, the Grand Duke of Frankfurt enacted a special law "decreeing that all Jews living in Frankfurt, together with their descendants, should enjoy civil rights and privileges equally with other citizens." In exchange for these newfound liberties the Jews had to pay him 440,000 florins, financed by Mayer Amschel Rothschild (at a substantial profit). A number of Masonic Jews at the time also petitioned the Grand Duke for the "exclusive right to maintain lodges in the city", which was granted.

The youngest son of Mayer Amschel, Jacob, was sent to Paris the same year, in 1811, enhancing the family's ability to operate across Europe. This enabled them to profit from the opportunity of financing Wellington's armies in Portugal, requiring the sourcing of large quantities of gold on behalf of the British government.

Rothschild died on 19 September 1812 in Frankfurt am Main. He was buried at the old Jewish cemetery in Frankfurt, located next to the Judengasse. His grave still exists. A park was named after him, and also a street (Rothschildallee). In 1817, he was posthumously ennobled by the emperor Francis I of Austria.

His descendants furthered the family fortune across Europe—the "five arrows" of banking. Eldest son Amschel Mayer took over the Frankfurt bank and Salomon moved to Vienna. Nathan turned the London branch into one of Europe's most powerful banking institutions (N. M. Rothschild & Sons), Calmann (gentrified to "Carl") set up a branch in Naples and Jacob ("James") opened de Rothschild Frères, becoming a giant of finance in Paris.

== Family ==
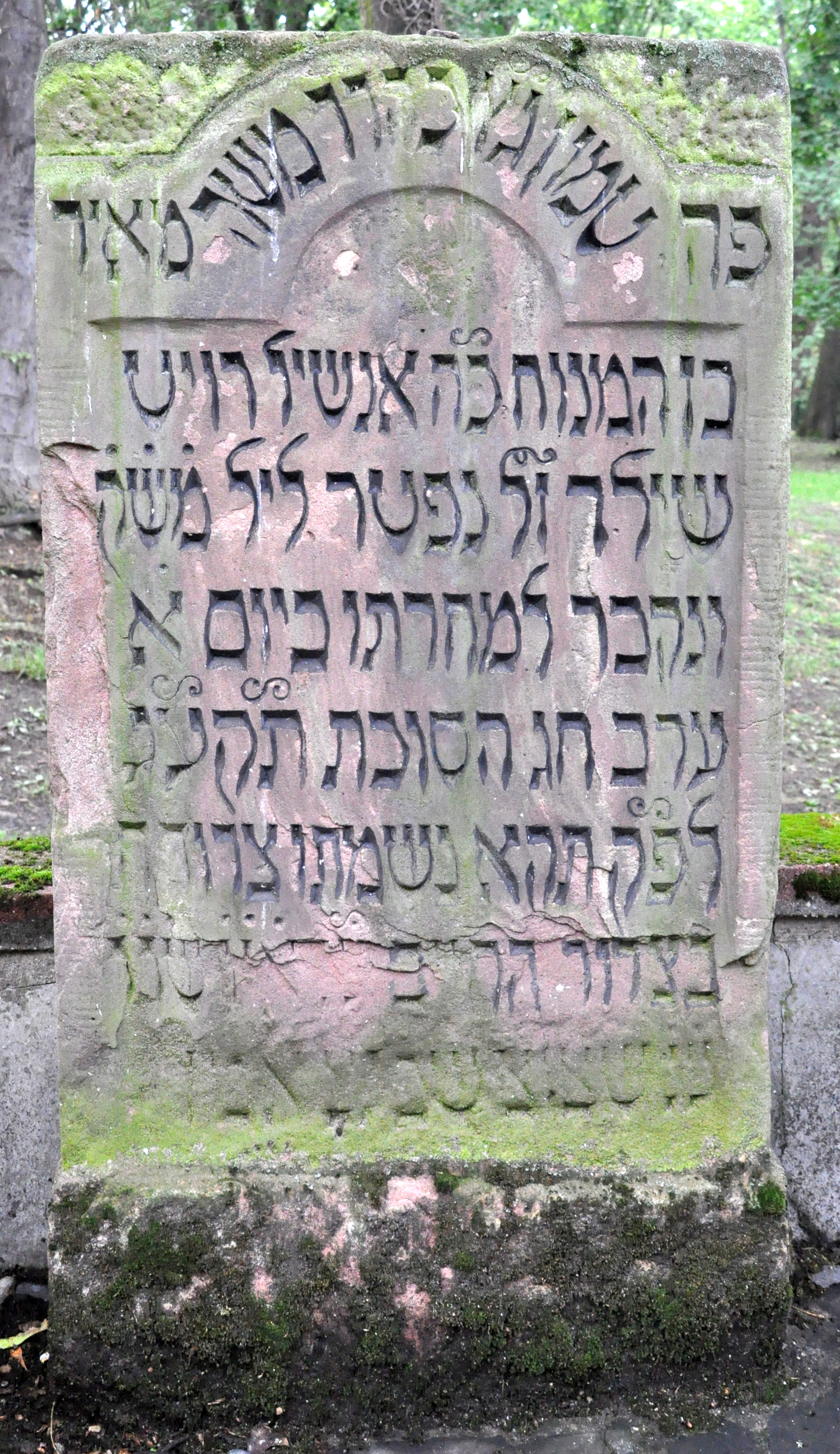
Grave stone of Mayer Amschel Rothschild in Frankfurt am Main. His name as it appears on the stone was Moses Mayer, son of Amschel, and he apparently added the Amschel, as in later generations.

- Mayer Amschel Rothschild married Guttle Schnapper (1753–1849), daughter of Wolf Salomon Schnapper, on 29 August 1770.
  - Schönche Jeannette Rothschild (1771–1859), married to Benedikt Moses Worms (1772–1824)
  - Amschel "Anselm" Mayer Rothschild (1773–1855)
  - Salomon Mayer Rothschild (1774–1855), married to Caroline Stern
    - See Rothschild banking family of Austria
  - Nathan Mayer Rothschild (1777–1836), married to Hannah Barent Cohen (1783–1850), daughter of Levi Barent Cohen
    - See Rothschild banking family of England
  - Isabella Rothschild (1781–1861), married to Bernhard Juda Sichel (1780–1862)
  - Babette Rothschild (1784–1869), married to Siegmund Leopold Beyfus (1786–1845)
  - Kalman "Carl" Mayer Rothschild (1788–1855), married to Adelheid Herz (1800–1853)
    - See Rothschild banking family of Naples
  - Julie Rothschild (1790–1815), married to Mayer Levin Beyfus (1790–1860)
  - Henriette "Jette" Rothschild (1791–1866), married to Abraham Montefiore (1788–1824) and mother of Charlotte Montefiore (1818–1854)
  - Jakob "James" Mayer Rothschild (1792–1868), married to Betty von Rothschild (1805–1886), daughter of Salomon Mayer Rothschild
    - See Rothschild banking family of France
