= Amschel Mayer Rothschild =

German banker (1773–1855)

Amschel Mayer von Rothschild
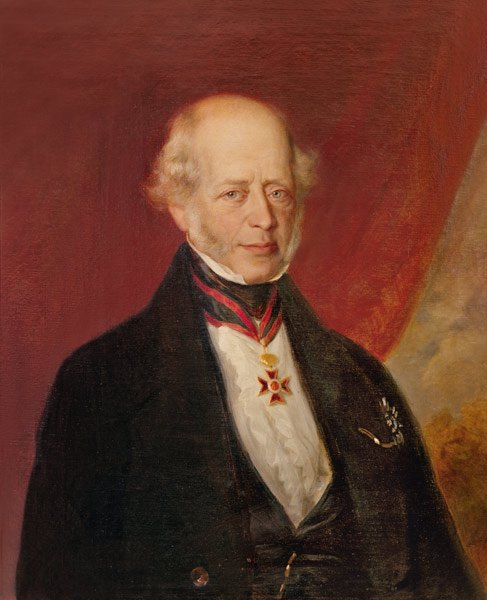
- Portrait by Moritz Daniel Oppenheim
- Born: 12 June 1773; Frankfurt
- Died: 6 December 1855 (aged 82); Frankfurt
- Occupation: Banker
- Title: Freiherr
- Father: Mayer Amschel Rothschild
- Relatives: Rothschild family

Amschel Mayer Freiherr von Rothschild (12 June 1773 – 6 December 1855) was a German Jewish banker of the prominent Rothschild family. He was the second child and eldest son of Mayer Amschel Rothschild (1744–1812), the founder of the dynasty, and Gutlé Rothschild (née Schnapper; 1753–1849).

On the death of Mayer Amschel in 1812, Amschel Mayer succeeded as head of the bank M. A. Rothschild & Söhne in Frankfurt, his brothers having been dispatched to set up banking houses in Paris, London, Naples, and Vienna. As Amschel Mayer died childless, his nephews (Anselm, son of Salomon, and Mayer Carl and Wilhelm Carl, sons of Carl) assumed responsibility for the business from 1855.

In 1817, he was ennobled by Francis II, Holy Roman Emperor, as Amschel Mayer von Rothschild, and he became a Freiherr (baron) in 1822. Amschel Mayer Rothschild was close to Orthodox Jewish circles, and he was referred to by Eastern European Jews as "the pious Rothschild" (Yiddish: der frummer Rothschild).

== Honours ==
- Commander of the Order of Leopold.
