= Sharps Pixley =

British bullion house

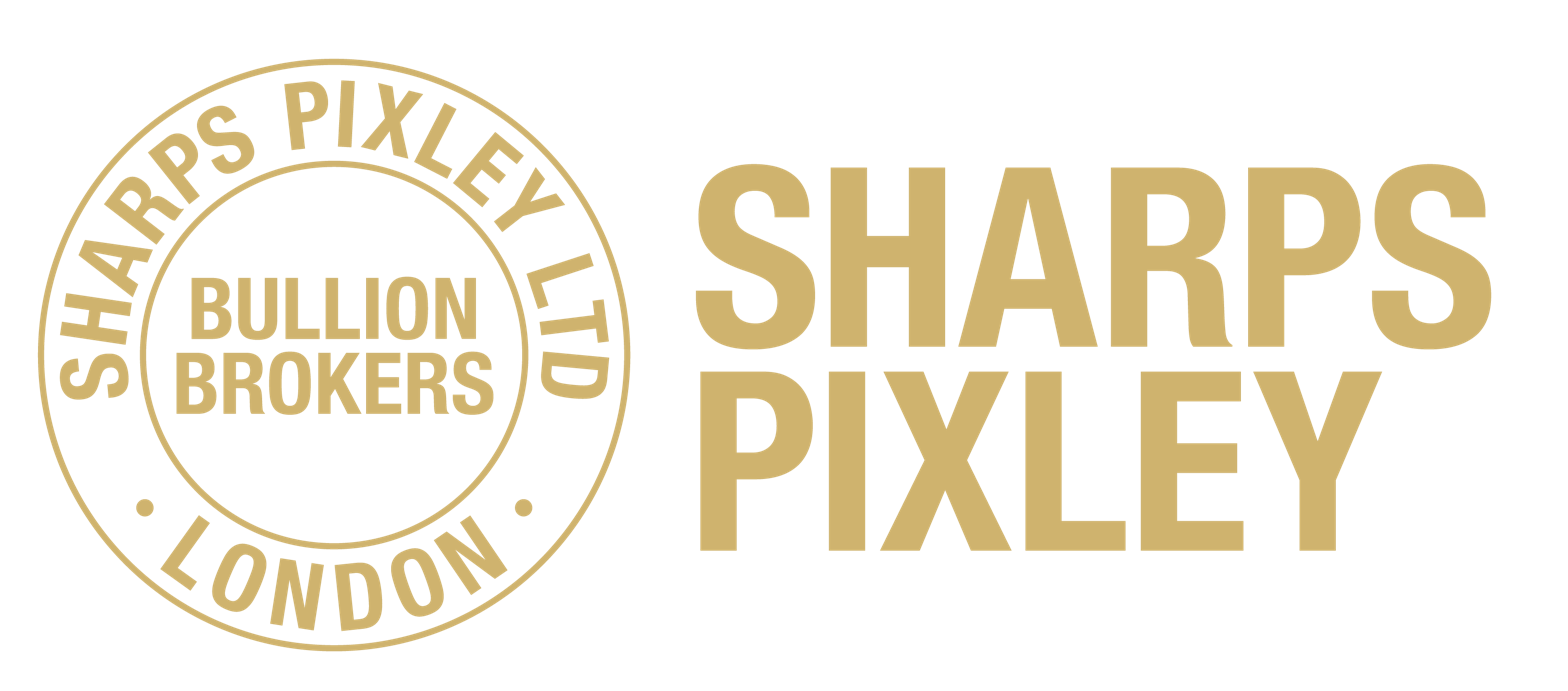
- Company type: bullion house
- Predecessor: Sharps Wilkins; Pixley & Abell
- Founded: 1957, in London
- Headquarters: London, United Kingdom
- Website: sharpspixley.com

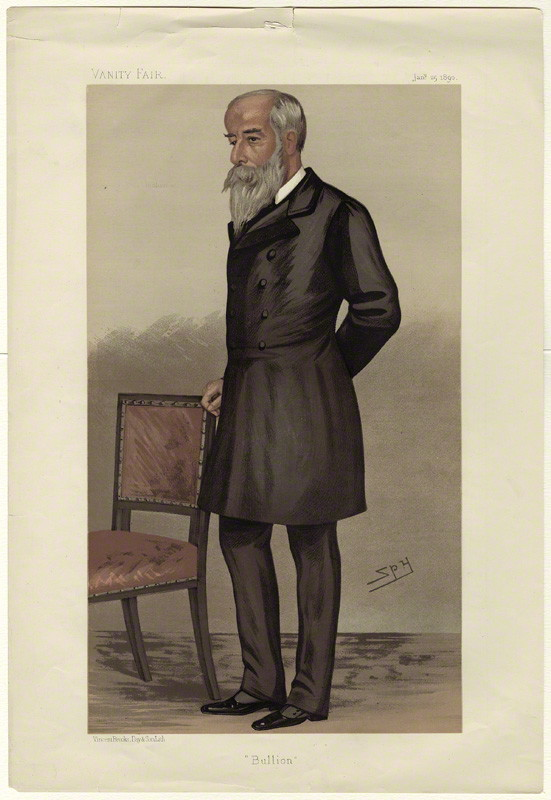
Stewart Pixley in 1890

Sharps Pixley was a British bullion house. It was formed in 1957 when two private bullion partnerships merged: Sharps Wilkins, founded in 1740, and Pixley & Abell, founded in 1852. It was one of the five firms that met twice daily for the London Gold Fixing, the others being N. M. Rothschild & Sons, Johnson Matthey, Mocatta & Goldsmid, and Samuel Montagu & Co. Sharps Pixley was bought by Kleinwort Benson in 1966, largely at the behest of the Bank of England.
