= Kleinwort Benson =

Investment bank in the UK

Coordinates: 51.51255°N 0.14378°W

- Type: Subsidiary
- Industry: Financial Services
- Founded: 1786; 240 years ago
- Defunct: 2016; 10 years ago
- Fate: Merged with SG Hambros to form Kleinwort Hambros
- Headquarters: London, England
- Owner: Société Générale

Kleinwort Benson was a leading investment bank that offered a wide range of financial services from offices throughout the United Kingdom and Channel Islands. Two families, the Kleinworts and the Bensons, founded two different merchant banks in London. They merged in 1961 to create Kleinwort Benson Lonsdale, later Kleinwort Benson. Following its acquisition by Société Générale in June 2016, it was merged with SG Hambros, already a subsidiary of Société Générale, to form Kleinwort Hambros in November 2016.

== History ==
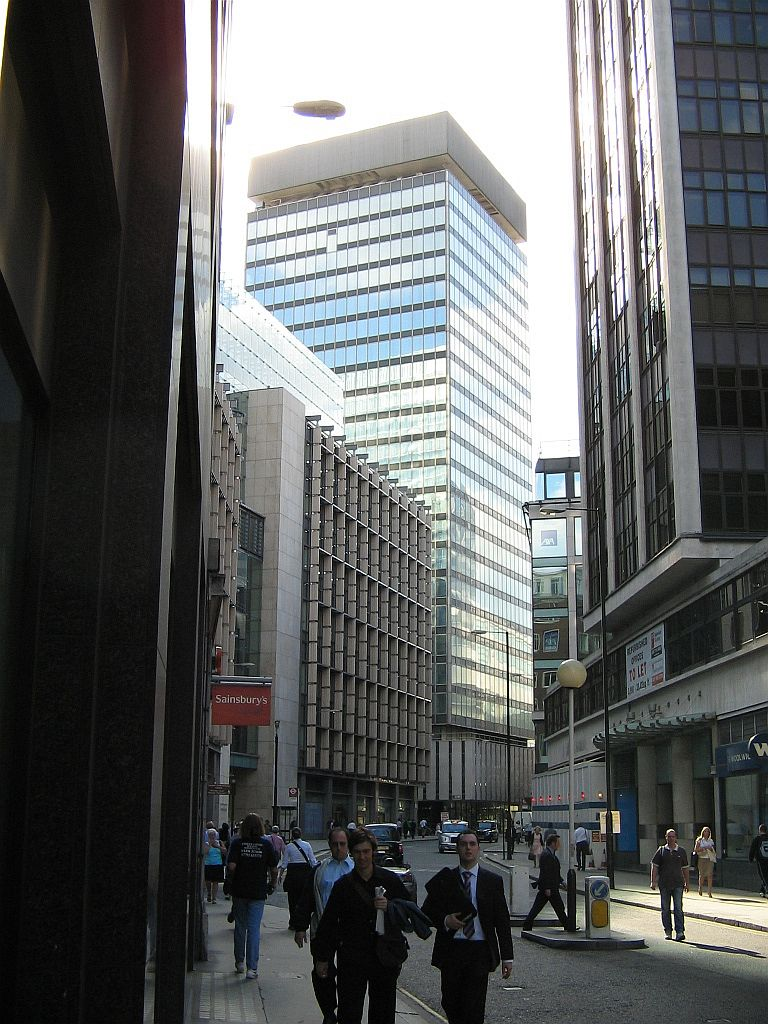
The 20 Fenchurch Street building occupied by Kleinwort Benson. It was demolished in 2007

=== Kleinworts ===
The earliest known Kleinwort to go into banking was 24-year-old Heinrich Kleinwort, a grandfather of Sir Alexander Drake Kleinwort, 1st Baronet. In 1786, Heinrich set up a partnership with Otto Mueller in Holstein to finance trade with England. Kleinworts established a successful trading business in Cuba, profiting from the expansion of the H. Upmann and Sons cigar business. Edward Cohen and James Drake joined the firm in the 1830s and for a while it was known as Drake, Kleinwort and Cohen; it was then renamed Kleinwort, Sons and Company in the 1880s.

The firm helped finance Francisco Franco's coup d'état in Spain by approving a credit of 800,000 pounds at 4% interest on 15 September 1937. A month later Kleinworts agreed another loan of 1,500,000 pounds sterling at 3%.

=== Robert Benson & Co. ===
In 1786, Robert Benson, a Quaker, joined with William Rathbone IV of the existing house of William Rathbone & Co. to form Rathbone & Benson, a Liverpool business trading mainly with America. Over the course of the 19th century, the Benson family, under the control of Robin Benson, grew its wealth through railway finance in Britain, Europe and America. For example, it became part of a syndicate that marketed shares in the Illinois Central Railroad in 1852.

In 1947 Robert Benson and Co. merged with Lonsdale Investment Trust (founded by Leo Lonsdale) to form Robert Benson, Lonsdale and Co. The Benson family interest in the group was watered down but operational control of bank remained with its chairman, Rex Benson.

=== Kleinwort Benson ===
Kleinworts and Robert Benson, Lonsdale and Co. merged to form Kleinwort Benson Lonsdale in 1961. The merged firm acquired the bullion dealer Sharps Pixley in 1966 thereby securing a seat on the London gold price fixing committee that met twice daily in the offices of N M Rothschild & Sons. Kleinwort Benson worked on several major mergers and acquisitions at this time including the merger of Cadbury with Schweppes in 1969.

The firm decided to enter the securities market buying Charlesworth and Co., a stock jobber, in October 1984 and Grieveson Grant, a leading stockbroker, in April 1986.

In the 1980s, Kleinwort Benson was a pioneer in privatisation. It managed the reprivatisation of British Aerospace, the first of the British Government's programme of disposals in 1981. It also managed the flotation of Cable & Wireless in the same year. It next advised on the privatisation of Associated British Ports in 1983. It went on to advise the British Government on the sale of 50.2% of British Telecom, the largest ever share issue at the time, in 1984. It assisted with the privatization of Enterprise Oil in the same year. Important private sector transactions at that time included the takeover of Harrods by the Fayed brothers in 1984.

The firm also worked on overseas privatisations advising the Italian government on the IPO of Enel in 1993. In the United Kingdom it advised on Carlton Communications' £723 million takeover of Central Television in the same year.

=== Dresdner Kleinwort ===
In 1995, Kleinwort Benson was acquired by Dresdner Bank and, as Dresdner Kleinwort, became its investment banking arm. It added global reach through the acquisition of the US investment bank Wasserstein Perella in 2001 (from Bruce Wasserstein). The Frankfurt branch of the bank was instrumental in initiating trading in emissions credits in 2003. In 2004, the Russian government hired Dresdner Kleinwort to value Yukos's Yuganskneftegaz which was later sold to Russian state oil major Rosneft. In January 2006, the bank became the target of a US$1.4 billion class action suit by six employees alleging bias and systematic discrimination against female workers.

In December 2008 Commerzbank, which was in the process of acquiring Dresdner Bank, decided to close Dresdner Kleinwort's Mergers & Acquisitions Unit. Then in March 2009 it became clear that the office in Japan would close. It also became clear that the capital markets and equities units would close and that advisory work would only be undertaken for Commerzbank's German clients.

In February 2009 the Commerzbank management announced that no bonuses would be paid across the Commerzbank group including Dresdner Kleinwort. This was clarified to mean that Front Office staff would receive 10% of the bonus promised in December 2008 but support functions would receive their full bonus. This, together with issues regarding severance payments and guaranteed bonus payments, led to a number of lawsuits. Jens-Peter Neumann, former head of Capital Markets sued in Germany in April 2009 for €1.5 million in severance pay. Former senior managers Martin Newson, Eduardo Listorti and Michael Adams sued but settled out of court. Other executives (Areski Iberrakene, Efstratios Hatzistefanis, Kaveh Taleghani and Stefan Guetter) won their bonus suits against the bank in August 2009. Additional cases were brought by Dresdner Kleinwort executive committee members John McIntyre, Bertrand Pinel and Alberto Piedra in August 2009 seeking €11 million. In September 2009, 72 former and current Dresdner Kleinwort front office employees sued for £30 million in disputed bonus payments.

=== BHF Kleinwort Benson Group ===
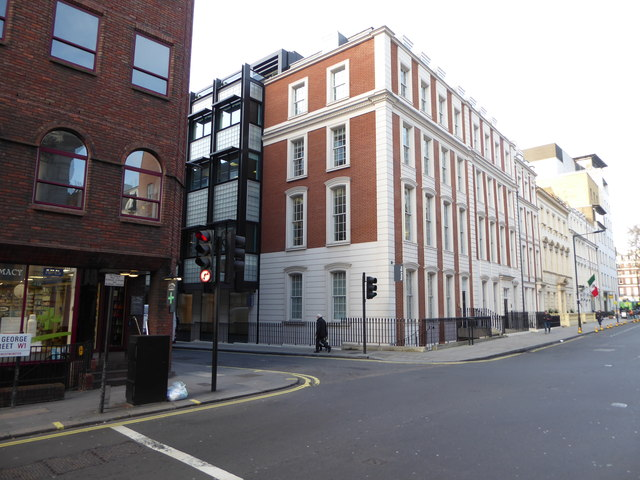
Kleinwort Benson's offices at St George Street in London

In September 2009 Commerzbank decided to abandon use of the Dresdner Kleinwort name and, in October 2009, sold the firm, by then renamed Kleinwort Benson, to RHJ International.

In July 2011, RHJ International announced that its subsidiary, Kleinwort Benson, was in exclusive negotiations with Deutsche Bank regarding a potential acquisition of BHF Bank, one of Germany's strongest banking brands, with operations in private banking, asset management, financial markets and corporate banking. In September 2012, it announced that it had reached agreement with Deutsche Bank for Kleinwort Benson to acquire BHF Bank for €384 million.

In November 2011 Saffron Tax Partners announced the acquisition of the private client tax compliance business from Kleinwort Benson. In December 2012 London-based independent advice firm SK Financial bought about 1,000 clients from Kleinwort Benson that Kleinwort Benson felt it could no longer support profitably after the implementation of the Retail Distribution Review. The bank moved to new premises at St George Street in London in 2012.

RHJ International became "BHF Kleinwort Benson Group" in March 2015 and was acquired by Oddo & Cie in early 2016. Then in June 2016, Société Générale acquired Kleinwort Benson from Oddo et Cie. It merged the bank with its existing private banking subsidiary SG Hambros in November 2016 to form Kleinwort Hambros.

== Notable current and former employees ==
=== Business ===
- Sir Alan Yarrow, former Lord Mayor of London (2014–2015)
- Bruce Wasserstein, former chairman and CEO of Lazard
- Xavier Rolet, London Stock Exchange Group, CEO
- Sir David Clementi, Prudential, Chairman (2002–2008)
- Sir Adrian Montague, Friends Provident, Chairman
- Callum McCarthy, HM Treasury, Non-executive board member
- Ronald Kramer, former President of Wynn Resorts; current CEO of Griffon Corporation
- Luke Johnson, Royal Society of Arts, Chairman
- The Hon. Sir Nicholas Redmayne (1938–2008), Joint Head of Equity Securities, Joint Chief Executive of Investment Banking with David Clementi, 1994—1996 and from 1995 chairman of KBIM.
- Máxima Zorreguieta, former vice-president at the department Emerging Markets, and queen consort of the Netherlands

=== Politics and public service ===
- Rahm Emanuel, Member of the U.S. House of Representatives (2003–2008); White House Chief of Staff (2008–2010)
- Peter Walker, Baron Walker of Worcester, Member of the British Parliament (1961–1992)

== Arms ==
Coat of arms of Kleinwort Benson
Notes Granted 30 July 1959 Crest On a wreath of the colours upon a mount Vert three trefoils slipped the centre one Or the outer ones Proper. Escutcheon Per chevron Or and Sable in chief two oak trees eradicated Proper fructed Gold in base a lion rampant also Gold a chief of the second bezantee. Supporters On either side a lion Or gorged with a collar Sable charged with a trefoil slipped Gold between two bezants in the paws a sprig of oak leaved and stalked Proper fructed also Gold. Motto Nil Sine Studio

== See also ==
- Gold Fixing
- Sharps Pixley

== Sources ==
- Parker, David (2009). The Official History of Privatisation Vol. I: The formative years 1970-1987. Vol. 1. Routledge. ISBN 978-0415469166.
- Wake, Jehanne (1997). Kleinwort Benson: The History of Two Families in Banking. Oxford University Press. ISBN 0-19-828299-0.
- Wilkins, Mira (2004). The History of Foreign Investment in the United States, 1914-1945. Harvard University Press. ISBN 978-0674013087.
