= Alain de Rothschild =

French banker, philanthropist (1910–1982)

Baron Alain de Rothschild
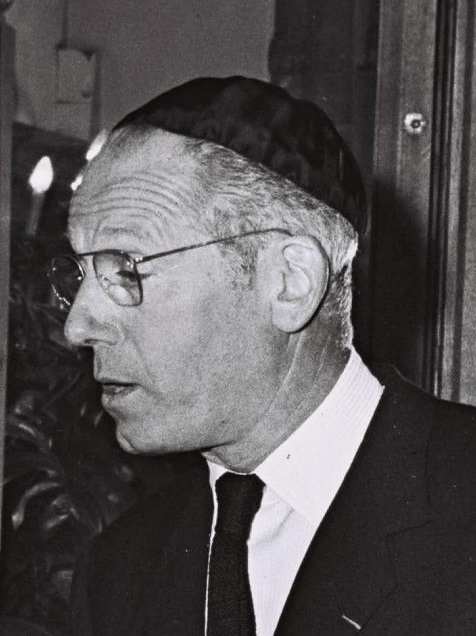
- Alain de Rothschild in 1964
- Title: President of the Council of French Jewish Institutions

Personal life
- Born: 7 January 1910 Paris, France
- Died: 17 October 1982 (aged 72) New York City, USA
- Buried: Paris, France
- Spouse: Mary Chauvin du Treuil (m. 1938)
- Children: Béatrice Rosenberg (née de Rothschild) (b. 1939); Éric de Rothschild (b. 1940); Robert de Rothschild (b. 1947)
- Relatives: Elie de Rothschild (brother); Guy de Rothschild (cousin); Pierre Rosenberg (son-in-law); Marie Angliviel de la Beaumelle (granddaughter); Saskia de Rothschild (granddaughter)
- Parent(s): Robert de Rothschild; Gabrielle Nelly Régine Beer
- Occupation: Banker, philanthropist

Religious life
- Religion: Judaism

Jewish leader
- Predecessor: Jean Rosenthal
- Successor: Théo Klein
- Position: President
- Organisation: Conseil Représentatif des Institutions juives de France
- Began: 1976
- Ended: 1982

Baron James Gustave Jules Alain de Rothschild (7 January 1910 – 17 October 1982) was a French banker and philanthropist.

== Early life ==
Alain de Rothschild was born on 7 January 1910 in Paris, France. His father was Baron Robert de Rothschild, who was a banker. His mother was Gabrielle Nelly Régine Beer. He was a member of the Rothschild family.

Alain de Rothschild studied at the École libre des Sciences politiques where he graduated in 1931.

During World War II, he was sent to a detention camp.

== Career ==
He started his career at de Rothschild Frères, later known as Banque Rothschild, the family investment bank, in 1946. He owned 25%.

He was the Chairman of the Investment Society of the North, the Society of Petroleum Investors, the Company of the North and the Discount Bank of France, all of which are owned by the Rothschild family.

He was a co-owner of Château Lafite Rothschild, a wine estate in Pauillac which produces Bordeaux wine.

== Philanthropy ==
He served as the President of the Conservatoire de Paris from 1954 to 1982, and the French Consistory from 1967 to 1982. He served as the Chairman of the Conseil Représentatif des Institutions juives de France from 1976 to 1982. In 1973, he became president of the Fondation Rothschild. His foundation, the Institut Alain de Rothschild, was shut down in 1995.

In the aftermath of the 1980 Paris synagogue bombing, he suggested French politicians did not care about what had happened, and questioned "the inexplicable impotence" of the French police. Through the CRIF, he negotiated with President Giscard d'Estaing for increased police forces to keep synagogues safe, and set up tactics to influence the outcome of the 1981 French presidential election.

He spoke out against the Goldenberg restaurant attack, also in Paris, shortly before his death.

== Honors ==
- Officer of the Legion of Honour
- Croix de Guerre

== Personal life ==
He married Mary Chauvin du Treuil on 26 January 1938. They had three children:

1. Béatrice Juliette Ruth de Rothschild (1939–), married to Armand Angliviel de la Beaumelle (m. 1962, div. 1962) and Pierre Rosenberg (m. 1981).
2. Éric de Rothschild (1940–), married to Maria-Beatrice Caracciolo Di Forino (m. 1983)
3. Robert de Rothschild (1947–), married to Debra Elisa Cohen (m. 1999, wid. 2001)

In 2006, his daughter Béatrice sold part of his rare books collection with the auction house Sotheby's.

== Death ==
When President François Mitterrand was elected in 1981, Rothschild moved to New York City. A year later he died there of a heart attack on 17 October 1982 at the Lenox Hill Hospital on the Upper East Side. His funeral took place in Paris, where he was buried.

== Legacy ==
The Fondation Rothschild – Institut Alain de Rothschild, named in his honour, funds housing for those in need as well as Jewish causes.
