= Éric de Rothschild =

French banker

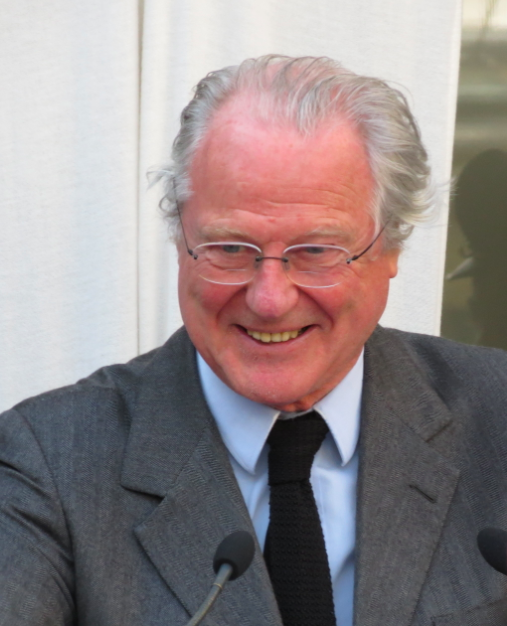
- Éric de Rothschild in 2013
- Born: 3 October 1940 (age 85); New York City
- Occupation: Banker
- Title: Baron
- Spouse: Maria-Beatrice Caracciolo di Forino
- Children: 3, including Saskia de Rothschild
- Parent(s): Alain de Rothschild; Mary Chauvin du Treuil
- Relatives: Élie de Rothschild (uncle); Pierre Rosenberg (brother-in-law)

Baron Éric Alain Robert David de Rothschild (born 3 October 1940) is a French banker.

== Early life ==
Éric de Rothschild was born on 3 October 1940 in New York City, the son of Mary Chauvin du Treuil and Alain de Rothschild. His mother had fled to the United States while pregnant during World War II while his father remained behind and ended up as a German prisoner of war. His uncle was Élie de Rothschild.

== Career ==
He took over the management of Château Lafite Rothschild from his uncle in 1973 and turned it from a "traditional, perhaps not precise, instrument to an artistic, professional one", a move that enabled the vineyard to remain competitive during the 1980s when international wines became more competitive. In 1984, he bought the vineyard Château Rieussec.

In 1982, he was managing the de Rothschild bank in Paris with his cousin David René de Rothschild when it was nationalized by François Mitterrand's government.

He is the chairman of the UK Private Banking & Trust. He is on the supervisory board of Paris Orléans, which manages €28.3 billion of assets. From 1994 to 2004, he managed the archives of the bank Rothschild Frères before transferring it to The Rothschild Archive.

== Personal life ==
He is married to Maria-Beatrice Caracciolo di Forino, a painter. He has two sons and one daughter.

He is the honorary president of the Grand Synagogue of Paris.

He has been the chairman of the Mémorial de la Shoah, a museum about The Holocaust in Paris, since 2001. In 2010, with Serge Klarsfeld, he revealed the existence of a document that contained a law project regarding the fate of Jewish people in France, and annotated by the Maréchal Pétain. In 2012, he called for the teaching of the Holocaust in French schools, to combat antisemitism and all forms of racism.

== Awards ==
- 1993: Wine Spectator's Distinguished Service Award
- 2006: Southern Wine & Spirits of America Lifetime Achievement Award
