= Mocatta =

English Sephardic bullion brokers

Mocatta (also de Mattos Mocatta, Nunes Marchena Mocatta, Lumbroso de Mattos Mocatta and Lumbrozo de Mattos Mocatta) is a surname.

The Mocatta family is an Anglo-Jewish family that traces its ancestry to the Sephardic Jewish communities of Spain and Portugal prior to the Inquisition. The family's forebears initially sought refuge in Amsterdam and Venice, before immigrating to England in the 1650s. They were among the first twelve Jewish families admitted by Cromwell. In London in 1671, Moses Mocatta established the firm that became Mocatta & Goldsmid; for 300 years it was the world’s leading bullion broker. Although the family sold their stake in the company in the late twentieth century and exited the bullion business, the family continues its tradition of business and charity.

The family became known for philanthropy, leadership and sponsorship of arts and letters, particularly in the United Kingdom. Long involved in finance and the law, they are considered to be one of the principal families in the "cousinhood" of senior Anglo-Jewish families, the de facto Anglo-Jewish aristocracy.

== The Mocatta firm ==
In 1671, Moses Mocatta established a business in London that became Mocatta & Goldsmid. This was the foundation of the modern gold and silver market. The Mocatta business was the world's leading bullion broker through the 18th century, and first traded with India in 1676 and with China in the 1720s. Licensed at the Royal Exchange from 1710, for more than a century, the family firm acted as exclusive bullion brokers to the Bank of England. In 1810, the Mocatta firm's managing partner appeared before Parliament's Select Committee on the High Price of Gold Bullion, when asked: 'Are there any other dealers in gold but yours', he replied, 'I apprehend none of considerable amount.'

Mocatta was later involved in market stabilisations. Edgar Mocatta had a notable role in ending the Indian silver crisis of 1913. In the late 20th century, the Mocatta firm was closely involved in providing liquidity and stability following the Hunt silver corner of 1980. In association with NM Rothschild, in 1897 and 1919 respectively, Mocatta & Goldsmid established the price discovery mechanisms for silver and gold used into the 21st century. Between 1671 and the 1970s, the Mocatta firm was headed by just seven men.

== Involvement in charitable and Jewish institutions ==
The family was involved in the establishment of Bevis Marks, the UK's oldest synagogue (1701), the Board of Deputies of British Jews (1760), and the West London Synagogue (1840). The family were active in the struggle for Jewish parliamentary emancipation.

Ten members of the family have served as Chairman or President of the West London Synagogue of British Jews. Moses Mocatta served as President of the Board of Deputies, and family members have participated in communal leadership positions such as the Board of Shechita, Chairman of Jews’ College, and Elders of Bevis Marks. The family also participated in the Oxford and St George's Club (Bernhard Baron St George's Jewish Settlement) and other such initiatives for the relief of the poor.

The family led the Jewish community's efforts for the relief of famine in Ireland in the mid-19th century.

The family were leaders in the protest at the persecution of Jews in Romania and Bessarabia.

In the 19th and 20th centuries, the family were leaders in the Board of Guardians and Trustees for the Relief of the Jewish Poor.

Three members of the Mocatta family served as Honorary Life Governors of the Royal London Ophthalmic Hospital, Moorfields.

David Mocatta donated funding for major parts of the building of the Royal Marsden, the first hospital in the world dedicated to the study and treatment of cancer.

Frederic Mocatta was a founder of the Industrial Dwellings Society, which provided the London poor with adequate housing. Today it provides low-income key workers with low-cost housing.

== Notable members ==
The family features in the Anglo-Jewish "Cousinhood", the aristocracy of related, socially-prominent Jewish families that includes the Rothschilds, the Goldsmids, the Montagus, the Montefiores and the Samuels. Prominent people with the surname Mocatta include:

- Isaac Mocatta, a doctor in Leghorn who in 1638 married Rachel, daughter of Moses Cordovero.
- Isaac Mocatta (1765-1801), of whom Walter Savage Landor wrote, '...In the number of my acquaintance, there is none more valuable, there is not one more lively, more inquiring, more regular; there is not one more virtuous, more beneficent, more liberal, more tender in heart or more true in friendship, than my friend Mocatta – he is also a Jew.'
- David Mocatta (1806–1882), a British architect, the first Jewish member of a profession in Great Britain. Architect of Brighton Station.
- Frederic David Mocatta (1828–1905), 'Perhaps the most popular man in the Jewish community. He holds several offices but they are no measure of the deep and extensive interest he takes in the welfare of the community as a whole.'
- Mary Ada Mocatta (1836–1905), wife of Frederic David Mocatta, William Holman Hunt's model for the Virgin Mary. Described by Hunt's biographer as, 'Distinguished alike for her amiability and beauty.'
- Dr. (Annie) Mildred Mocatta (1887–1984), a medical doctor and art collector in South Australia.
- Sir Alan Abraham Mocatta, OBE QC (1907–1990), an English judge and leader of the Spanish & Portuguese Jewish Community of London, President of the Restrictive Practices Court, Chairman of the Mocatta Committee on Cheque Endorsement, joint editor of Scrutton on Charter Parties (14th–17th editions)
- William Hugh Mocatta (1861–1959), a Judge of the District Court of NSW.
- Rachel Mocatta, mother of Sir Moses Montefiore
- Laura Mocatta, wife of Sir Elly Kadoorie, mother of Lord Kadoorie and Sir Horace Kadoorie. Lived in Hong Kong and Shanghai 1898-1918. The first woman to drive a car in China.
- Edgar Mocatta (1879–1957), known as the "Silver King," he dominated the silver market during his partnership in Mocatta & Goldsmid (1900–1957).
- Moses Mocatta (1768–1857), bullion broker and scholar of Hebrew language and literature.
- Jacob Mocatta (1821–1877), essayist and, 'An eminent merchant... well-known for his benevolence and untiring exertions for the amelioration of the Jewish poor of the metropolis.'

== See also ==
- Mocatta (name)
- ScotiaMocatta
