= Mocatta (name) =

Mocatta is a Sephardic Anglo-Jewish surname associated with the Mocatta family. Notable people with the name include:

- Alan Mocatta (1907–1990), British judge
- David Mocatta (1806–1882), British architect
- Elias Mocatta (1798–1881), British merchant and financier
- Frederick David Mocatta (1828–1905), British financier and philanthropist

== See also ==
- ScotiaMocatta
