= New Court =

New Court (Rothschild Bank)
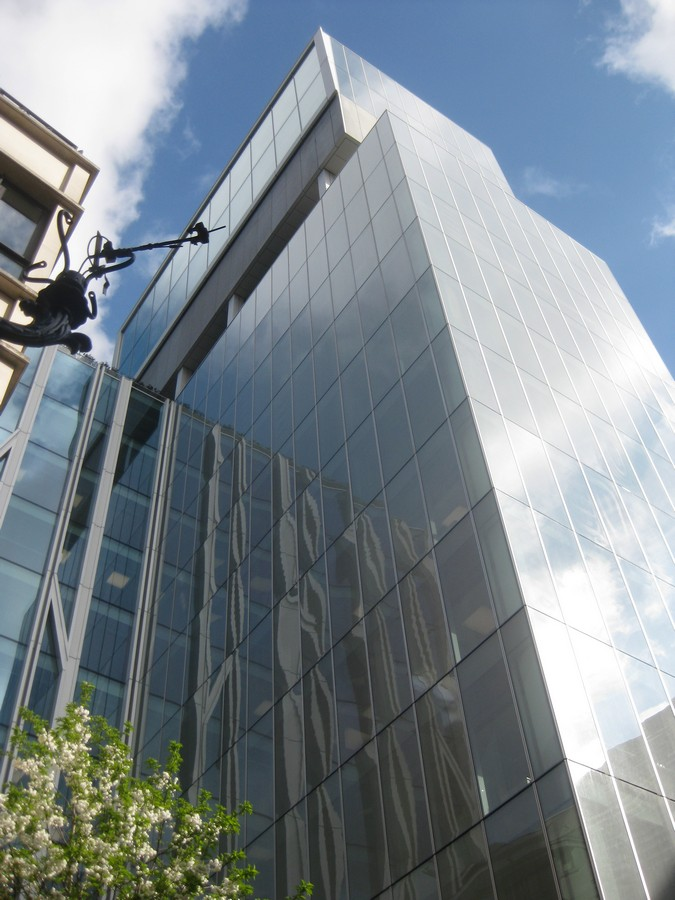

- Location within Greater London

General information
- Type: Office
- Location: London, England
- Coordinates: 51°30′44″N 0°5′20″W
- Completed: 2011
- Owner: Rothschild

Design and construction
- Architects: Rem Koolhaas; Office for Metropolitan Architecture

New Court (also known as The Rothschild Headquarters) is a collection of proximate buildings in London having served as the global headquarters of the Rothschild investment bank since 1809. The current building is the fourth incarnation of the Rothschild offices at the same street address. Until 2004, the world price of gold was fixed daily at this building.

== 1809 to 1868: First incarnation and early history ==
After leaving Frankfurt, Nathan Mayer Rothschild needed a location where he could build his banking business and continue his merchant activities as well as house his family. Rothschild acquired a lease at No. 2 New Court Street, St Swithin's Lane in 1809.

In 1824 at New Court, Nathan Mayer Rothschild and company formed Alliance Assurance (later becoming Royal & Sun Alliance, and today known as RSA Insurance Group)."

== 1868 to 1962: Second incarnation ==
Lionel de Rothschild (who had succeeded his father Nathan in 1838 as head of the firm) hired architect Thomas Marsh Nelson to design a building in the Italianate style which was completed in 1868.

=== Beginning of gold fixing ===
On 12 September 1919, New Court became the location where the global price of gold was fixed.

=== Second World War ===
During Second World War, The Rothschild bank moved much of its staff to the Rothschild estate at Tring Park. In a 1941 Nazi air raid, St Swithin's Lane was struck with many buildings being damaged.

== 1962 to 2011: Third incarnation ==
As the firm continued to see growth, it again outgrew New Court. Although the idea of extending the buildings vertically was posed, the Rothschild family ultimately decided to develop a new office. Rothschild chose Fitzroy Robinson & Partners as architects for a building which was completed in 1962.

== 2011 to present: Fourth incarnation ==
By the early twenty-first century, the Rothschild Bank had again outgrown the buildings. Architect Rem Koolhaas of OMA was selected to design the new headquarters for Rothschild which was completed in 2011.
