= Saskia de Rothschild =

French journalist and businesswoman (born 1987)

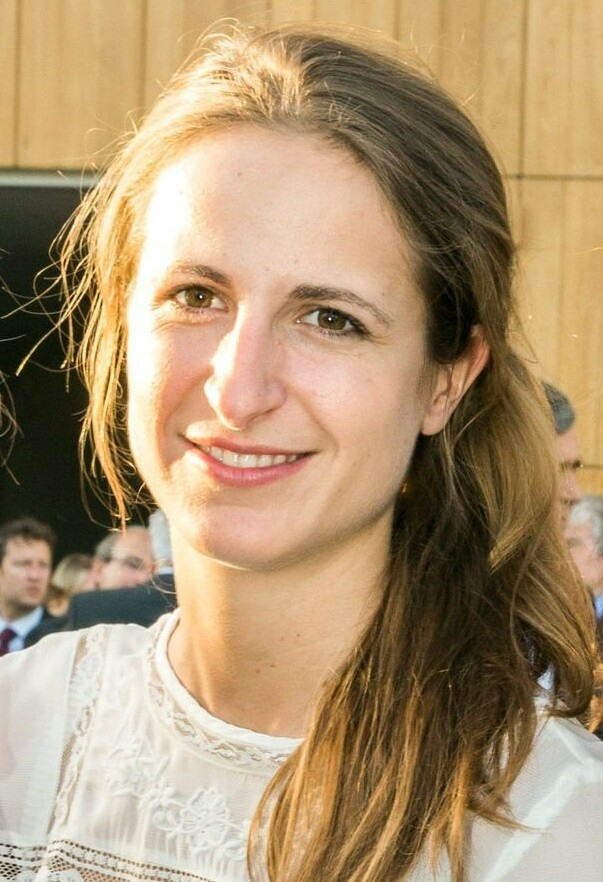
- Born: Saskia Anna Esther Maria del Mar de Rothschild; 29 April 1987 (age 39)
- Education: HEC Paris; Columbia University
- Occupation: businesswoman
- Parent(s): Maria-Beatrice Caracciolo Di Forino; Éric de Rothschild
- Relatives: Alain de Rothschild (grandfather)
- Family: Rothschild banking family of France

Saskia Anna Esther Maria del Mar de Rothschild (born April 29, 1987) is a French journalist and businesswoman. She became chairwoman of the Domaines Barons de Rothschild in 2018 and chief executive officer in 2021.

== Biography ==
She was born on April 29, 1987. She is a member of the Rothschild family and a descendant of James Mayer de Rothschild, founder of the French branch of the Rothschild family. Her father is Éric de Rothschild and her mother is Maria-Beatrice Caracciolo Di Forino, an Italian painter.

She received a dual degree from HEC Paris and the Indian Institute of Management Bangalore. She also received a master's degree from Columbia University Graduate School of Journalism. As a reporter, she worked for International New York Times and La Nación, spending time in Argentina and West Africa.

In 2018, she succeeded her father as chairman of the Domaines Barons de Rothschild, which includes Château Lafite Rothschild, becoming the youngest person leading a Premier Grand Cru Bordeaux estate. In 2021, she became chief executive officer and director general of the winery.

She is fluent in English, French, and Spanish.
