= Peter Smith (British businessman) =

British businessman (born 1946)

- Born: 5 August 1946 (age 79)
- Education: Mill Hill School
- Alma mater: University of Southampton; Wharton School of the University of Pennsylvania
- Occupation: Businessman
- Spouse: Cherry Blandford
- Parent(s): Dudley Vaughan Smith; Beatrice Ellen Sketcher

Peter Smith (born 5 August 1946) is a British businessman. He is the former chairman of Savills.

== Early life ==
Peter Smith was born on 5 August 1946. He is the son of Dudley Vaughan Smith and Beatrice Ellen Sketcher.

Smith was educated at the Mill Hill School. He graduated from the University of Southampton, where he earned a BSc. He subsequently graduated from the Advanced Management Program at the Wharton School of the University of Pennsylvania.

== Career ==
Smith was Senior Partner of PricewaterhouseCoopers from 1994 to 2002. He served as the Chairman of Coopers & Lybrand from 1994 to 1996. He was the deputy chairman of The Equitable Life Assurance Society from 2001 to 2010. He served as the chairman of Savills from 2004 to 2016.

Smith was the deputy chairman of The Equitable Life Assurance Society from 2001 to 2010. He was the chairman of the Templeton Emerging Markets Investment Trust from 2007 to 2015. He was a non-executive director of Associated British Foods from 2007 to 2016. He has served as a director of N M Rothschild & Sons since 2001.

== Personal life ==
Smith married Cherry Blandford in 1971. They have two sons.
