= Frederick David Mocatta =

English financier and philanthropist

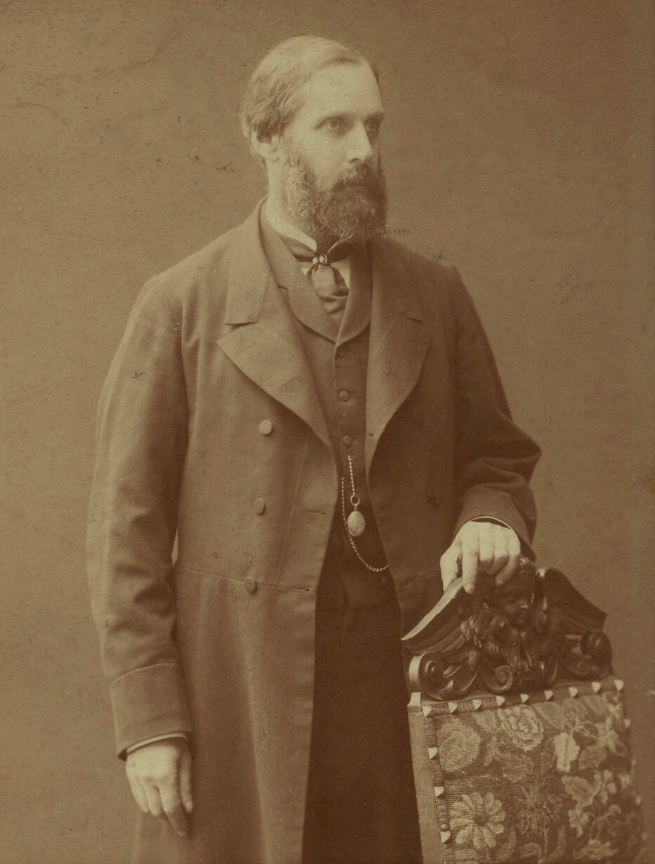
- Born: 15 January 1828
- Died: 16 January 1905 (aged 77)
- Occupations: Financier and philanthropist
- Known for: From a notable Anglo-Jewish family

Frederick David Mocatta (1828–1905), also known as Frederic David Mocatta, was an English financier and philanthropist from a notable Anglo-Jewish family.

== Life ==
Mocatta was a partner of the London bullion broker, Mocatta & Goldsmid (established in 1684) and directed it from 1857 to 1874. After he had retired from the business in 1874 he devoted himself to works of public and private benevolence, especially in the deprived East End of London. Besides this he was a patron of learning and himself an author of historical works, the chief of which was The Jews of Spain & Portugal and the Inquisition. On the occasion of his 70th birthday, he was presented with a testimonial from more than 200 philanthropic and literary institutions.

The Anglo-Jewish Historical Exhibition (1887) owed its inception to Mocatta. He bequeathed his fine library to the Jewish Historical Society of England, of which he was at one time president. This library formed the basis of the collections which are now included in the Mocatta Library, founded in his memory, and located at the University of London (University College, Gower Street). A fountain was erected to his memory by the people of East London, outside St Botolph's Church, Aldgate.

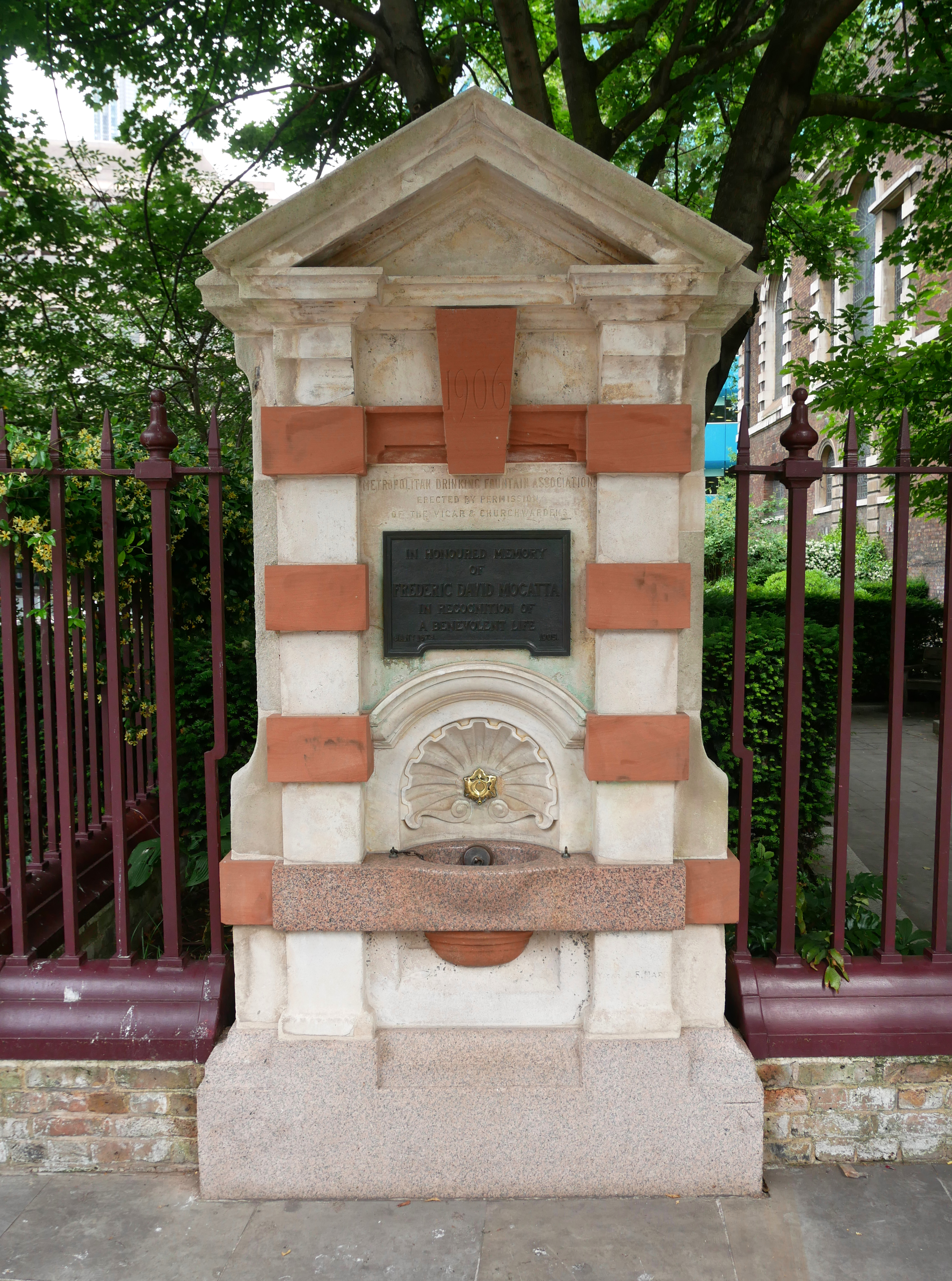
Drinking fountain outside St Botolph's Church, Aldgate, erected in 1906 in memory of Mocatta by the Metropolitan Drinking Fountain and Cattle Trough Association.

A man of letters, Mocatta had vast correspondences with the great and the good of his era. In matters of religion, he was observant and belonged not only to two Orthodox synagogues but also to the West London Synagogue, a Reform congregation that his family had played a prominent part in founding in London.

== Death ==
He died on 16 January 1905 and is buried at Balls Pond Road Cemetery.

== See also ==
- Mocatta family
- ScotiaMocatta
