= Élie de Rothschild =

French banker and art collector

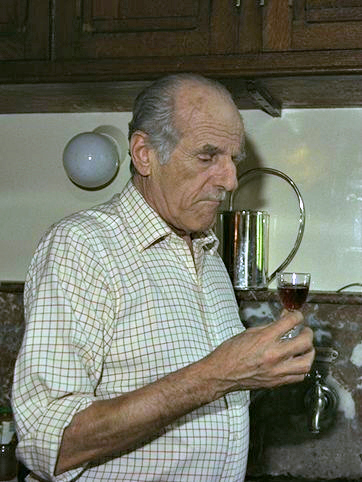
- Élie de Rothschild at Royaumont in 1994
- Born: 29 May 1917; Paris
- Died: 6 August 2007 (aged 90); Scharnitz
- Spouse: Liliane Fould-Springer (m. 1947; died 2003)
- Children: 3

Élie Robert de Rothschild (29 May 1917 – 6 August 2007) was the guardian of the French branch of the Rothschild family banking dynasty. He followed his father as a partner in the family bank, de Rothschild Frères, and ran the Château Lafite-Rothschild premier cru claret vineyard from 1946 to 1974.

== Lineage ==
Élie de Rothschild was the younger son of Baron Robert de Rothschild and Nelly Beer. His father was a partner in de Rothschild Frères with his cousin, Baron Édouard Alphonse James de Rothschild. His mother was the daughter of Edmond Beer, a great-great-niece of the composer Giacomo Meyerbeer, and elder sister of Marie-Louise Beer, who married Lionel Nathan de Rothschild from the English branch of the Rothschild family. Élie and his siblings (Diane, Alain and Cécile) were brought up at Château de Laversine, near Chantilly, and at the family mansion at 23 avenue de Marigny near the Elysée Palace in Paris.

== World War II service ==
He and his brother served as officers in a cavalry regiment—the Anciens 11èmes Cuirassiers—when Nazi Germany invaded France in 1940. Both were captured by the Nazis close to the Belgian border during World War II. Élie was taken to the prisoner of war camp Oflag X-B at Nienberg near Hamburg. After being discovered planning to escape, he was taken to Oflag IV-C at Colditz Castle, then to Oflag X-C at Lübeck, one of the toughest POW camps. There, he was reunited with his brother. Despite being persons of Jewish descent, both were treated by the Wehrmacht as captured officers. He was released in early 1944. Elie later recounted that, despite the harsh condition of the prison, he had been treated well and respectfully throughout.

While in Colditz, Élie had written to his childhood sweetheart Baroness Liliane Fould-Springer and asked her to marry him, which they did by proxy by 1942—Élie being allowed to take his marriage vows while imprisoned. Her mother thought her foolish to take on the Rothschild name with the Nazis in control of France. However, they were not troubled during the Nazi occupation. The Fould-Springers had extensive interests in Austria, and one branch of the family owned Château Beychevelle, a Bordeaux estate close to Château Lafite in Pauillac in the Médoc.

== Post-war life ==
After the war, Élie, Alain and their wives shared the family mansion at avenue de Marigny, which had been used as the Luftwaffe headquarters during the war. Élie and his family moved to 11 rue Masseran in the 1950s, where he displayed his great collection of art, including works by Rembrandt, Gainsborough, Dubuffet and Picasso. This collection was described in the book Great Private Collections, by Douglas Cooper; when Alvar Gonzales Palacios discovered a Dancer of Canova, he researched its history, and found out that, for a while, it had been in the Hotel Massaran, attributed to Carpeaux.

Élie and his brother assisted their cousin, Guy de Rothschild, to rebuild the Rothschild Frères investment bank, and its Compagnie des chemins de fer du Nord subsidiary. Élie took charge of Château Lafite-Rothschild, the premier cru Pauillac vineyard in the Médoc, in 1946, which he owned jointly with Alain, Guy and their English cousin Jimmy de Rothschild. Élie became president of the family's Compagnie des chemins de fer de Paris à Lyon et à la Méditerranée (PLM) in 1956, diversifying into hotels, motels and restaurants.

=== Offshore business ===
He built a web of at least 20 secrecy-cloaked trusts in the South Pacific between 1996 and 2003, some of which continued operating after his death in 2007. As documents from the Offshore leaks revealed at least 20 trusts and 10 holding companies were set up for Rothschild in the Cook Islands, with typically opaque names including, fittingly, ″Anon Trust″. The companies have a common shareholder called ″Mandalor Limited″, an equally opaque company based in Saint Vincent and the Grenadines.

Élie was a friend of Prince Aly Khan and Gianni Agnelli. In 1954, when Liliane was out of town, Élie was introduced to divorcée Pamela Churchill (later Pamela Harriman). According to Élie, "She was sweet, charming and pretty. I wanted to go to bed with her and I did." Nevertheless, Liliane quickly saw off her rival. When the Duke of Windsor asked her: "Which Rothschild is the lover of Pamela Churchill?' she replied: "My husband, Sir". This remark undermined Pamela as much as any other retributive strikes and presently the affair receded. His nephew Éric de Rothschild, son of Alain, took over at Château Lafite-Rothschild in 1974.

== Death ==
Élie died of a heart attack when on vacation at his hunting lodge near the village of Scharnitz outside Innsbruck in Austria. His wife predeceased him in 2003. His son is married to Nili Limon, the daughter of Mordechai Limon, commander of the Israel Navy in the 1950s.

== Sources ==
- Mssr. Rothschild's Tribute at Respectance.com
- Reflected Glory: the Life of Pamela Churchill Harriman, Sally Bedell Smith, 1996. Simon & Schuster. ISBN 0-684-80950-8
- Obituary, The Daily Telegraph, 7 August 2007
- Obituary, The Times, 8 August 2007
- Obituary, The Independent, 9 August 2007
