= René-Pierre Azria =

French businessman (born 1956)

- Born: 1956 (age 69–70); France
- Education: HEC Paris; Pierre and Marie Curie University; London Business School; New York University
- Occupation: French businessman

René-Pierre Azria is a French businessman.

== Personal life ==
Azria holds an MBA. degree from École des Hautes Études Commerciales (France), a Bachelor of Mathematics from University of Paris-Jussieu and an International Management Degree from London Business School and the Stern Graduate School of New York University.

In 1993, he married fiction writer Maria Alexis Winter.

== Business ==
René-Pierre Azria has been a Managing Director of the Blackstone-Indosuez joint-venture and President of Financière Indosuez Inc. in New York City.

He joined N M Rothschild & Sons worldwide (head of the Technology Media Telecom practice of Rothschild in the United States) in 1996 as Global Partner. During this time, he supervised the takeover of Luxxotica on Oakley.

Since 2008, Azria is the founder and CEO of the United States advisory firm Tegris LLC, a private investment bank.

== Honors ==
- Herbert Lehman Prize of the American Jewish Committee (2010)
