= Château Rieussec =

Coordinates: 44.53875°N 0.31134°W

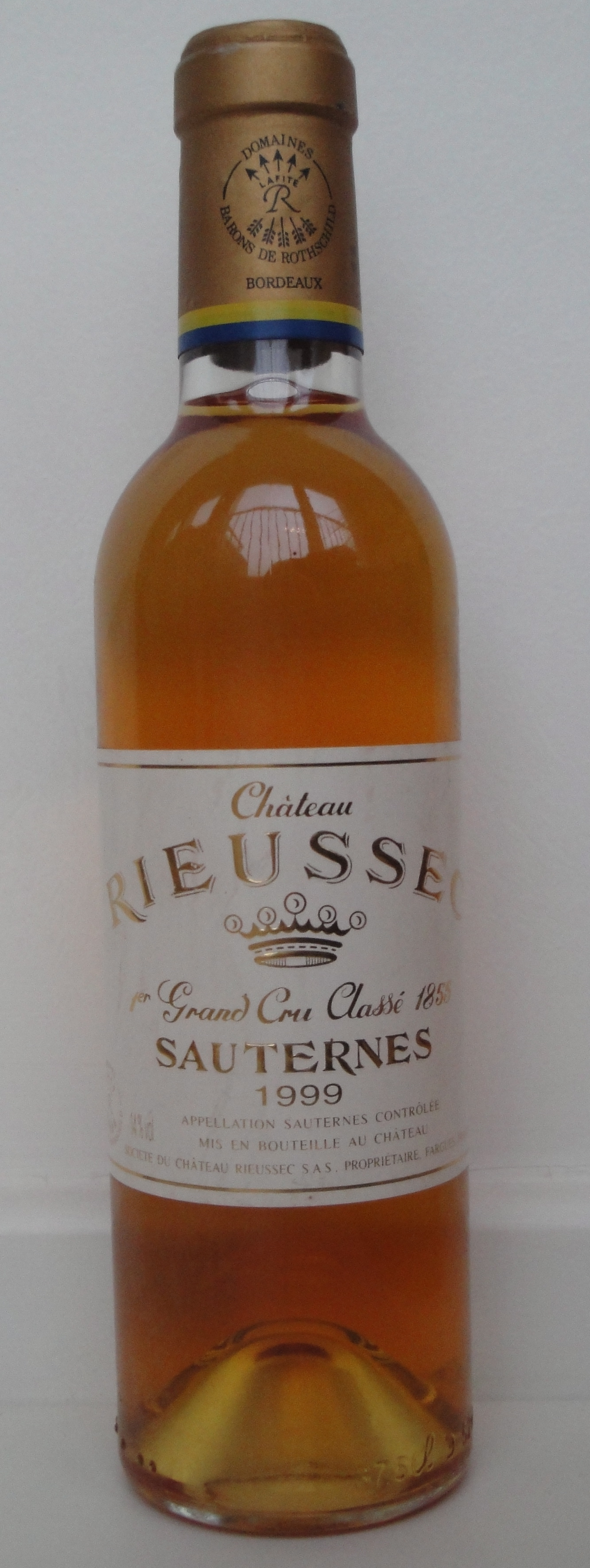
A half bottle of 1999 Château Rieussec.

Château Rieussec is a sweet white wine ranked as Premier Cru Classé (French, “First Growth”) in the original Bordeaux Wine Official Classification of 1855. Belonging to the Sauternes appellation in Gironde, in the region of Graves, the winery is located in the commune of Fargues.

== History ==
The Rieussec estate was the property of the monks of Carmes de Langon in the 18th century. Following the French Revolution, church property was confiscated by the state and auctioned off. In about 1790, Rieussec was bought in this fashion by a Mr. Marheilhac, who at this time was also the owner of Château La Louvière in Léognan. The owner at the time of the 1855 classification, when Rieussec was classified a first growth, was a Mr. Mayne. After that, Rieussec had a long succession of owners: Charles Crepin bought in around 1870, Paul Defolie in 1892, Mr. Edgar Bannel a well known banker of Bordeaux in 1907, the Gasqueton family (also owners of Château Calon-Ségur in Saint Estèphe), the American P. F. Berry (brother-in-law of the Vicomte de Bouzet) during the war, Mr. Balaresque in 1957 and Albert Vuillier in 1971.

In 1984, Rieussec was bought by Domaines Barons de Rothschild, the owners of Château Lafite Rothschild. The Rothschilds invested in a new cellar in 1989, and strove to increase quality by better selection of the grapes, which also led to reduced production in the 1990s. In the 1993 vintage, one of three difficult Bordeaux vintages in a row, no Château Rieussec grand vin was produced at all out of quality considerations. One of the more recent recognitions for quality was when Château Rieussec 2001 was selected as Wine Spectator's Wine of the Year in 2004.

== Production ==
The vineyards of Château Rieussec cover 93 hectares (230 acres) and border on those of Château d'Yquem in the west. They are planted to 90% Sémillon, 7% Sauvignon and 3% Muscadelle.

Four wines are produced, of which three from the Sauternes appellation: the classified growth Château Rieussec, the second wine Carmes de Rieussec, and Château de Cosse. Furthermore, a dry white wine from the Bordeaux AOC, is produced under the name « R » de Rieussec, using a blend of Sémillon and Sauvignon Blanc, and 20% new oak.

Château Rieussec is aged from 16 to 26 months in barrel, depending on the vintage, typically using 55% new barrels.

Average total production is around 10 000 cases annually, of which about 6 000 cases Château Rieussec. There was no production in 1993 and half the average production in 2000.
