= Gold fixing =

Setting of the price of gold

The London Gold Fixing (or Gold Fix) is the setting of the price of gold that takes place via a dedicated conference line. It was formerly held on the London premises of Nathan Mayer Rothschild & Sons by the members of The London Gold Market Fixing Ltd.

The benchmark is determined twice each business day of the London bullion market (the exceptions to this being Christmas Eve and New Year's Eve when there is only one fixing in the morning). It is designed to fix a price for settling contracts between members of the London bullion market, but the gold fixing informally provides a recognized rate that is used as a benchmark for pricing the majority of gold products and derivatives throughout the world's markets. The LBMA gold price is set twice every business day at 10:30AM and 3:00PM, London time, in United States dollars (USD). Prices are available in sixteen other currencies—including British pounds, Canadian dollars, Chinese renminbi, and euros—but they are indicative prices for settlement between LBMA members only.

The current 14 participants in the fixing are the Bank of China, the Bank of Communications, Coins 'N Things, the Industrial and Commercial Bank of China, INTL FCStone, Jane Street Global Trading, HSBC Bank USA, JPMorgan Chase, Koch Supply and Trading, Marex Financial, Morgan Stanley, Standard Chartered, the Bank of Nova Scotia, and the Toronto-Dominion Bank.

== History ==
On 12 September 1919 at 11:00 am, the five principal gold bullion traders and refiners of the day (N.M. Rothschild & Sons, Mocatta & Goldsmid, Pixley & Abell, Samuel Montagu & Co., and Sharps Wilkins) performed the first London gold fixing, thus becoming the five founding members. The gold price was determined to be £4 18/9 (GBP 4.9375) per troy ounce. The New York gold price was US$19.39. The first few fixings were conducted by telephone until the members started meeting at the Rothschild offices in New Court, St Swithin's Lane.

In 1933, Executive Order 6102 was signed by U.S. President Franklin D. Roosevelt, requiring US citizens to turn in their gold for $20.67 per ounce. Afterwards, the price of gold was set at $35.00 per ounce.

Due to wartime emergencies and government controls, the London gold fixing was suspended between 1939 and 1954, when the London gold market was closed.

On 21 January 1980 the gold fixing reached the price of $850, a figure not surpassed until 3 January 2008 when a new record of $865.35 per troy ounce was set in the a.m. fixing. However, when indexed for inflation, the 1980 high corresponds to a price of $2,305.18 in 2011 dollars, thus the 1980 record still holds in real terms.

The fixing historically took place at the London offices of N M Rothschild & Sons in St Swithin's Lane, but since 5 May 2004 it takes place by a dedicated telephone conferencing system. This was necessary as some banks moved their London operations away from the Bank of England towards areas such as Canary Wharf. Until 1968, the price was fixed only once a day, when a second fixing was introduced at 3 p.m. to coincide with the opening of the US markets, as the price of gold was no longer under control of the Bank of England, a result of the collapse of the London Gold Pool.

In April 2004, N.M. Rothschild & Sons announced that it planned to withdraw from gold trading and from the London gold fixing. Barclays Capital took its place on 7 June 2004 and the chairmanship of the meeting, formerly held permanently by Rothschilds, now rotates annually.

On 28 June 2012, an employee of Barclays manipulated the gold fixing process to prevent a derivative product previously sold to a client from leading to a payout. The employee, and subsequently Barclays, self-reported the incident.

In January 2014, Deutsche Bank withdrew from the panels setting the gold and silver fixings.

On 23 May 2014 the Financial Conduct Authority announced it had fined Barclays £26 million for systems and controls failures, and conflict of interest in relation to the gold fixing over the nine years to 2013, and for manipulation of the gold price on 28 June 2012.

== Process ==
The five participating banks are market makers. They may have gold orders on their own behalf (proprietary trading), their clients' behalf (brokerage), or frequently some of each. A sell limit order is not executed unless the price is above a preset value. A buy limit order is not executed unless the price is below a preset value.

The lead participant will begin the fixing process by proposing a price near the current gold spot price. The participants then simulate the result of trading at that price. The simulations do not merely factor physical gold, but include gold trading contracts ("Paper Gold") which are marginally backed and which therefore inflate market volumes and alter the supply/demand valuation formulas that would otherwise apply to the physical gold commodity.

First, each bank looks at its limit orders and determines how many are eligible to trade at that price. They can also consider how much gold their proprietary trading desk would trade at the same price. The bank then states a single value, the net amount (in ounces) of gold they wish to buy or sell. After each bank provides this value, they determine if the overall net amount is zero. If so, all transactions succeed and the fix is complete. The chair then states, "There are no flags, and we're fixed."

Otherwise, the chair must change the proposed price. If the amount of gold the banks proposed to buy is higher than the amount proposed for sale, he must raise the price. That will decrease the number of proposed purchases, both because more buy limit orders will fail and because of proprietary traders. At the same time, it increases the number of proposed sales, both because more sell limit orders succeed and because of proprietary trading.

Conversely, if the amount proposed for sale is higher, he must lower the price. This will have the exact opposite effects from above, increasing the number of proposed purchases and decreasing the number of proposed sales.

This process iterates until a fix is found. Buyers are charged 20 cents per troy ounce as a premium to fund the fix process; this results in an implicit bid–ask spread.

As with other forms of market making, participants attempt to predict the direction of the market and increase profits through timing.

Participants can pause proceedings at will. Originally, it was done by raising a small Union Jack on their desk. Under the telephone fixing system, participants can register a pause by saying the word "flag."

== See also ==
- Gold standard
- Gold as an investment
