= Rothschild & Co =

French-British investment bank

Rothschild & Co SCA
- Type: SCA (under Rothschild family control)
- Industry: Financial services
- Predecessors: N M Rothschild & Sons; Rothschild & Cie Banque
- Founded: 1811; 215 years ago (as N M Rothschild & Sons)
- Headquarters: Paris, France; New Court, London, England
- Area served: Worldwide
- Key people: David René de Rothschild (honorary chairman); Marc-Olivier Laurent (chairman of the Supervisory Board); Éric de Rothschild (Vice-chairman of the Supervisory Board); Alexandre de Rothschild (Executive Chairman)
- Services: Investment banking; Corporate banking; Private equity; Asset management; Private banking
- Revenue: ▲€2,908.7 million (2024)
- Operating income: ▲€743.3 million (2024)
- Net income: ▲€596.8 million (2024)
- AUM: ▲€18,474.3 million (2024)
- Total assets: ▲€19,527.1 million (2024)
- Total equity: ▲€3,699.0 billion (2024)
- Subsidiaries: Rothschild Martin Maurel (France, Belgium, Monaco); Rothschild Bank (Global)
- Website: rothschildandco.com

Rothschild & Co SCA is a multinational private and alternative assets investor, headquartered in Paris, France, and London, England. It is the flagship of the Rothschild banking group controlled by the French and British branches of the Rothschild family.

The banking business of the firm covers investment banking, restructuring, corporate banking, private equity, asset management, and private banking. It is also known to serve as the advisor and lender to governments and major corporations. In addition, the firm has its own investment account in private equity.

Rothschild's financial advisory division is known to serve British nobility as well as the British royal family. Past chairman Sir Evelyn Robert de Rothschild was the personal financial advisor of Queen Elizabeth II, and she knighted him in 1989 for his services to banking and finance.

== History ==
Arms of the Rothschild family

Rothschild & Co is the result of a merger between the French and British houses of Rothschild, each with individual but intertwined histories.

=== British history (N M Rothschild & Sons) ===
==== Late 18th century ====
In the late 18th century and early 19th century, Mayer Amschel Rothschild (1744–1812) rose to become one of Europe's most powerful bankers in the Landgraviate of Hesse-Kassel in the Holy Roman Empire. In pursuit of expansion, he appointed his sons to start banking operations in the various capitals of Europe, including sending his third son, Nathan Mayer Rothschild (1777–1836), to England.

==== Early 19th century ====
Nathan Mayer Rothschild first settled in Manchester, where he established a business in finance and textile trading. He later moved to London, founding N M Rothschild & Sons in 1811 at New Court, which remains the location of Rothschild & Co's London headquarters today. Through this company, Nathan Mayer Rothschild made a fortune with his involvement in the bond market.

According to historian Niall Ferguson in 1999, "For most of the nineteenth century, N. M. Rothschild was part of the biggest bank in the world which dominated the international bond market. For a contemporary equivalent, one has to imagine a merger between Merrill Lynch, Morgan Stanley, JPMorgan Chase & Co. and probably Goldman Sachs too—as well, perhaps, as the International Monetary Fund, given the nineteenth-century Rothschild's role in stabilizing the finances of numerous governments."

During the early part of the 19th century, the Rothschild London bank took a leading part in managing and financing the subsidies that the British government transferred to its allies during the Napoleonic Wars. Through the creation of a network of agents, couriers and shippers, the bank was able to provide funds to the armies of the Duke of Wellington in Portugal and Spain. In 1818 the Rothschild bank arranged a £5 million loan to the Prussian government and the issuing of bonds for government loans. The providing of other innovative and complex financing for government projects formed a mainstay of the bank's business for the better part of the century. N M Rothschild & Sons' financial strength in the City of London became such that by 1825, the bank was able to supply enough coin to the Bank of England to enable it to avert a liquidity crisis.

While Rothschild did have some links to slavery, like most firms with global operations in the 19th century, the firm was instrumental in abolishing it by providing a £15m gilt issue necessary to pass the Slavery Abolition Act 1833. The money provided by Rothschild was used to pay slave owners compensation for their slaves and the gilt issue was only fully redeemed in 2015.

==== Late 19th century ====
Logo of N M Rothschild & Sons Ltd, the "Five Arrows", representing the five sons of Mayer Amschel Rothschild and their respective businesses

Nathan Mayer's eldest son, Lionel de Rothschild (1808–1879) succeeded him as head of the London branch. Under Lionel the bank financed the British government's 1875 purchase of a controlling interest in the Suez Canal. Lionel also began to invest in railways as his uncle James had been doing in France. In 1869, Lionel's son, Alfred de Rothschild (1842–1918), became a director of the Bank of England, a post he held for 20 years. Alfred was one of those who represented the British Government at the 1892 International Monetary Conference in Brussels.

The Rothschild bank funded Cecil Rhodes in the development of the British South Africa Company and Leopold de Rothschild (1845–1917) administered Rhodes's estate after his death in 1902 and helped to set up the Rhodes Scholarship scheme at Oxford University. In 1873 de Rothschild Frères (trans. "The Rothschild Brothers") of Paris and N M Rothschild & Sons of London joined with other investors to acquire the Spanish government's money-losing Rio Tinto copper mines. The new owners restructured the company and turned it into a profitable business. By 1905, the Rothschild interest in Rio Tinto amounted to more than 30%. In 1887, the French and English Rothschild banking houses loaned money to, and invested in, the De Beers diamond mines in South Africa, becoming its largest shareholders.

==== 20th century ====
The First World War marked a change of fortune and emphasis for Rothschild. After the War, the Rothschild banks began a steady transition towards advisory work and finance raising for commercial concerns, including the London Underground. In 1938, the Austrian Rothschilds’ interests were given to the Nazis, bringing to an end more than a century at the heart of Central European banking. In France and Austria, the family was scattered for the duration of the Second World War. After the war, the British and French banks committed themselves to further developing their new operation in the United States, which was eventually to become Rothschild Inc, and increased focus on mergers and acquisitions, asset management, and merchant-banking.

In the 20th century, Rothschild secured key advisory roles in some of the most important, complex and recognizable mergers and acquisitions. In the 1980s, Rothschild took a leading role in the international phenomenon of privatization. The company was involved from the beginning and developed a pioneering role which spread out to more than thirty countries worldwide. In recent years, Rothschild advised on nearly a thousand completed mergers and acquisitions with a cumulative value in excess of US$1 trillion. Rothschild also advised on some of the largest and most high-profile corporate restructurings around the world.

The bank decided to enter the securities market buying Smith Brothers, a stock jobber, in December 1983.

The price of gold was fixed for years, twice daily at 10:30 am and 3:00 pm, in a small room at Rothschild's New Court headquarters on St Swithin's Lane. The world's main bullion houses: Deutsche Bank, HSBC, Scotia-Mocatta and Société Générale used the agreed rate as a price benchmark for gold products and derivatives in the world's markets. The chairperson, traditionally appointed by the Rothschild bank, sat in the center, although the bank itself has largely withdrawn from trading. The five members of the London Bullion Association: Barclays Capital, Deutsche Bank, Scotiabank, HSBC and Société Générale, now conduct their twice-daily meetings over the telephone. The meetings were a tradition as great as the ringing of the bell at the New York Stock Exchange until 2004.

=== French history (Paris Orléans) ===
==== 19th century ====
The Compagnie du chemin de fer de Paris à Orléans was founded in 1838 as a railway company. After several takeovers and a merger with the Chemins de fer du Midi, it had about 11,000 km (6,800 mi) of track and was one of the major railway companies in France. In 1938, it was nationalised along with five other railway undertakings to form the national state railway company SNCF.

==== 20th century ====
Logo of Rothschild prior to 2015 rebranding

After the Second World War, the French branch of the Rothschild family took over the remains of Paris Orléans and transformed it into a holding company for its banking activities and corporate investments. These mainly included the Banque Rothschild (bank), the SGIM (property company), the SIACI (insurance), the Francarep (oil company) and the SGDBR (wineries), now Domaines Barons de Rothschild (DBR).

By 1980, the Paris business employed about 2,000 people and had an annual turnover of 26 billion francs ($5 billion in the currency rates of 1980).

The Socialist French government of François Mitterrand nationalized the Banque Rothschild and renamed it Compagnie Européenne de Banque in 1981. In 1983, David de Rothschild and Eric de Rothschild recapitalized the family's business just as their ancestors had done in the prior century under the name Paris Orléans, as it was banned from using the family name until 1986, at which time the firm was renamed Rothschild & Cie Banque.

=== Modern history and recent events ===
==== Anglo-French Rothschild merger ====
In 2003, the English (N M Rothschild & Sons) and French (Rothschild & Cie Banque) firms announced plans to merge under the leadership of David R. de Rothschild. Paris Orléans SCA became the flagship holding company of the family business of Rothschild. Although Paris Orléans is listed on the exchange, the family retains control of the firm. After the merger of the banking activities, Paris Orléans SCA became the sole owner Concordia BV, which controls Rothschilds Continuation Holdings AG, which controls the Rothschild Group's banking activities. By 2011, the firm had merged operations and was unified.

==== Recent history ====
Current Logo of Rothschild & Co (2015–)

In 2007, Rothschild formed joint venture Jardine Rothschild Asia Capital with Jardine Strategic, specializing in growth capital investments.

In 2010, the firm appointed the first non-family member chief executive officer, Nigel Higgins.

In 2011, the firm rebranded from "N M Rothschild & Sons" to "Rothschild & Co." The goal of this was to show "a new global positioning as the fulcrum of the Financial Market."

In 2015, the parent company Paris Orléans changed its name to Rothschild & Co to match the trade name of the business.

In 2017, Rothschild & Co acquired the family-controlled French private bank Martin Maurel. This merger united the businesses of two European financial families. After the acquisition, Rothschild & Co became the leading private bank in France.

In 2018, Rothschild & Co sold its trust services division (responsible for the creation and administration of trust structures) to Richard Martin, a long-time Rothschild executive for an undisclosed amount. This restructuring of Rothschild's Wealth Management practice allowed the firm to focus more on its private banking activities from the recent purchase and integration of Rothschild Martin Maurel.

In 2019, the firm acquired a stake in Redburn, a global financial services firm that provides research in various coverage sectors and brokerage execution services for traditional and algorithmic sales and trading.

In 2022, Wintrust announced a deal to acquire the U.S. asset management arm of Rothschild, which held around $8 billion in assets under management at the time.

In 2023, the Rothschild family announced its intention to take Rothschild & Co. private by repurchasing the shares listed on stock exchanges. The transaction values the firm at €3.7bn and would end several decades of the firm being publicly listed.

== Operations ==
Rothschild & Co has three primary businesses: Global Advisory (Investment Banking Division), Wealth and Asset Management, and Five Arrows (Alternative Assets Division).

=== Global Advisory (Investment Banking Division) ===
The banking business is structured as follows:

- Mergers and Acquisitions and Strategic Advisory
- Debt Advisory and Restructuring
- Equity Advisory and Capital Markets

Rothschild & Co is consistently in the top 10 global investment banks for mergers and acquisitions (M&A) advisory by Thomson Reuters by both number and size of deals. In 2018, as with previous years, the firm ranked 1st globally and 1st in Europe by number of completed M&A transactions.

=== Wealth and Asset Management ===
Rothschild & Co's wealth management practice stems on wealth preservation through generations, just as the Rothschild family has done for over two centuries. The words of Nathan Mayer Rothschild, one of Mayer Amschel Rothschild's sons and founder of Rothschild & Co still illustrate the service provided to clients:

"It takes a great deal of boldness and a great deal of caution to make a great fortune; and when you have got it, it requires ten times as much wit to keep it" –Nathan Mayer Rothschild

As at the end of 2024, Rothschild's Wealth and Asset Management division had a total of €124 billion in assets under management.

=== Five Arrows ===
Five Arrows is the alternative assets arm of Rothschild & Co, deploying the firm's capital alongside private and institutional investors. As at the end of 2024, Five Arrows manages assets of €28 billion across private equity and private credit strategies.

=== Vineyards ===
Historically, the Rothschild family has owned many Bordeaux vineyards since 1868. Les Domaines Barons de Rothschild (Lafite) and Champagne Barons de Rothschild are some of the wineries owned in part by Rothschild & Co.

== New Court headquarters ==
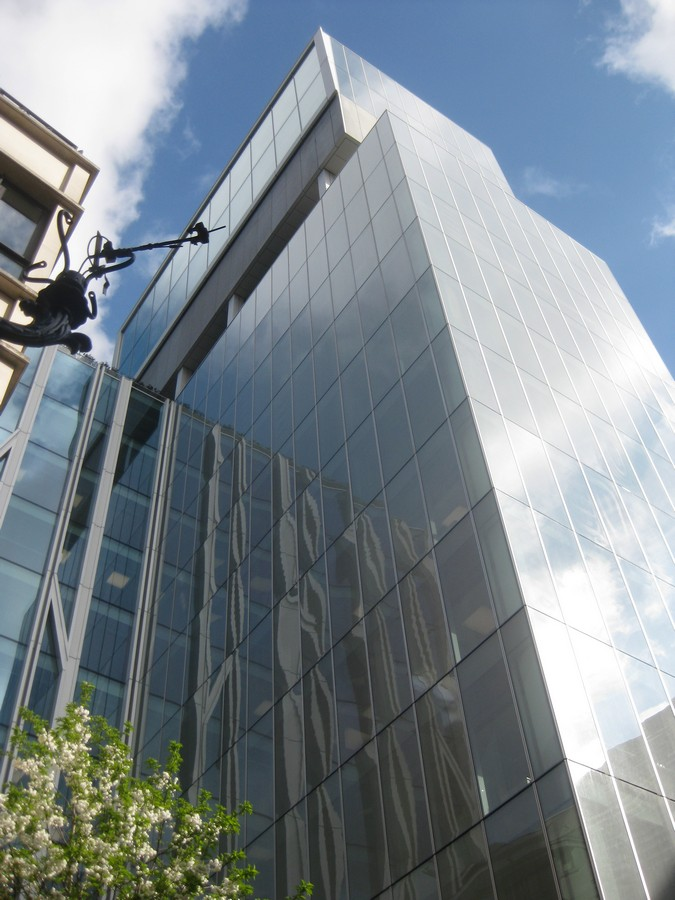
Fourth iteration of New Court

Rothschild & Co's headquarters in London have been continuously located at New Court, St. Swithin's Lane, London for over two centuries. After acquiring the lease in 1809, the firm continued to grow. In 1865, a new building designed by Thomas Marsh Nelson in the Italian "palazzo" style was created at the same site. This building served as the headquarters for Rothschild through both world wars. In 1962, the firm demolished and rebuilt its New Court headquarters for a third time at the suggestion of Evelyn Robert de Rothschild. In 2005, the firm decided to create a fourth iteration of the building that opens up views of St Stephen Walbrook church from its lobby, and views of the London skyline from a rooftop "sky pavilion" designed by Rem Koolhaas and his Office for Metropolitan Architecture (OMA).

== Controversies and legal issues ==
=== Jürg Heer scandal ===
Jürg Heer worked for Rothschild Bank AG (since October 2018 Rothschild & Co. Bank AG) in Zurich for more than twenty years, the last nine as its credit manager. He was dismissed in June 1992. Heer was accused of taking kickbacks of more than US$20 million in exchange for making unsecured and unapproved loans to the German-Canadian real estate magnate Karsten von Wersebe, resulting in a loss of US$155 million to the bank. In 1998, in the district court of Zurich, Heer confessed that he embezzled about US$33 million from Rothschild Bank AG between 1986 and 1992. The Rothschild family committed CHF 150 million to supporting its bank in recovering from one of the then largest financial frauds in Switzerland.

=== NM Rothschild & Sons Ltd vs. Rothschild & Co (UK) Ltd ===
On 27 January 2009 NM Rothschild & Sons Ltd filed under s.69(1)(b) of the UK Companies Act 2006 for a change of name of the respondent company, Rothschild & Co (UK) Ltd, which had been registered since 31 October 2008. The Company Names Tribunal found for the applicant and ordered the respondent to change its name or else have its name changed by the adjudicator, as well as to pay the applicant's costs.

=== Von Schönau-Riedweg vs. Rothschild Bank AG & others ===
On 20 December 2012 Rothschild Bank AG brought suit against its client Corinna von Schönau-Riedweg in Switzerland, seeking a declaration that the bank had no liability with respect to the private equity transactions recommended by Rothschild Bank's former employee Wilfrid von Plotho. As a reaction to this suit von Schönau brought suit in the Superior Court in Boston/USA against Rothschild Bank AG, Rothschild Trust (Schweiz) AG, Wilfrid von Plotho and others. In December 2014 a separate and final judgment over US$15 million against von Plotho and his Panamanian offshore company ARA Management was entered in force; neither von Plotho nor ARA Management appealed from that judgment. In June 2019 the Appeals Court of Massachusetts (Boston) decided that von Schönau's suit against Rothschild Bank should be revived, as she had made a showing that Wilfrid von Plotho, she claims caused her millions of dollars to lose, was Rothschild Bank's agent in Switzerland as well as in the USA.

=== Non-Prosecution Agreement with the U.S. Department of Justice ===
According to the Non-Prosecution Agreement with the U.S. Department of Justice (Tax Division) of June 2015, Rothschild Bank (now Rothschild & Co. Bank AG) admitted that it had 66 U.S.-related accounts held by entities created in Panama, Liechtenstein, British Virgin Islands or other foreign countries with U.S. beneficial owners. Knowing it was highly probable that the U.S. clients were engaging in schemes to avoid U.S. taxes, Rothschild Bank permitted the accounts to trade in U.S. securities without reporting account earnings, or transmitting any withholding taxes, to the IRS. Of the U.S. related accounts with an aggregate maximum balance of approximately US$836 million had U.S. beneficial owners, representing approx. 5% of the aggregate maximum balance of Rothschild Bank's total assets under management during the period in question. In recognition of its illegal conduct Rothschild Bank agreed to pay US$11,510,000 as a penalty to the U.S. Department of Justice without having to admit any guilt in the matter.

=== 1MDB Malaysian sovereign wealth fund scandal ===
Rothschild Bank AG (since October 2018 renamed Rothschild & Co. Bank AG), a subsidiary of Rothschild & Co, broke anti-money-laundering rules in 1MDB case according to Swiss prosecutiors. In July 2018 the Swiss Financial Market Authority (FINMA) concluded final 1MDB proceedings, in which Rothschild Bank AG and its subsidiary Rothschild Trust (Schweiz) AG have been found to be in serious breach of money laundering rules in the context of 1 MDB. The FINMA appointed an audit agent to review enhancements already put in place by Rothschild Bank. FINMA stated, that Rothschild Bank and Rothschild Trust were found to be in "breach of due diligence, reporting and documentation requirements […]. Although there were early indications that this client could be involved in money laundering activities, the institutions decided nevertheless to enter into the relationship and at a later stage considerably expand it." The 1MDB fraud saw billions of dollars siphoned off from the sovereign wealth fund into the pockets of corrupt officials.

=== Dispute between Rothschild & Co and Edmond de Rothschild Group ===
After Paris Orléans was renamed to Rothschild & Co, the Swiss-based Edmond de Rothschild Group disputed the use of the family name for branding purposes. Until their settlement, Rothschild & Co and the Edmond de Rothschild Group were cross-shareholders in each other's businesses, further complicating the matter. In 2018, the two sides of the family resolved the dispute.

=== Marjorie Taylor Greene "space laser" accusation ===
In January 2021, US Representative Marjorie Taylor Greene (R-GA) was reported to have made a Facebook post blaming "Rothschild, Inc" among others for using "space solar generators" to ignite the 2018 Camp Fire, one of California's deadliest and most destructive wildfires.

== Notable current and former employees ==
Many notable people, including heads of state, CEOs, and billionaires have been involved with the firm. This partial list excludes the many notable members of the Rothschild family who have worked at the family firm.

=== Business ===
- René-Pierre Azria – Director of Jarden Corporation; managing director of Blackstone Indosuez
- Claude Arpels – heir to Van Cleef & Arpels
- Dominic Barton – Worldwide managing director of McKinsey & Company
- Franco Bernabè – CEO of Telecom Italia
- Michel de Carvalho – vice-chairman of investment banking of Citigroup; director of Heineken International
- José María Castellano – CEO of Inditex Group
- Sir John Collins – CEO of Shell UK; chairman of National Power
- Alfonso Cortina – chairman and CEO of Repsol
- Douglas Daft – chairman and CEO of The Coca-Cola Company; director of The McGraw-Hill Companies
- Dudley Eustace – Chairman of The Nielsen Company, vice-chairman of Royal Philips Electronics
- Pehr G. Gyllenhammar – Chairman of Aviva; founder of European Round Table of Industrialists
- Jay Hambro – CIO of Petropavlovsk plc; CEO of Aricom
- Sir Graham Hearne – deputy chairman of Gallaher Group; chairman and CEO of Enterprise Oil
- Nigel Higgins – Chairman of Barclays Bank
- Henry Keswick – Chairman of Jardine Matheson Holdings; director of Mandarin Oriental
- James Lawrence – Chairman of L.E.K. Consulting; CFO of Unilever
- Lord Leach of Fairford – Director of Jardine Matheson Holdings; Chairman of Open Europe
- Sir Carl Meyer – Deputy chairman of De Beers; governor of the National Bank of Egypt
- Baron Moser – Chairman of British Museum; Chairman Economist Intelligence Unit
- Paul Myners – Chairman of Guardian Media Group; Chairman of Marks & Spencer
- Jonathan Oppenheimer – Director of E. Oppenheimer & Son Ltd.
- Robert S. Pirie – Senior Managing Director of Bear Stearns & Co.
- Gerald Rosenfeld – Head of Investment Banking of Lazard
- Wilbur Ross – investor, billionaire, and former United States Secretary of Commerce
- Trevor C. Rowe – Director of the Australian Securities Exchange; chairman of United Group; chairman of Queensland Investment Corporation (QIC)
- Anthony Salz – Senior partner of Freshfields Bruckhaus Deringer; acting chairman of Board of Governors of the BBC
- Peter Smith – Chairman of Coopers & Lybrand; Chairman of Savills
- Baron Vallance of Tummel – vice-chairman of Royal Bank of Scotland; Chairman of British Telecom
- Jeremy Weir – CEO of Trafigura
- Sian Westerman – Co-chair of the BFC Fashion Trust and trustee of the Royal Academy Trust

=== Politics and public service ===
- Thierry Breton – French Minister of Economy, Finance and Industry (2005–2007)
- Gerhard Schröder – Chancellor of Germany (1998–2005)
- Liam Byrne – Minister of State at the Home Office (2006–2010); Minister of State at Her Majesty's Treasury (2008–2010)
- Baron George – Governor of the Bank of England (1993–2003)
- John Kingman – Chief executive of UK Financial Investments
- Baron Lamont – Member of the British Parliament (1972–1997); Chancellor of the Exchequer(1990–93)
- Anthony Nelson – Member of the British Parliament (1974–1997); Economic Secretary to the Treasury(1992–94)
- Sir Edwin Leather – Member of the British Parliament (1950–1964); Governor of Bermuda (1973–1977)
- Oliver Letwin – Chairman of the Conservative Research Department; Minister of State for Policy
- Emmanuel Macron – President of France and Co-Prince of Andorra (2017–present)
- René Mayer – Prime Minister of France (1953)
- Baron Neuberger of Abbotsbury – Lord of Appeal in Ordinary (2007–2017)
- Georges Pompidou – Prime Minister of France (1962–1968); President of the French Republic and Co-Prince of Andorra (1969–1974)
- John Redwood – Member of the British Parliament (1987–2024)
- Jacob Rees-Mogg – Member of the British Parliament (2010–2024)
- Felix Rohatyn – United States Ambassador to France (1997–2000)
- Goh Keng Swee – Deputy Prime Minister of Singapore (1973–1984); Minister of Finance of Singapore (1959–1965;1967–1970)
- Baron Wakeham – Leader of the House of Lords (1992–1994); Leader of the House of Commons (1987–1989)
- John Whittingdale – British Politician

=== Armed forces ===
- Field Marshal Baron Guthrie of Craigiebank – Chief of the General Staff (1994–1997); Chief of the Defence Staff (1997–2001)

== See also ==
- Rothschild banking family of England
- Rothschild banking family of France
- List of banks in the euro area
- List of banks in France
- List of banks in the United Kingdom
