= ScotiaMocatta =

Bank subsidiary in Canada

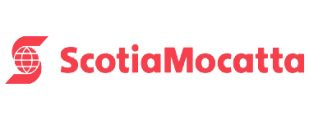
- Formerly: Mocatta Bullion; Mocatta & Goldsmid; Mocatta Group
- Type: Subsidiary
- Founded: 1684
- Founder: Moses Mocatta
- Defunct: 2019
- Parent: Scotiabank
- Website: scotiamocatta.com

ScotiaMocatta, originally founded as Mocatta Bullion in 1684, was a precious metal and base metal trading company that operated as the metals trading division of the Bank of Nova Scotia (Scotiabank) from 1997 until January 2019.

== Business ==
ScotiaMocatta was one of the ten market-making members of the London Bullion Market Association. They were participants in the London gold fixing. Their organization had a history of 340 years, and was the only original member of the London Gold and Silver fixes to maintain seats in both associations. After the dissolution of ScotiaMocatta, Scotiabank holds those memberships.

== History ==
ScotiaMocatta was formed by Scotiabank's acquisition of Mocatta Bullion from Standard Chartered Bank in 1997. They acquired it from Hambros Bank in 1973.

The company dates back to Moses Mocatta, who immigrated from Amsterdam to London where, in 1671, he established a shop for gold, silver, and diamonds, then opened an account with the English goldsmith-banker Edward Backwell (ca. 1618–1683). Moses Mocatta sent silver to India in 1676, because silver was cheaper in London than in Bombay or Shanghai. 1684, the bullion dealer and refiner ″Mocatta″ was developed to serve as a broker to the Bank of England and the East India Company in the 18th and 19th centuries. The business was re-named ″Mocatta & Goldsmid″ in 1799 after Asher Goldsmid was admitted as partner in 1787.

The firm was solely controlled by the Mocatta and Goldsmid families for 286 years before they merged with Hambros Bank in 1957. Subsequent to 1957, the firm was managed by Edward Mocatta, with involvement and shareholdings variously from Hambros Bank, Standard Chartered Bank, Henry Jarecki, Scotiabank, the Mocatta family, and vaguely defined 'others'. With Peter Hambro as Deputy Managing Director and Henry Jarecki as Chairman, the firm dealt in options and other financial contracts in precious metals and pursued bullion exchanges in Russia, the United States, South America, Switzerland, Mexico, Germany, China, Hungary, Australia, Japan, and South Africa, and became the largest gold and silver counter-party to the Soviet Union.

The Mocatta firm acts as central bankers, notably the Bank of England and the United States Treasury in market stabilisations, notably the 1913 run on the Indian Specie Bank, and the 1980 attempt by the Hunt brothers to corner the silver market.

Starting in 1986, the Luxemburg Monetary Institute issues gold coins through a Luxemburg subsidiary The Luxemburg Mint. One of their shareholders is the Mocatta group.

As of 2018, ScotiaMocatta maintained offices in Toronto, New York City, London, Mumbai, New Delhi, Bangalore, Shanghai, Hong Kong, and Singapore.

=== Closure ===
2018, the managing bankers controlled the activities of 160 employees in ten offices.

On 18 October 2017, The Financial Times of London reported because ScotiaMocatta was an instrumental lender to Elemetal or their subsidiaries, one of whose gold refinery subsidiaries was corrupted by Peruvian narco-traffickers and thus laundered about US$3.6 billion dollars, the managing bankers attempted to sell the business through the intermediation of JPMorgan.

The gold price-fixing scandal and lawsuits of 2016 were also deemed responsible for Scotiabank's review of ScotiaMocatta. Two of the managing bankers of ScotiaMocatta parted ways with Scotiabank in May 2018, after Scotiabank, with JPMorgan to facilitating the sale, failed to find a buyer. By June 2018, the parent reduced the money available to ScotiaMocatta for external loans, at the time numbered at US$8bn. The managing bankers terminated relationships with stand-alone clients. Another senior staff member left his employment in mid-May, while another six traders were given notice. In September 2018, the Bank of Montreal hired six traders away from the failure.

As a result of the January 2019 re-organization, Scotiabank stopped supplying gold to the Italian and Indian jewelry industries. Impetus for the change came from the departure of seven New York-based traders to a Canadian rival, Bank of Montreal.

At the end of April 2020, the Financial Post reported that Scotiabank bankers were planning to withdraw from their remaining metals trade, including the trade with precious metals, and to wind down their existing activities in this field until the beginning of 2021.

== See also ==
- Gold as an investment
- Mocatta (name)
- Mocatta family

== Sources ==
- Niss, Jason (17 October 2004). "Peter Hambro: He's never been to Harrow, he can carve a ham and he's struck gold in Russia". The Independent on Sunday.
- "Scotia-Mocatta". goldavenue.com.
- Green, Timothy (1984). Precious Heritage: 300 Years of Mocatta and Goldsmid. London: Rosendale Press. ISBN 0950918202.
