= Château Lafite Rothschild =

French wine estate of Bordeaux wine

Coordinates: 45°13′30″N 0°46′23″W

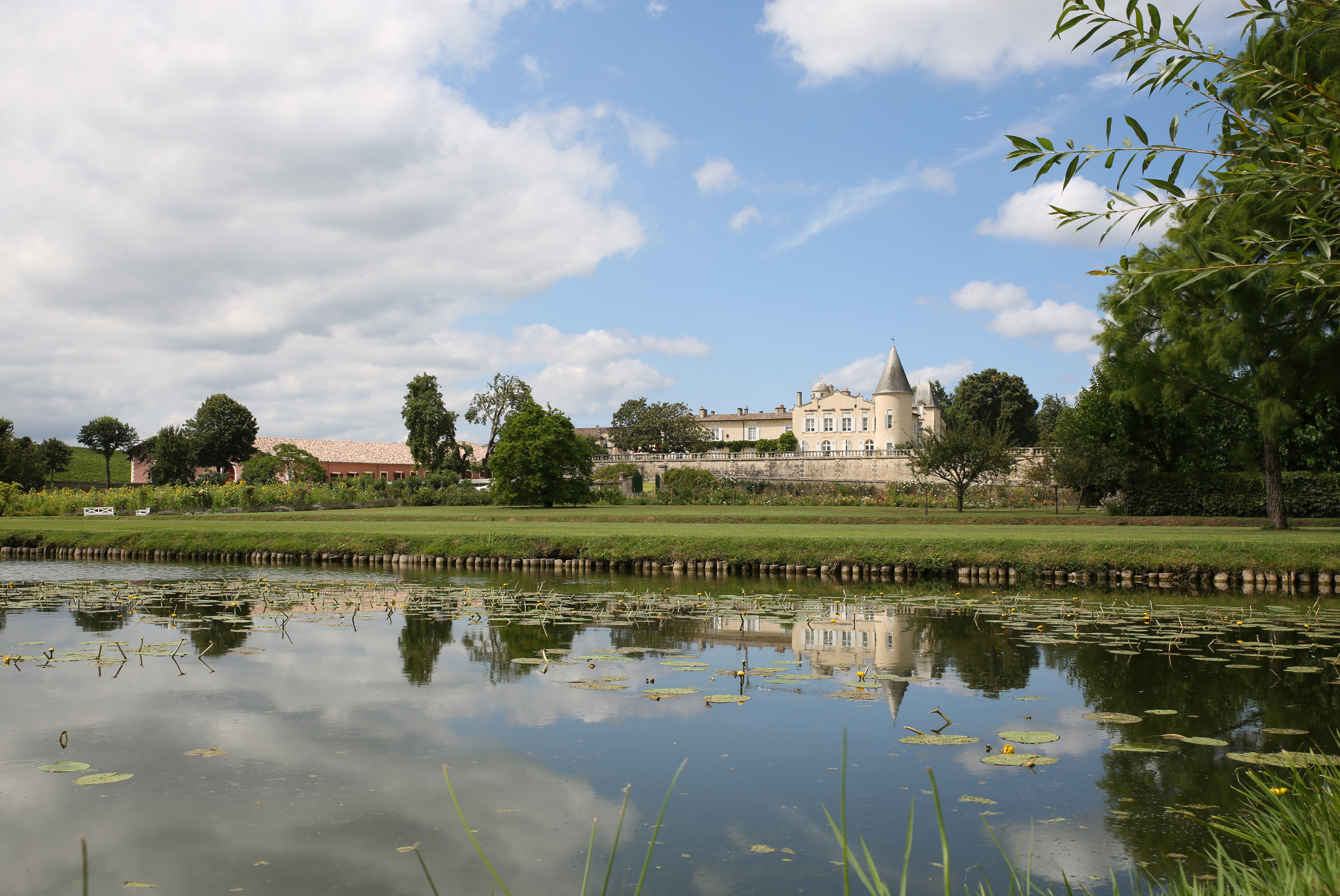
Château Lafite Rothschild in Pauillac, Médoc region

Château Lafite Rothschild is a French wine estate of Bordeaux wine, located in Pauillac in France, owned by members of the Rothschild family since the 19th century, and rated as a First Growth under the 1855 Bordeaux Classification.

Lafite was one of four wine-producing châteaux of Bordeaux originally awarded First Growth ('Premier Cru') status in the 1855 Classification (Chateau Mouton Rothschild was upgraded in 1973 to become the fifth). Since then, it has been a consistent producer of one of the world's most expensive red wines. A bottle of 1869 Château Lafite Rothschild held the world record for the most expensive bottle of wine sold at auction for $233,973 in 2010.

== History ==
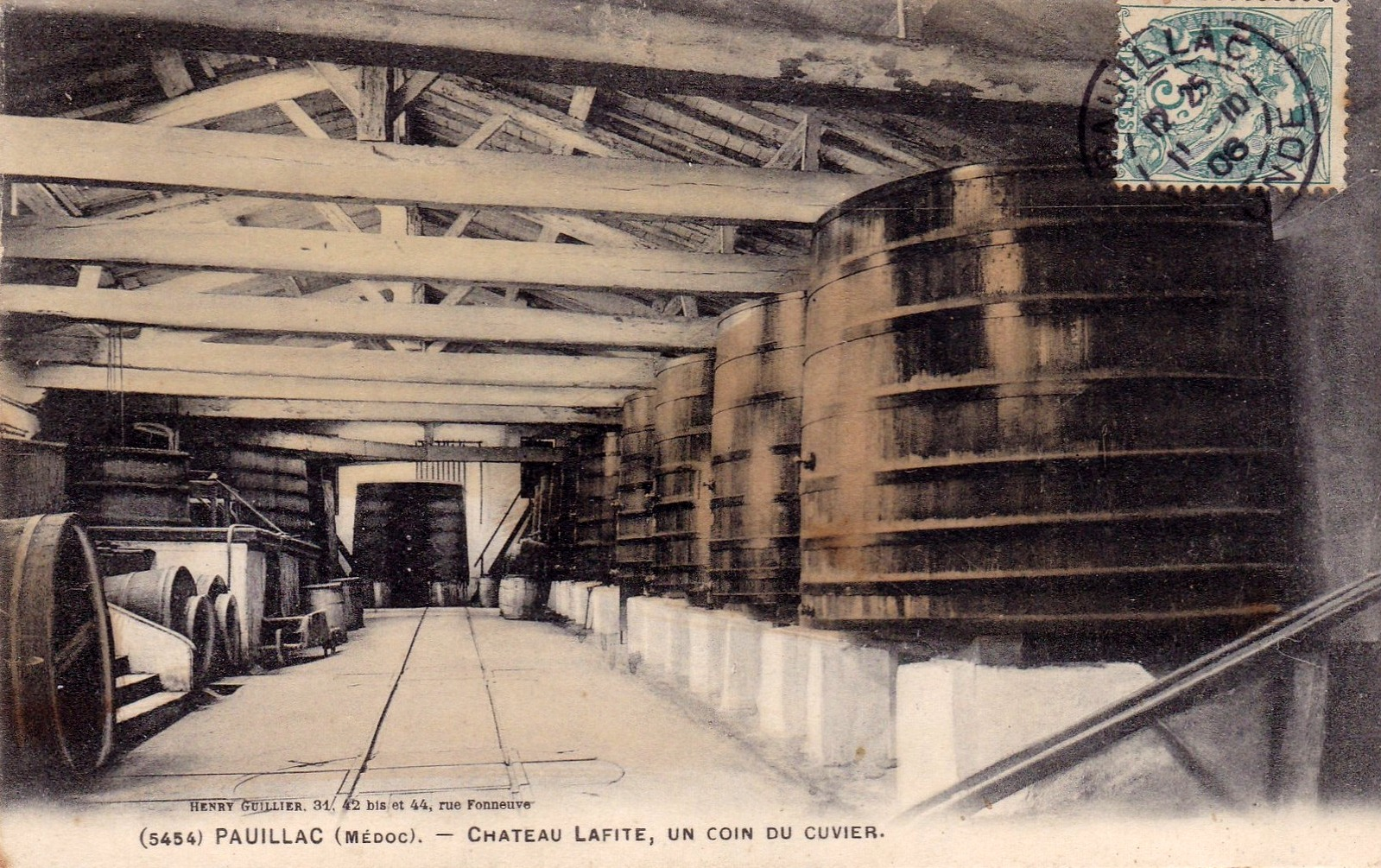
Historical postcard showing the cellar with large vats for wine

Situated in the wine-producing village of Pauillac in the Médoc region to the north-west of Bordeaux, the estate was the property of Gombaud de Lafite in 1234. In the 17th century, the property of Château Lafite was purchased by the Ségur family, including the 16th century manor house that still stands. Although vines almost certainly already existed on the site, around 1680, Jacques de Ségur planted the majority of the vineyard.

In the early 18th century, Nicolas-Alexandre, marquis de Ségur refined the wine-making techniques of the estate, and introduced his wines to the upper echelons of European society. Before long he was known as the "Wine Prince", and the wine of Château Lafite called "The King's Wine" thanks to the influential support of the Maréchal de Richelieu. Towards the end of the 18th century, Lafite's reputation was assured and even Thomas Jefferson visited the estate and became a lifelong customer.

Following the French Revolution, the period known as Reign of Terror led to the execution of Nicolas Pierre de Pichard on 30 June 1794, bringing an end to the Ségur family's ownership of the estate which became public property. In 1797 the vineyards were sold to a group of Dutch merchants.

The first half of the 19th century saw Lafite in the hands of the Vanlerberghe family and the wine improved more, including the great vintages of 1795, 1798 and 1818. In 1868 the Château was purchased by Baron James Mayer Rothschild for 4.4 million francs, and the estate became Château Lafite Rothschild. Rothschild, however, died just three months after purchasing Lafite. The estate then became the joint property of his three sons: Alphonse, Gustave and Edmond Rothschild.

The 20th century has seen periods of success and difficulty, coping with post-phylloxera vines, and two world wars. During the Second World War the Château was occupied by the German army, and suffered heavily from plundering of its cellars. Succeeding his uncle Élie de Rothschild, Lafite has been under the direction of Éric de Rothschild from 1974 to 2018, when he was succeeded by his daughter, Saskia de Rothschild. She is the youngest woman leading a Premier Grand Cru Bordeaux estate.

At the 5 December 1985 Christie's auction, a new record price of approximately US$156,000 was paid for a bottle of wine – a 1787 Château Lafite which was thought to be owned by Thomas Jefferson. The authenticity of the bottle has been challenged. On 29 October 2010, the record was broken at a Sotheby's auction in Hong Kong – three bottles of 1869 Chateau Lafite-Rothschild were sold for HK$1.8M (US$232,692) each.

== Counterfeiting ==
In early November 2012, police in the city of Wenzhou, China, seized nearly 10,000 bottles of suspected counterfeit Château Lafite Rothschild. Lafite is very popular among China's nouveau riche, but analysts suspect that between 50 and 70 per cent of wine labeled "Château Lafite Rothschild" in China is fake. If genuine, the collection seized in Wenzhou would have been worth up to US$16 million.

== Vineyard ==
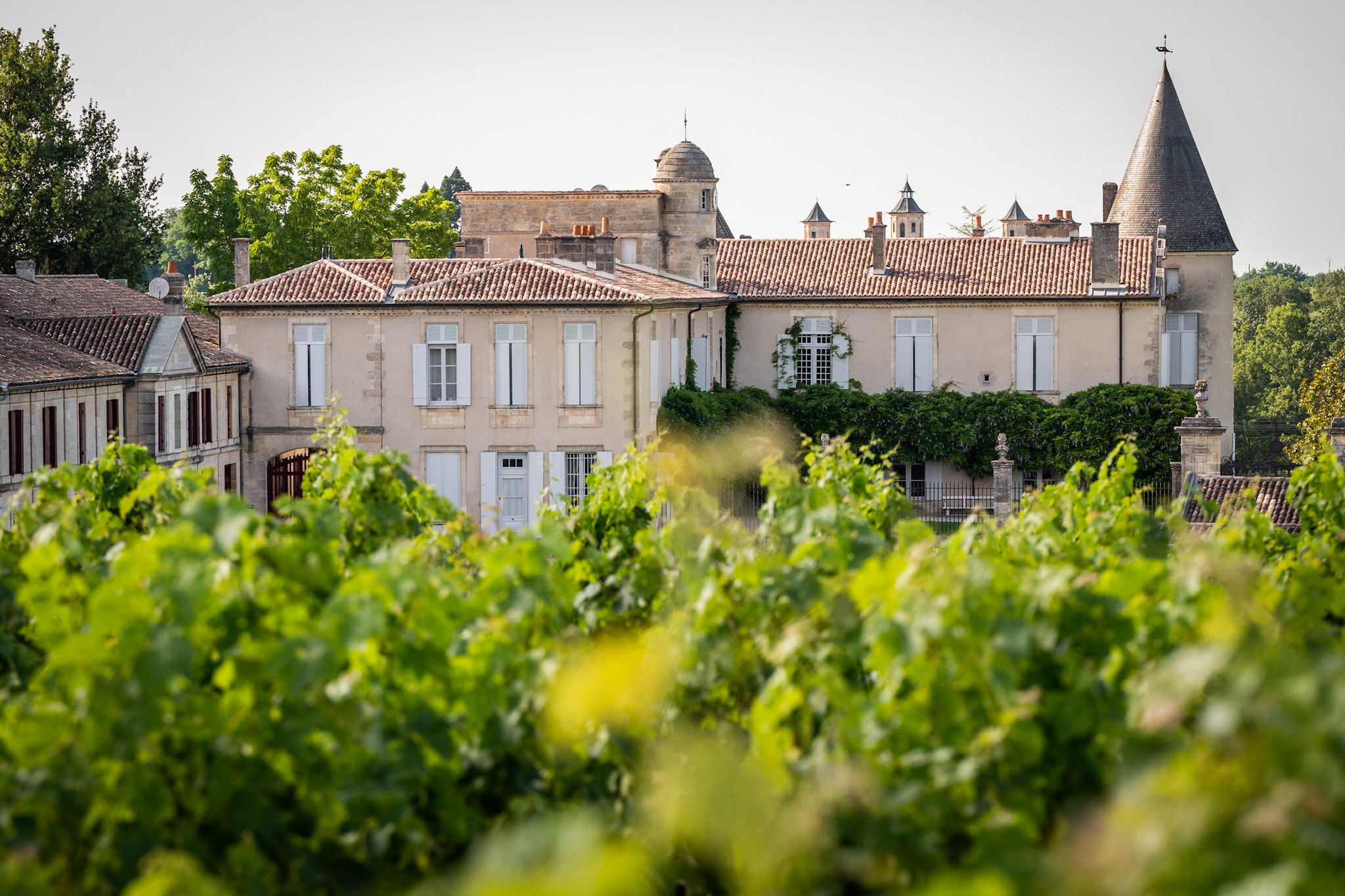
View towards the château from the vineyard

The vineyard is one of the largest in the Médoc at 107 hectares, and produces around 35,000 cases annually, of which between 15,000 and 25,000 are first growth. Its vines are around 70% Cabernet Sauvignon, 25% Merlot, 3% Cabernet Franc, and 2% Petit Verdot, whereas the final wine is between 80% and 95% Cabernet Sauvignon, 5% and 20% Merlot, and up to 3% Cabernet Franc and Petit Verdot. Occasionally exceptions are made, such as the 1961 vintage which was 100% Cabernet Sauvignon.

A second Château Lafite Rothschild vineyard was established in the Chinese province of Shandong, where 250,000 vine stocks from France are planted on 30 hectares. Its vines are Cabernet Sauvignon, Cabernet Franc and Marselan. In 2019, the estate debuted its first vintage from its Domaine de Long Dai winery in Shandong.

== Wines ==
In addition to the first growth, around a third of the wine is released as a second wine under the label Carruades de Lafite.

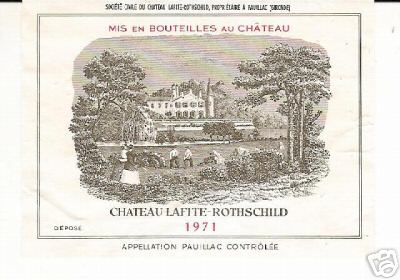
Château Lafite Rothschild wine label from the 1971 vintage

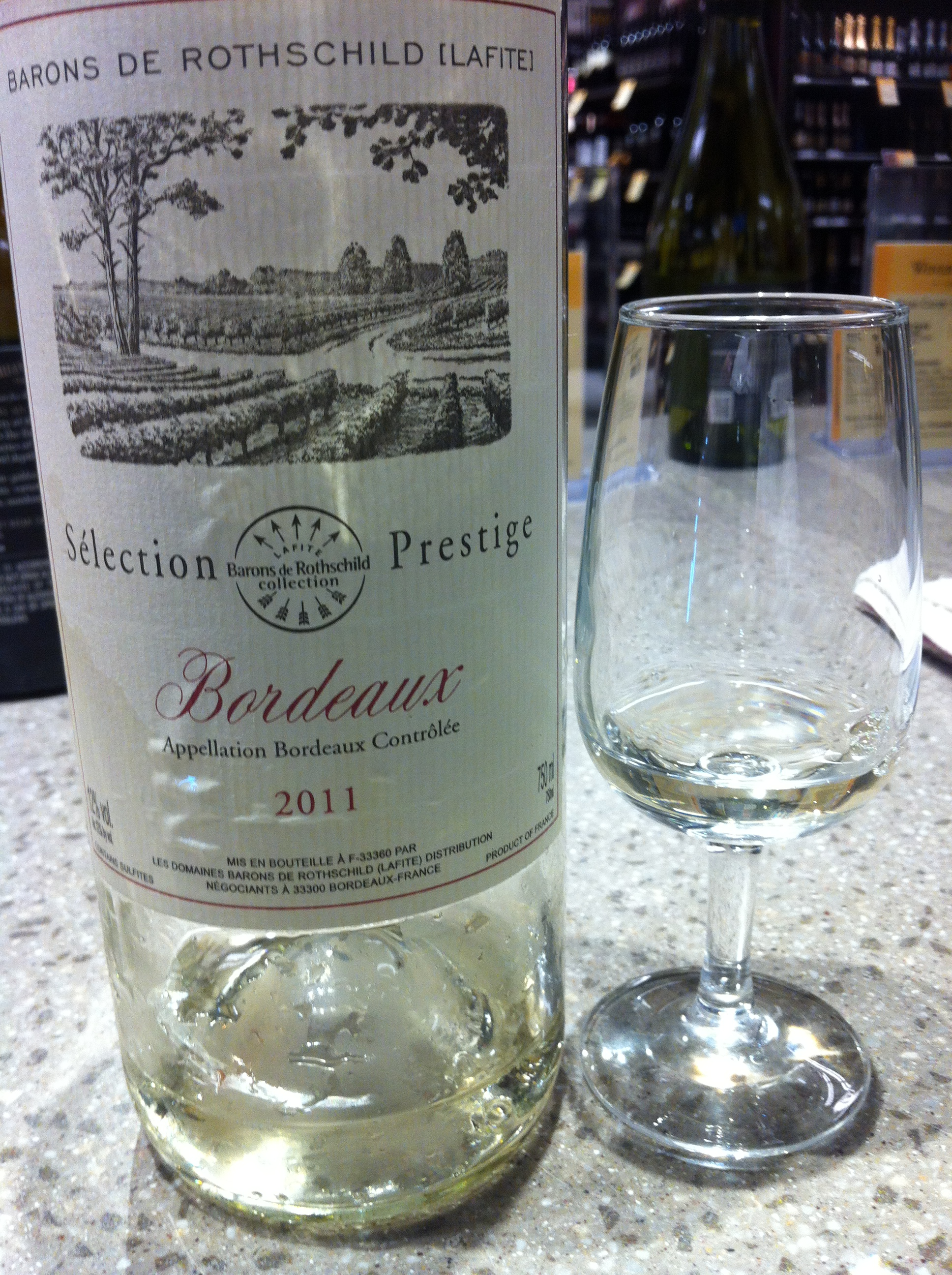
A dry white Bordeaux from one of the many second labels of the Lafite Rothschild family

Chateau Lafite Rothschild 1979

== Price ==
Across all vintages, Lafite Rothschild is one of the most expensive wines in the world, with the average price per 750 ml bottle reaching $911. Prices for Carruades de Lafite rose dramatically due in part to Chinese demand, with the prices of its 2005 and 2000 vintage fetching over £10,000 per case. After peaking in 2011, however, the price of some vintages halved in two years.

== See also ==
- Bordeaux wine
- French wine
- Château Mouton Rothschild
- Domaine de la Romanée-Conti
