= 703 Noëmi =

Main-belt asteroid

Discovery
- Discovered by: J. Palisa
- Discovery site: Vienna Obs.
- Discovery date: 3 October 1910

Designations
- Named after: Valentine Noémi von Springer (née von Rothschild; daughter of Baron Rothschild)
- Alternative designations: 1910 KT
- Minor planet category: main-belt · Flora

Orbital characteristics
- Epoch 4 September 2017 (JD 2458000.5)
- Uncertainty parameter 0
- Observation arc: 106.48 yr (38,891 days)
- Aphelion: 2.4744 AU
- Perihelion: 1.8748 AU
- Semi-major axis: 2.1746 AU
- Eccentricity: 0.1379
- Orbital period (sidereal): 3.21 yr (1,171 days)
- Mean anomaly: 107.58°
- Mean motion: 0° 18^{m} 26.28^{s} / day
- Inclination: 2.4579°
- Longitude of ascending node: 213.77°
- Argument of perihelion: 174.50°

Physical characteristics
- Dimensions: 7.250±0.273 km 8.58 km (calculated); 9.85±1.42 km
- Synodic rotation period: 201.8±2.0 h (Note: Noschese (2017) web: rotation period 201.8±2.0 hours with a brightness amplitude of 0.8 mag. Summary figures for (703) Noëmi at Collaborative Asteroid Lightcurve Link (CALL))
- Geometric albedo: 0.19±0.10; 0.24 (assumed); 0.368±0.046; 0.486±0.071
- Spectral type: S
- Absolute magnitude (H): 12.10 · 12.33±0.24 · 12.40 · 12.5 · 12.70

703 Noëmi, provisional designation 1910 KT, is a stony Florian asteroid and possible slow rotator from the inner regions of the asteroid belt, approximately 8.5 kilometers in diameter. It was discovered by Austrian astronomer Johann Palisa at the Vienna Observatory on 3 October 1910. The asteroid was likely named for Baroness Valentine Noémi von Springer (née von Rothschild; 1886–1968).

== Orbit and classification ==
Noëmi is a member of the Flora family, the 3rd largest main-belt asteroid family with nearly 14,000 known members.

This asteroid orbits the Sun in the inner main-belt at a distance of 1.9–2.5 AU once every 3 years and 3 months (1,171 days). Its orbit has an eccentricity of 0.14 and an inclination of 2° with respect to the ecliptic. The body's observation arc begins at Vienna, 3 days after its official discovery observation.

== Physical characteristics ==
Noëmi has been characterized as a common stony S-type asteroid based on its classification to the Flora family.

=== Lightcurves ===
In December 2016, a rotational lightcurve of Noëmi was obtained from photometric observations. Lightcurve analysis gave a rotation period of 201.8±2.0 hours with a brightness variation of 0.8 magnitude (U=n.a.), superseding a previous inconclusive observation by French amateur astronomer Pierre Antonini from February 2011.

The lightcurve's large amplitude of 0.8 magnitude is typically indicative of a non-spheroidal shape (an elongated, irregular shape). As of July 2017, the asteroid is only a possible slow rotator as the lightcurve's quality has not been rated.

=== Diameter and albedo ===
According to the surveys carried out by the Japanese Akari satellite and the NEOWISE mission of NASA's Wide-field Infrared Survey Explorer, Noëmi measures between 7.250 and 9.85 kilometers in diameter and its surface has an albedo between 0.19 and 0.486.

The Collaborative Asteroid Lightcurve Link assumes an albedo of 0.24 – derived from 8 Flora, the largest member and namesake of its family – and calculates a diameter of 8.58 kilometers based on an absolute magnitude of 12.5.

== Naming ==
According to A. Schnell, this minor planet was probably named for Baroness Valentine Noémi von Rothschild (1886–1969) to celebrate her engagement to Baron Sigismund von Springer (1873–1927). Baroness von Springer was the only daughter of Baron Albert von Rothschild, a banker, steam-railway pioneer, philanthropist, and astronomy enthusiast who had recently donated a stereocomparator to the Vienna Observatory and who, in 1885, had given the observatory 10,000 florins for purchase of its coudé-focus equatorial telescope. The baroness's property was "Aryanized" during the 1938 Anschluss. Baroness von Springer's niece, Baroness Bettina – named after Baroness Valentine Noémi de Rothschild's mother, Bettina – was mentioned in 1998 news stories, when Austria passed a law returning to Rothschild heirs such treasures as remained in Austrian museums.

The naming of Noemi was published in Sirius journal in 1911 and in Astronomische Nachrichten in 1912 (AN 190).

== See also ==
- 250 Bettina
- 719 Albert
