= Nathaniel Mayer von Rothschild =

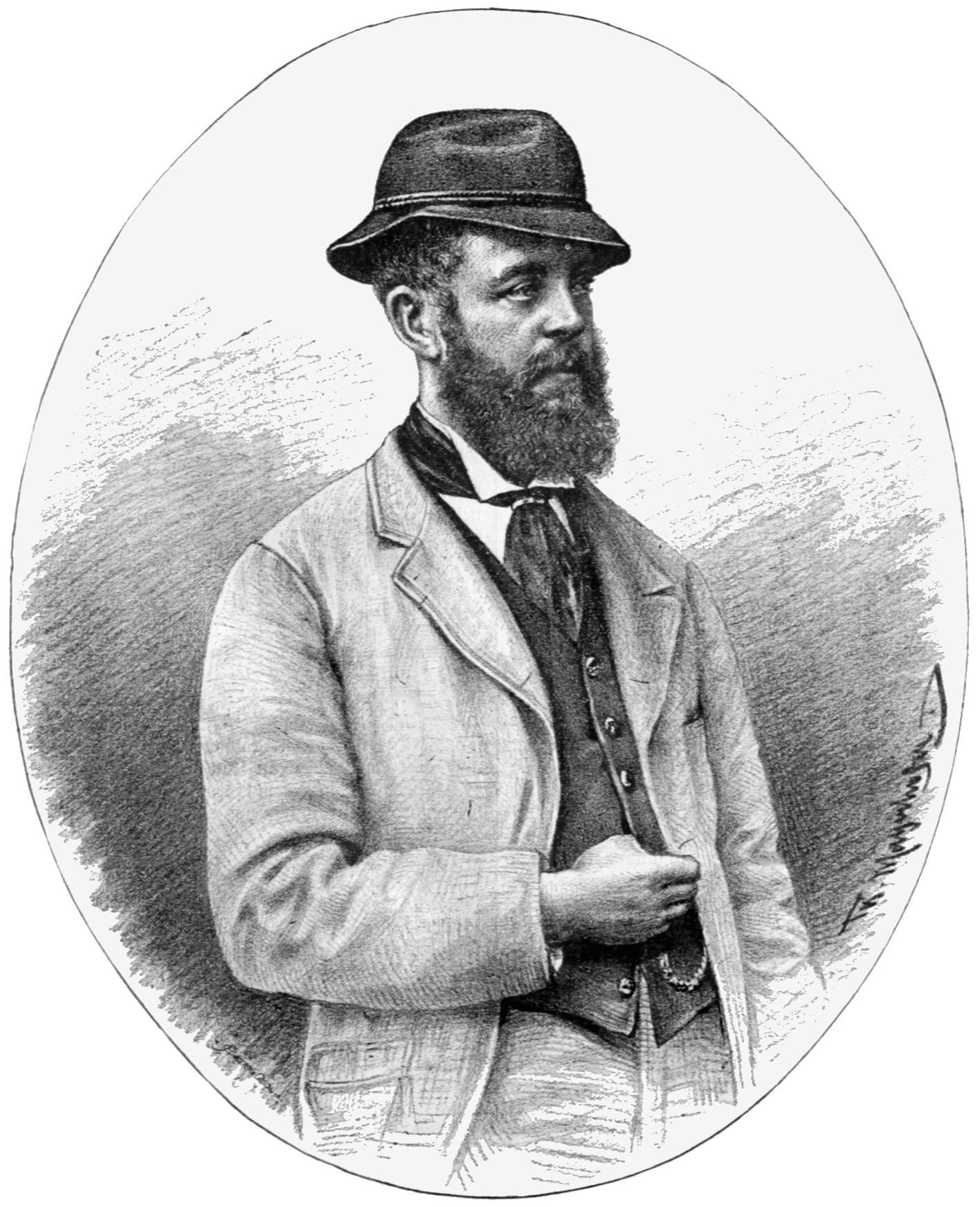
- Baron Nathaniel Rothschild (Theodor Mayerhofer, 1884)
- Born: 26 October 1836; Vienna, Austrian Empire
- Died: 16 June 1905 (aged 68); Vienna, Austria-Hungary
- Occupation: Art collector

Nathaniel Mayer von Rothschild (26 October 1836 – 16 June 1905) was a member of the Rothschild banking family of Austria, known as art collector and patron.

== Life ==
Born in Vienna, he was the fifth child and first son of Anselm von Rothschild (1803–1874) and his wife Charlotte von Rothschild (1807–1859). His grandfather Salomon Mayer von Rothschild (1774–1855), a native from Frankfurt, had founded the Viennese S M von Rothschild banking house in 1820, continued as the Creditanstalt by his father.

Nathaniel as the eldest male was expected to take over the running of the family's Austrian banking business. He studied at Brünn but fell out of favour with his father who considered him extravagant and financially irresponsible. Rather than going into business, Nathaniel spent his life as a socialite who built mansions and collected works of art.

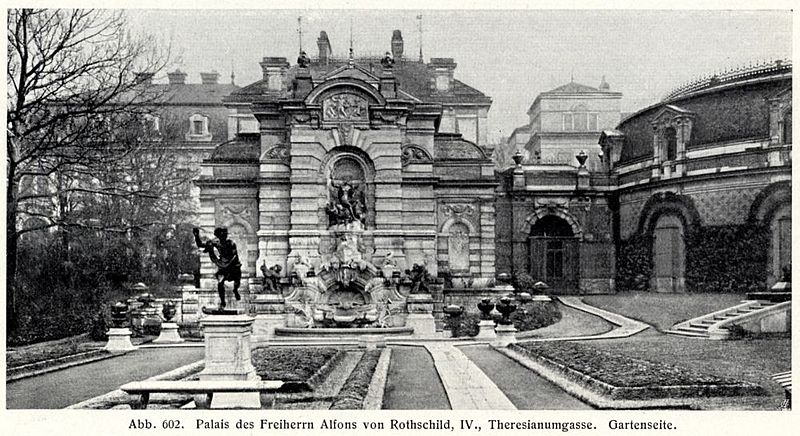
Palais Nathaniel Rothschild, gardens

From 1872 to 1884, he had the Palais Nathaniel Rothschild erected at 14-16 Theresianumgasse in Vienna-Wieden in a lavish Ringstraße style inspired by French Renaissance architecture. He himself lived alone in a small apartment, while in various parts of the building his large collection of art was on display. The palais was badly damaged by the bombing of Vienna in World War II and afterwards demolished.

In 1880, he purchased Enzesfeld Castle with its vast property from the Counts of Schönburg-Hartenstein. He also had Hinterleiten Palace in Reichenau an der Rax erected in a Louis XIII style from 1884. The picturesque Reichenau area had become easily accessible from Vienna by the opening of the Southern Railway line and evolved into a popular retreat of the Viennese society, among them Habsburg Archduke Karl Ludwig of Austria who had Villa Wartholz built nearby. Nevertheless, Nathaniel Rothschild only spent two years at his palace before he placed it at the disposal of the Ministry of War to use it as a convalescent home for veterans.

On his father's death in 1874, Nathaniel and his brother Ferdinand (1839–1898), owner of Waddesdon Manor, inherited most of the family's property and art collection. The family business went to the youngest brother Albert (1844–1911), who successfully carried on the financial empire.

Nathaniel Anselm von Rothschild died a bachelor in 1905. He is buried in the Zentralfriedhof, Vienna.
