= Šilheřovice =

- Municipality
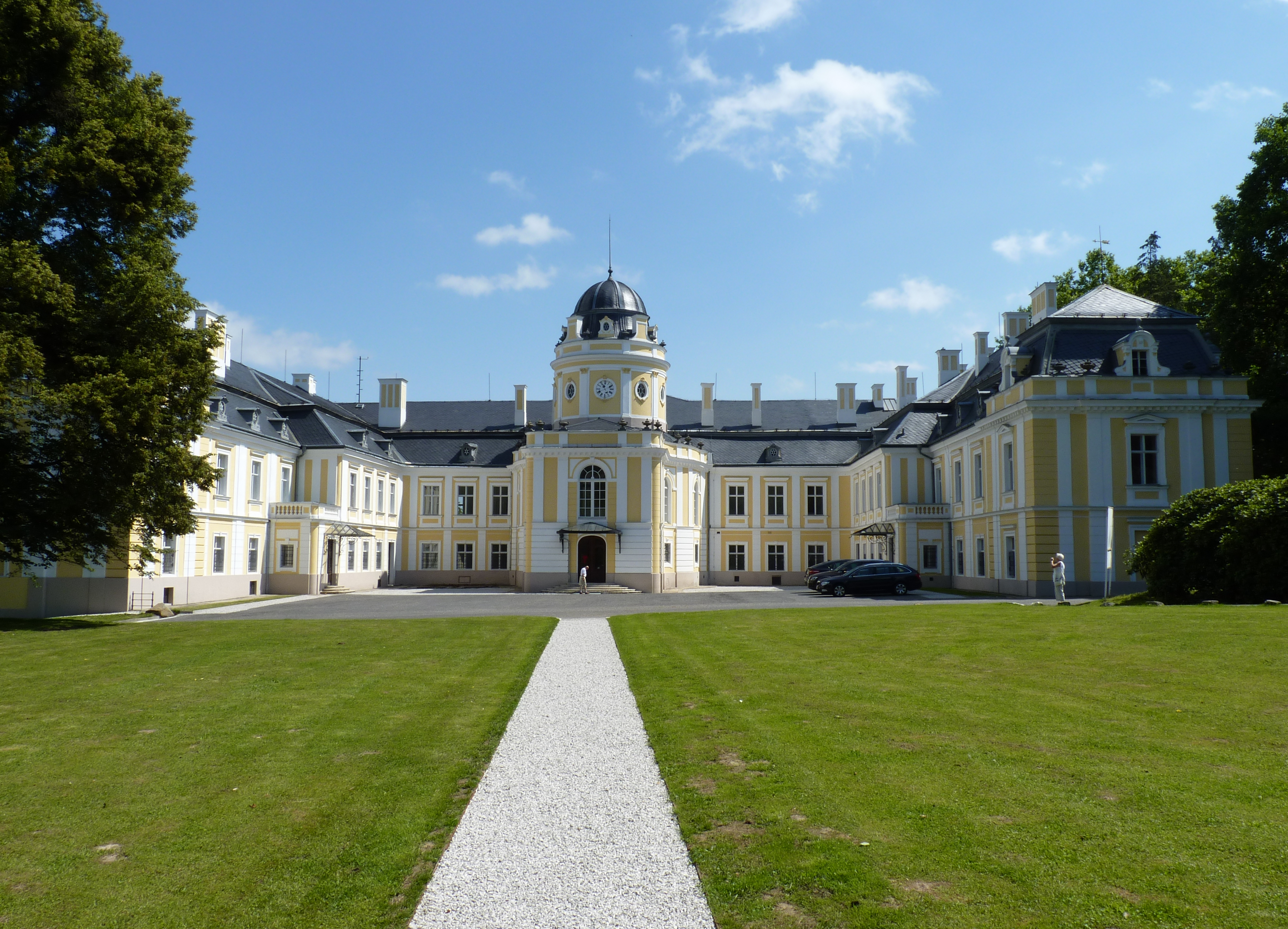
- Šilheřovice Castle

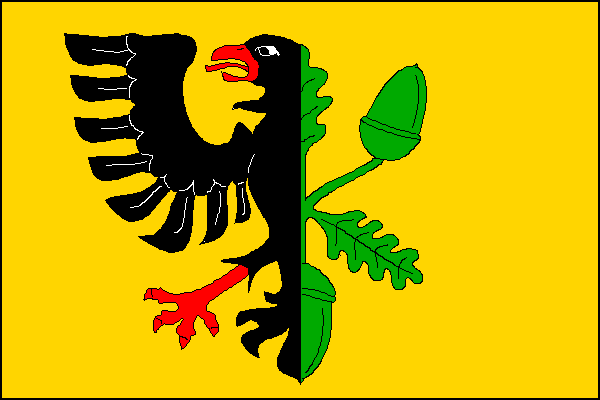
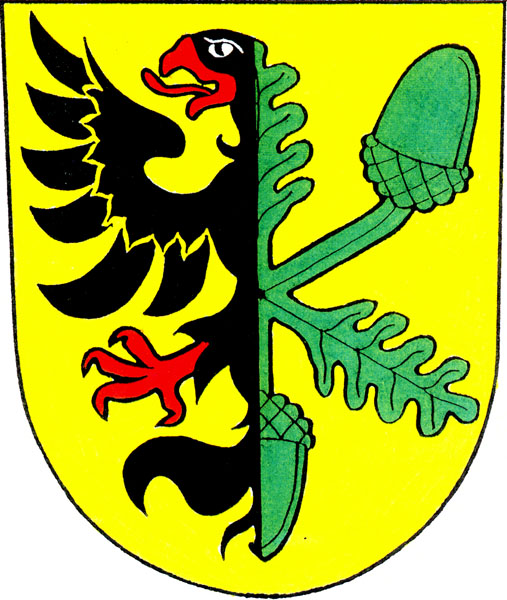
- Flag Coat of arms

- Location in the Czech Republic
- Coordinates: 49°55′34″N 18°16′13″E
- Country: Czech Republic
- Region: Moravian-Silesian
- District: Opava
- First mentioned: 1377

Area
  - Total: 21.65 km^{2} (8.36 sq mi)
- Elevation: 221 m (725 ft)

Population (2026-01-01)
  - Total: 1,622
  - Density: 74.92/km^{2} (194.0/sq mi)
- Time zone: UTC+1 (CET)
  - Summer (DST): UTC+2 (CEST)
- Postal code: 747 15
- Website: www.silherovice.cz

Šilheřovice (German: Schillersdorf, Polish: Szylerzowice) is a municipality and village in Opava District in the Moravian-Silesian Region of the Czech Republic. It has about 1,600 inhabitants. It is part of the historic Hlučín Region.

== Geography ==
Šilheřovice is located about 8 kilometres (5 mi) north of Ostrava, on the border with Poland. The western part of the municipality lies in the Opava Hilly Land, while the eastern part lies in the Ostrava Basin. The highest point is at 286 m (938 ft) above sea level. The stream Šilheřovický potok flows through the municipality and the Oder River briefly flows along the eastern municipal border.

== History ==
The first written mention of Šilheřovice is in a deed from 1377, according to which the properties of Duke Nicholas II were divided among his sons and Šilheřovice became property of Duke Nicholas III. The village was then part of the Silesian Duchy of Opava within the Lands of the Bohemian Crown. Along with the rest of the Hlučín Region, it was annexed by the Kingdom of Prussia after the First Silesian War in 1742.

In 1787, the Prussian nobleman Friedrich von Eichendorff purchased the estate and had a Neoclassical castle built, where his young nephew, the poet Joseph von Eichendorff, spent several vacations. In 1846, Šilheřovice Castle was acquired by Salomon Mayer von Rothschild, the progenitor of the Rothschild banking family of Austria. Following the end of World War I, in 1920, the Hlučín Region was incorporated into Czechoslovakia in accordance with the terms of the Treaty of Versailles. The Rothschilds owned the estate until 1938.

== Demographics ==
Historical population

Year	Pop.	±%
1869	1,311	—
1880	1,398	+6.6%
1890	1,381	−1.2%
1900	1,472	+6.6%
1910	1,483	+0.7%

Year	Pop.	±%
1921	1,597	+7.7%
1930	1,564	−2.1%
1950	1,547	−1.1%
1961	1,771	+14.5%
1970	1,558	−12.0%

Year	Pop.	±%
1980	1,567	+0.6%
1991	1,554	−0.8%
2001	1,520	−2.2%
2011	1,601	+5.3%
2021	1,572	−1.8%

Source: Censuses

== Transport ==
There are no railways or major roads passing through the municipality.

== Sport ==
A golf course is located in the castle park.

== Sights ==
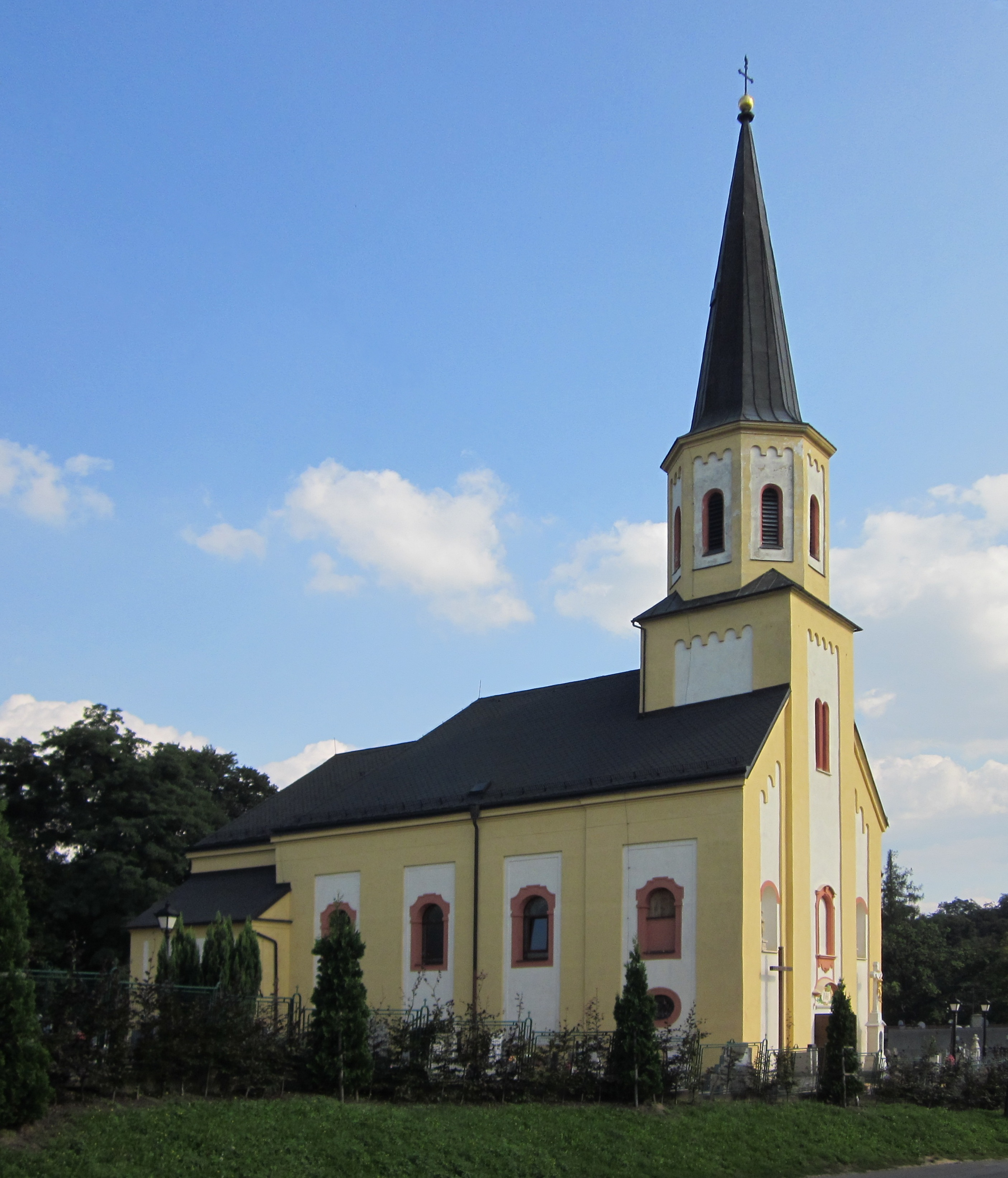
Church of the Assumption of the Virgin Mary

The main landmark is Šilheřovice Castle, built in 1787–1815. It is surrounded by a large English-style park. The park was expanded by the Rothschilds and greenhouses and orangeries were built. Today, the castle is privately owned and partially accessible during social events.

The Church of the Assumption of the Virgin Mary was built in the Baroque style in 1713.

== Notable people ==
- Georg Gawliczek (1919–1999), German football player and coach
