= Palais Nathaniel Rothschild =

Building in Vienna, Austria

Coordinates: 48°11′33″N 16°22′32″E

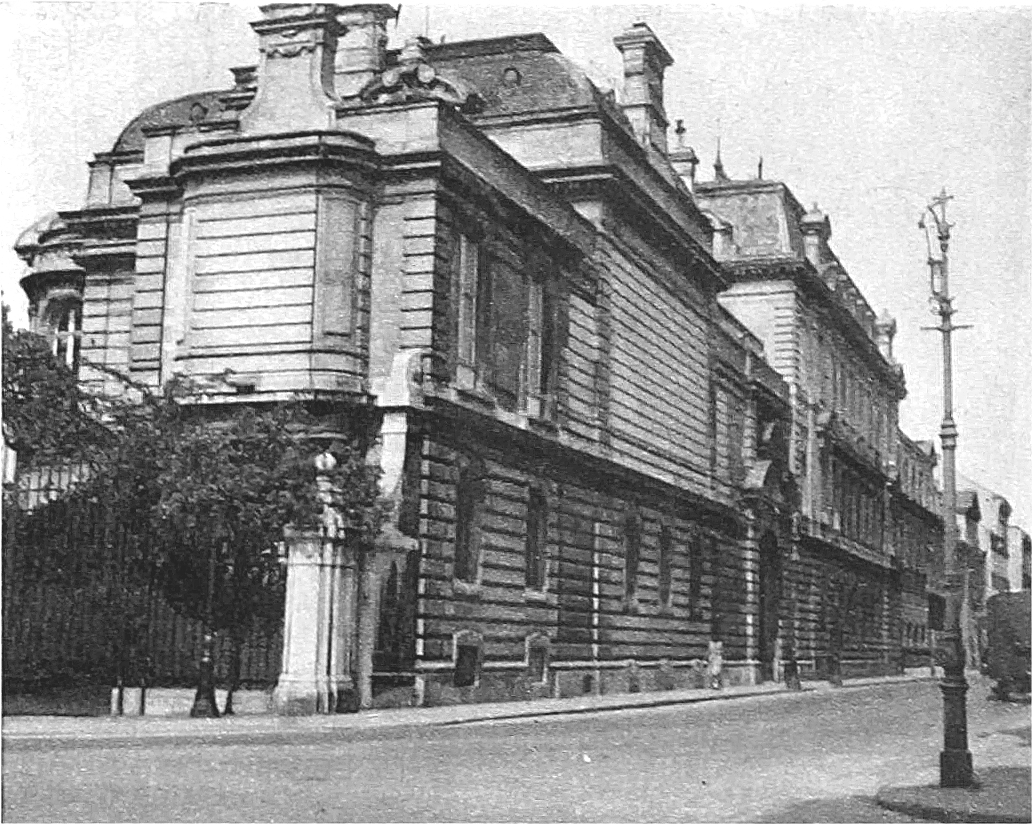
The home in 1931

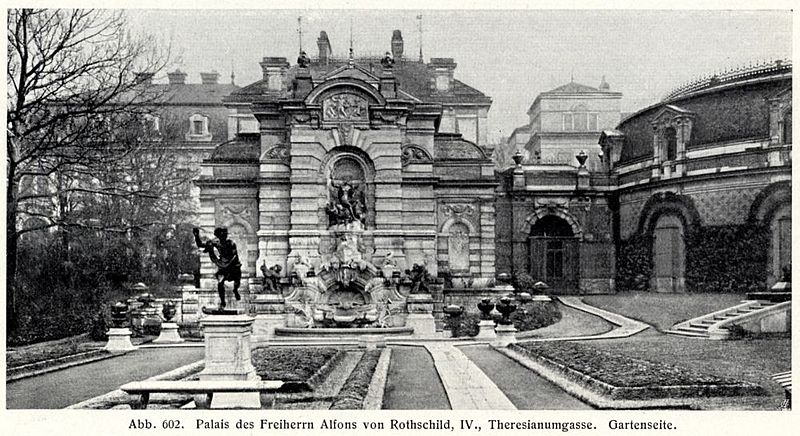
The garden of the residence

The Palais Nathaniel Rothschild was a palatial residence in Vienna, Austria. It was one of five Palais Rothschild in the city that were owned by members of the Rothschild banking family of Austria.

== History ==
It was commissioned by Baron Nathaniel von Rothschild (1836–1905), who was an older brother of Baron Albert von Rothschild. French architect Jean Girette designed and built the French neo-baroque style palace between 1871 and 1878. It was situated at Theresianumgasse 16-18, in the 4th (Wieden) district of Vienna.

The palace was two stories high and surrounded by a lush garden decorated with fountains and sculptures, the whole built to showcase the wealth of the Rothschild family. Baron Nathaniel organized a large ball for the housewarming, including an orchestra playing antique instruments from the Baron's own priceless collection of musical instruments. The art collection that was housed there was renowned. Baron Nathaniel was also famous for his substantial philanthropic and charitable activities.

After the Anschluß (annexation) of Austria by Nazi Germany in 1938, the family members were forced to flee and their estates were seized by the Nazis. The Gestapo moved in and used this palace for their interrogations. The building itself was heavily damaged during Allied bombing raids in 1944.

At the end of World War II, the owners returned to find a smoldering ruin. The ruins were torn down; some of the materials were used for reconstruction around the city, apparently including the Stephansdom. The estate was eventually sold to the Austrian Chamber of Labour by the sole heiress, Baroness Clarice de Rothschild, in 1950. The Chamber of Labour had the rest of the ruins pulled down and erected a simple modern building for its trainees.
