= Rothschild banking family of Naples =

Neapolitan banking family

Arms of the Rothschild family

The Rothschild banking family of Naples (Italian: Famiglia di banchieri Rothschild) was the Neapolitan (and later Italian) branch of the Rothschild family. It was founded by Carl Mayer von Rothschild (1788–1855), who was sent to the Kingdom of the Two Sicilies from Frankfurt in 1821.

Endogamy within the family was an essential part of the Rothschild strategy in order to ensure control of their wealth remained in the family's hands. Through their collaborative efforts, the Rothschilds rose to prominence in a variety of banking endeavors including loans, government bonds, and trading in bullion. Their financing afforded investment opportunities and during the 19th century, they became major stakeholders in large-scale mining and rail transport ventures that were fundamental to the rapidly expanding industrial economies of Europe.

By 1820, N M Rothschild & Sons bank was already operating successfully in London, de Rothschild Frères in Paris, and S M von Rothschild in Vienna, Austria where Salomon Mayer von Rothschild became a powerful ally of Austria's Prince Klemens Metternich. In March 1821, in support of King Ferdinand I of the Two Sicilies, the Austrian army entered the Sicilian Kingdom and occupied Naples. This event opened the door to the Rothschild interests and Carl von Rothschild was sent to Naples where he established C M de Rothschild & Figli to operate as a satellite office to the Rothschild banking family of Germany headquarters in Frankfurt am Main.

== Elevation to Austrian nobility ==
In 1822, the five Rothschild brothers at the head of the family's banks in various parts of Europe were each granted the hereditary title of Freiherr (baron) in the Austrian nobility by Emperor Francis I of Austria (formerly Francis II, the last Holy Roman Emperor). As a result, some members of the Rothschild family used the nobiliary particle de or von before their surname to acknowledge the grant of nobility.

== Involvement in finance and industry ==
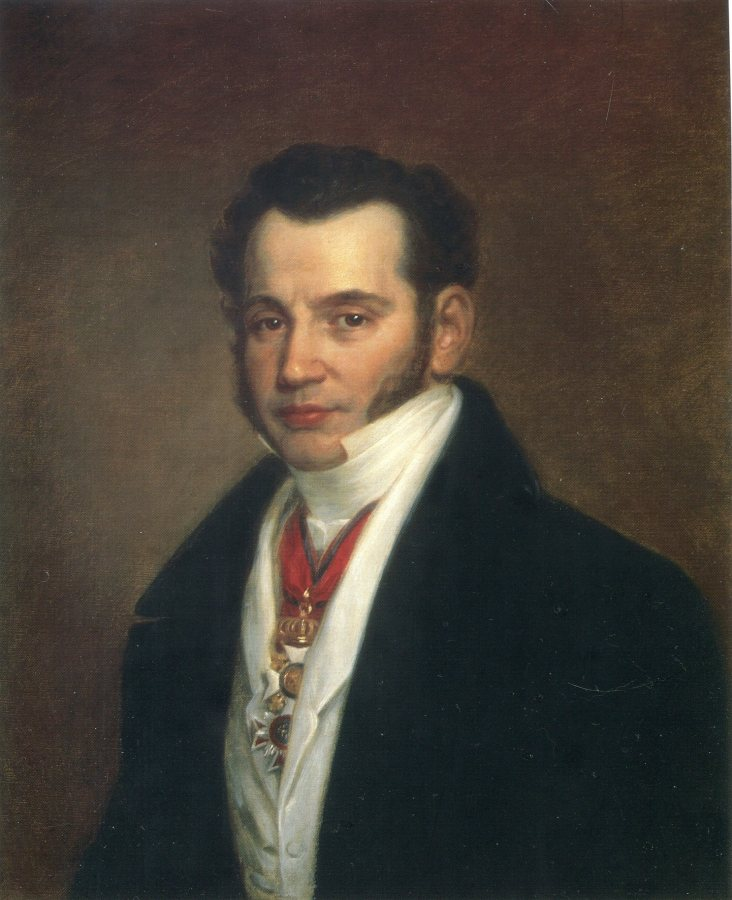
Carl Mayer von Rothschild, founder of the Neopolitan branch of the Rothschild banking dynasty.

Carl von Rothschild developed a good working relationship with Luigi de' Medici, the "Direttore della Segreteria di Azienda del Regno di Napoli" (Finance Minister), and his operation became the dominant banking house in Naples. As a result of Carl's success, the Rothschilds had a substantial banking presence in England and three other major European capitals, giving the family considerable influence and an advantage over their competitors. During the winter of 1826, Leopold of Saxe-Coburg, future King of the Belgians was a guest of Carl von Rothschild at his villa in Naples. In 1829, he was appointed consul-general of Sicily at Frankfurt and in January 1832 the Jewish banker was given a ribbon and star of the Sacred Military Constantinian Order of Saint George at a ceremony with the new Pope, Gregory XVI.

The bank, C M de Rothschild & Figli, arranged substantial loans to the Papal States and to various Kings of Naples plus the Duchy of Parma and the Grand Duchy of Tuscany. However, in the 1830s, Naples followed Spain with a gradual shift away from conventional bond issues that began to affect the bank's growth and profitability. During the second half of the 1840s, the business evidenced no growth and was only marginally profitable.

The year 1855 was one of considerable change for the Rothschild family with the death of the head of both the Naples and German branches. Of the three sons of Carl von Rothschild, the eldest, Mayer, and the youngest surviving son, Wilhelm, succeeded their childless uncle Amschel Mayer von Rothschild in Frankfurt while the middle son Adolphe reluctantly agreed to run the Naples branch. The succession negotiations were marked by considerable rancor as cousin Anselm von Rothschild, the then head of the Rothschild banking family of Austria, disagreed with the decision and Adolphe felt he had been unfairly treated.

== Closure of the Naples branch ==
The end of the Naples branch began when revolution broke out and Giuseppe Garibaldi captured Naples on September 7, 1860, and set up a provisional government. Because of the family's close political connections with Austria and France, Adolphe Carl von Rothschild was caught in a delicate position. He chose to take temporary sanctuary in Gaeta with the Bourbon king Francis II of the Two Sicilies but the Rothschild houses in London, Paris, and Vienna were not prepared to financially support the deposed king. With the ensuing unification of Italy and the mounting tension between Adolf and the rest of the family, after forty-two years in business, the Naples house closed in 1863.

Mathilde Hannah von Rothschild (1832–1924) of the Austrian branch of the family, who married Wilhelm Carl von Rothschild of Naples/Frankfurt, founded and endowed the Carl von Rothschild Public Library as a public institution. In 1901, at the time of the closure of the Rothschilds' Frankfurt office, family discussions took place concerning the disposition of the records of the Naples house. Alphonse James de Rothschild opposed the idea of preserving the documents in the Rothschild Library in Frankfurt and eventually it was agreed that all the Naples office records be destroyed.

The brothers Mayer Carl and Wilhelm Carl von Rothschild had only daughters (ten in total) and with the 1935 deaths of Emma Louisa de Rothschild (daughter of Mayer Carl) and Adelheid de Rothschild (daughter of Wilhelm Carl), the Neapolitan branch went extinct in the male line.

All branches of the Rothschild banking family are famous for their art collections and a number for their palatial estates. Because the Naples branch was run by just two family members, father Carl Mayer von Rothschild, and son Adolphe, the only great property they occupied there was the Villa Pignatelli at Riviera di Chiaia with a spectacular view of Mount Vesuvius, acquired in 1841.

== Family members ==
Members of the Rothschild family of Naples include:

- Charlotte von Rothschild (1819–1884)
- Carl Mayer von Rothschild (1788–1855)
- Bina Rothschild (1902–1965)

== See also ==
- Rothschild family
- Rothschild banking family of Austria
- Rothschild banking family of England
- Rothschild banking family of France
