= Caroline Julie Anselme von Rothschild =

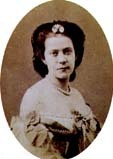
Julie von Rothschild

Freifrau Caroline Julie Anselme von Rothschild (born 2 September 1830 in Frankfurt am Main; died 18 November 1907 in Pregny) was a member of the Rothschild family. She belonged to the Austrian branch of the family.

== Life ==
Julie von Rothschild was born in Frankfurt am Main on 2 September 1830. She was the daughter of Charlotte Nathan Rothschild and Anselm Salomon von Rothschild, who had taken over the management of the family's Viennese banking house. On 16 October 1850, Julie von Rothschild married her cousin Adolph Carl von Rothschild, who had been assigned by the family to manage the Neapolitan banking house.

Julie von Rothschild had a strong interest in art, especially French art objects of the 18th century; her husband shared this interest and was an important art collector. The couple owned an apartment in Paris and built a château in Pregny on Lake Geneva, which they moved into in 1858. The Rothschild banking house in Naples had to be closed in 1863 after the political situation in Italy had changed. In 1860, Giuseppe Garibaldi captured Naples, and the Rothschilds withdrew to Gaeta. In 1865, Adolph Carl von Rothschild became the first Rothschild to be paid out of the family partnership.

=== Photography and social life ===
In Paris, the couple lived on the Rue de Monceau, where Julie von Rothschild had a side wing added to her city palace. In it, she installed a two-storey photographic studio. A photographic studio was also set up in Pregny. In both Paris and Pregny, Julie von Rothschild led a glittering social life. She was known for her fondness for smoking large cigars, which caused amazement and amusement among her younger nieces. She furnished her château with collected works of art. She received prominent friends such as Empress Elisabeth of Austria, who spent the last evening before her assassination in Julie von Rothschild's company and also admired her orchid cultivation in Pregny.

Adolph Carl von Rothschild died in 1900, after which Julie von Rothschild withdrew to Pregny. She nevertheless continued to support the ophthalmological clinics that Adolph Carl von Rothschild had founded and financed in Geneva and Paris after he himself had undergone eye surgery following a railway accident. An ophthalmological foundation was established for the clinics; Julie von Rothschild endowed it with capital and continued to take care of it.

When Julie von Rothschild died in Pregny on 18 November 1907, she left her fortune to Maurice de Rothschild.

=== La Gitana ===
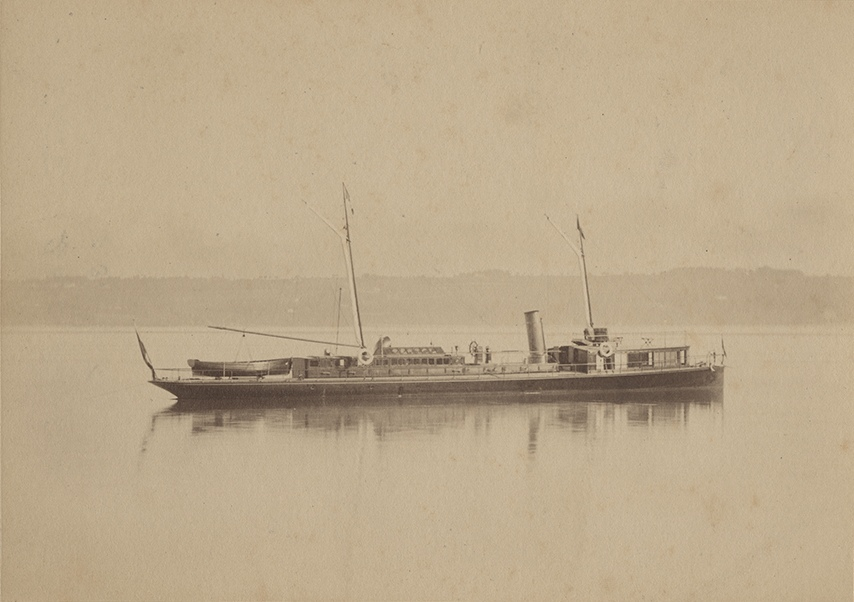
La Gitana, 1877

In 1875, Julie von Rothschild commissioned the yacht La Gitana, which was launched on Lake Geneva on 21 September 1876. Gitana was built by the English shipyard Thornycroft and was 24.45 m long. The origin of the name is uncertain. According to one hypothesis, Julie von Rothschild was known within the family as "La Gitane" ("the Gypsy woman") and named her steam yacht after this nickname; according to another version, she was inspired by her love of music. She is said to have particularly enjoyed the role of the Gypsy Azucena in Verdi's Il trovatore. La Gitana was a steam launch with a steel hull. On Lake Geneva, La Gitana reached a speed of 20.5 knots. This was a world record and earned Julie von Rothschild the nickname "the fastest yachting lady in the world". She had a second yacht built by the French shipyard Augustin Normand in Le Havre, which was renowned for its very fast vessels. This yacht reached a length of 37 m. In 1898, Gitana II covered the route from Coppet to Saint-Prex on Lake Geneva at an average speed of 26.34 knots in 34 minutes and 12 seconds, setting a new record time. Gitana II had a deck saloon, a ladies-only lounge, two toilets, a kitchen and an office. Through these vessels, Rothschild laid the foundation for her family's passion for yachting.
