= Nathaniel Rothschild =

Nathaniel Rothschild may refer to:

- Nathaniel de Rothschild (1812–1870), banker and vintner, Château Mouton Rothschild
- Nathaniel Mayer von Rothschild (1836–1905), member of the Rothschild banking family of Austria
- (Nathaniel) Charles Rothschild (1877–1923), British banker and entomologist
- (Nathaniel Charles) Jacob Rothschild, 4th Baron Rothschild (1936–2024), British investment banker
- Nathaniel Rothschild, 5th Baron Rothschild (born 1971), British investor, former co-chairman of Atticus Capital

== See also ==
- Nathan Mayer Rothschild (1777–1836), British banker
- Nathan Rothschild, 1st Baron Rothschild (1840–1915), British banker and politician
