= Anselm Salomon von Rothschild =

Austrian banker

Baron Anselm Salomon von Rothschild
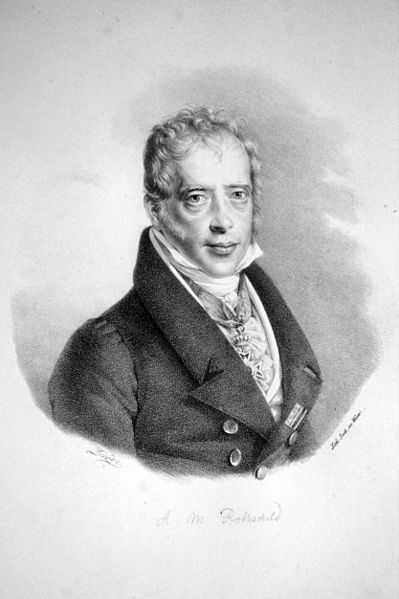
- Born: 29 January 1803; Free City of Frankfurt, Holy Roman Empire
- Died: 27 July 1874 (aged 71); Vienna, Austria-Hungary
- Occupations: Banker, philanthropist, member of the Imperial Council
- Known for: Founder of: Creditanstalt, Rothschild Hospital
- Board member of: S M von Rothschild, Creditanstalt, Austrian Southern Railway
- Spouse: Charlotte Nathan Rothschild
- Parent(s): Salomon Mayer von Rothschild & Caroline Stern

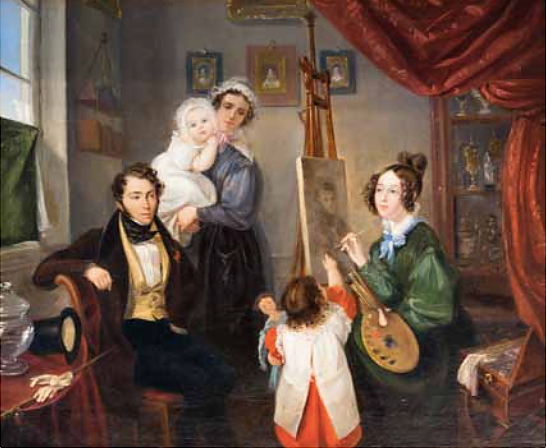
Self-portrait with her family by Charlotte Nathan Rothschild, Baron Anselm's wife, 1838. Part of Baron Anselm's collection can be seen behind her.

Anselm Salomon von Schwartz Rothschild, Baron Rothschild (29 January 1803 – 27 July 1874) was an Austrian banker, founder of the Creditanstalt, and a member of the Vienna branch of the Rothschild family.

== Family ==
He was born in the Imperial City of Frankfurt, the son of Freiherr Salomon Mayer von Rothschild (1774–1855), ancestor of the family's Austrian branch, and his wife Caroline Stern (1782–1854). He had a younger sister Betty (1805–1874), who married her French uncle James Mayer de Rothschild.

According to the testament left by progenitor Mayer Amschel Rothschild, the children of the Rothschild family were obliged to enter into matrimony with their first and second cousins. Anselm Salomon did so in 1826 by marrying Charlotte Nathan Rothschild (1807–1859), daughter of his uncle Nathan Mayer Rothschild (1777–1836) from the British branch of the family; together they had eight children:

- Mayer Anselm Leon (1827–1828)
- Caroline Julie Anselm (1830–1907), "Julie", married Adolph Carl von Rothschild (1823–1900), son of Carl Mayer von Rothschild at Naples, lived at Rothschild Castle in Pregny-Chambésy near Geneva
- Mathilde Hannah von Rothschild (1832–1924), married Freiherr Wilhelm Carl von Rothschild (1828–1901), banker at Frankfurt
- Sarah Luisa (1834–1924), married Baron Raimondo Franchetti (1829–1905), lived at Palazzo Cavalli-Franchetti in Venice
- Nathaniel Anselm (1836–1905), maecenas at Vienna
- Ferdinand James (1839–1898), moved to the United Kingdom, had Waddesdon Manor built from 1874
- Albert Salomon (1844–1911), took over the running of the family's Viennese bank
- Alice Charlotte (1847–1922), lived at Eythrope, UK, near her brother Ferdinand, from whom she inherited Waddeson Manor, and later moved to Grasse, France.

== Life ==
In 1820 Anselm Salomon's father Salomon Mayer had established a bank company at Vienna, financing the building of the Austrian Emperor Ferdinand Northern Railway in the 1830s. He had been a confidant of Chancellor Prince Klemens von Metternich and also a discreet lender of the Bohemian and Hungarian nobility. Upon his death in 1855, his son and heir Anselm created the k.k. privilegierte Österreichische Credit-Anstalt für Handel und Gewerbe, which evolved to the largest bank of the Austro-Hungarian Monarchy.

Anselm himself gradually retired from the banking business in the 1860s and participated in the Austrian Southern Railway company. He rejected the Austro-Prussian War of 1866 and refused to accommodate any side with money. As a philanthropist, he founded the Vienna Rothschild Hospital in 1869. He was also a prominent art collector, honorary citizen, and an appointed member of the Austrian House of Lords from 1861. He died in Vienna.

He began the art collection that his son Ferdinand bequeathed in 1898 to the British Museum as the Waddesdon Bequest, collecting mostly metalwork, especially of the Northern Renaissance. The Holy Thorn Reliquary was one of his purchases. His collection was catalogued and partly photographed by the art historian Franz Schestag in 1866 and 1872.
