= Rothschild banking family of Austria =

Austrian banking family

Arms of the Rothschild family

The Rothschild banking family of Austria (Austrian German: Rothschild Bankiersfamilie) was the Austrian branch of the Rothschild family. It was founded in 1820 by Salomon Mayer von Rothschild in Vienna, which was then part of the Austrian Empire.

== History ==
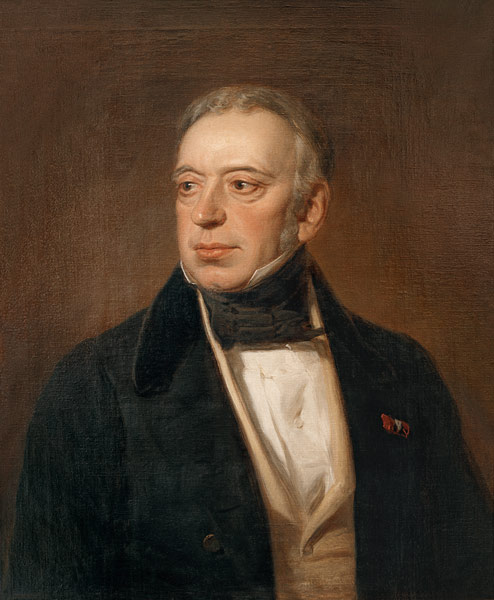
Salomon Rothschild, founder of the Austrian branch of the Rothschild banking dynasty.

Salomon Mayer had been sent to Austria from his home in Frankfurt by his father, Mayer Amschel Rothschild (1744–1812). Wanting his sons to succeed on their own and to expand the family business across Europe, Mayer Amschel Rothschild had his eldest son remain in Frankfurt, while his four other sons were sent to different European cities with the mission of establishing a financial institution to invest in business and provide banking services. Endogamy within the family was an essential part of the Rothschild strategy in order to ensure control of their wealth remained in family hands. Through their collaborative efforts, the Rothschilds rose to prominence in a variety of banking endeavours, including loans, government bonds and trading in bullion. Their financing afforded investment opportunities, and during the 19th century, they became major stakeholders in large-scale mining and rail transport ventures that were fundamental to the rapidly expanding industrial economies of Europe.

Salomon von Rothschild established S M von Rothschild, a banking and investment entity that would be highly successful, playing an integral role in the development of the Austrian economy. In 1836, the bank invested in and financed the building of the Nordbahn rail network, Austria's first steam railway. It also financed various government undertakings where large amounts of capital had to be raised.

In 1822, the five Rothschild brothers at the head of the family's banks in various parts of Europe were each granted the hereditary title of Freiherr (baron) in the Austrian nobility by Emperor Francis I of Austria. Their main rivals were the Macedo-Romanian Sina family.

In 1929, the family's Creditanstalt was affected by the banking collapse that brought in the Great Depression.

The Rothschild business empire in Austria was passed down to ensuing generations until the March 13, 1938 Anschluss of Austria to Nazi Germany, when the family was pressured to sell its banking operations at a fraction of its real worth. While other Rothschilds had escaped the Nazis, Baron Louis was imprisoned for a year and only released after a substantial ransom was paid by his family. This ransom was later used to finance the further murder of Jews seen as "lesser" than the Rothschilds. After Louis was allowed to leave the country, in March 1939, the Nazis placed the firm of S M von Rothschild under compulsory administration. Nazi officers and senior staff from Austrian museums also emptied the Rothschild family estates of all their valuables. Post-war, some of the family's assets were restored to the survivors, but others were not. In 1999, as a result of international Jewish pressure groups along with a determined personal effort by Bettina von Rothschild, the government of Austria returned some 250 Rothschild art treasures worth more than US$100 million. The artworks, which had been looted by the Nazis and placed in the Kunsthistorisches, the Albertina, the Leopold Museum and other state museums after World War II, were returned to the eldest surviving heir of two Vienna Rothschild brothers.

Further, in 2001, files involving more than 40,000 papers taken from the Rothschild family in Vienna by the Nazis, were voluntarily returned by the Russian government to them from the State Military Archive in Moscow. The Russian government inherited the papers from the Soviet Union which obtained the papers during the fall of Berlin during World War II. The documents are now part of the Rothschild Archive in London.

With the 2012 death of Bettina Jemima Looram de Rothschild (1924–2012), the second child of Alphonse Mayer de Rothschild, the Austrian branch has become extinct in the male line, although there are numerous descendants through female lines.

The historian Roman Sandgruber assessed in 2018: "The Austrian line of the family occupies a special position. It is the story of a fairytale rise .. to the largest bank of the Habsburg monarchy and a tragic decline in the economic turmoil of the interwar period and in the robbery of the National Socialists".

== Philanthropy ==
The Austrian Rothschilds and members of the other branches in Europe were all major contributors to causes in aid of the Jewish people. However, many of their philanthropic efforts extended far beyond Jewish ethnic or religious communities. They built hospitals and shelters for the needy, supported cultural institutions and were patrons of individual artists. Their donation of works of art to various galleries has been the largest of any family in history. At present, a research project is underway, by The Rothschild Archive in London, to document the family's philanthropic involvements.

The business success of the Austrian Rothschilds allowed them to become great patrons of the arts and substantial contributors to philanthropic causes that include a major donation in 1844 to help build a polytechnic institution in Brno, the Rothschild Hospital built in 1869 by Anselm von Rothschild, the construction of a Vienna hospital for women in 1892, and the founding of psychiatric institutions in 1898 by Nathaniel Anselm von Rothschild.

== Family members ==
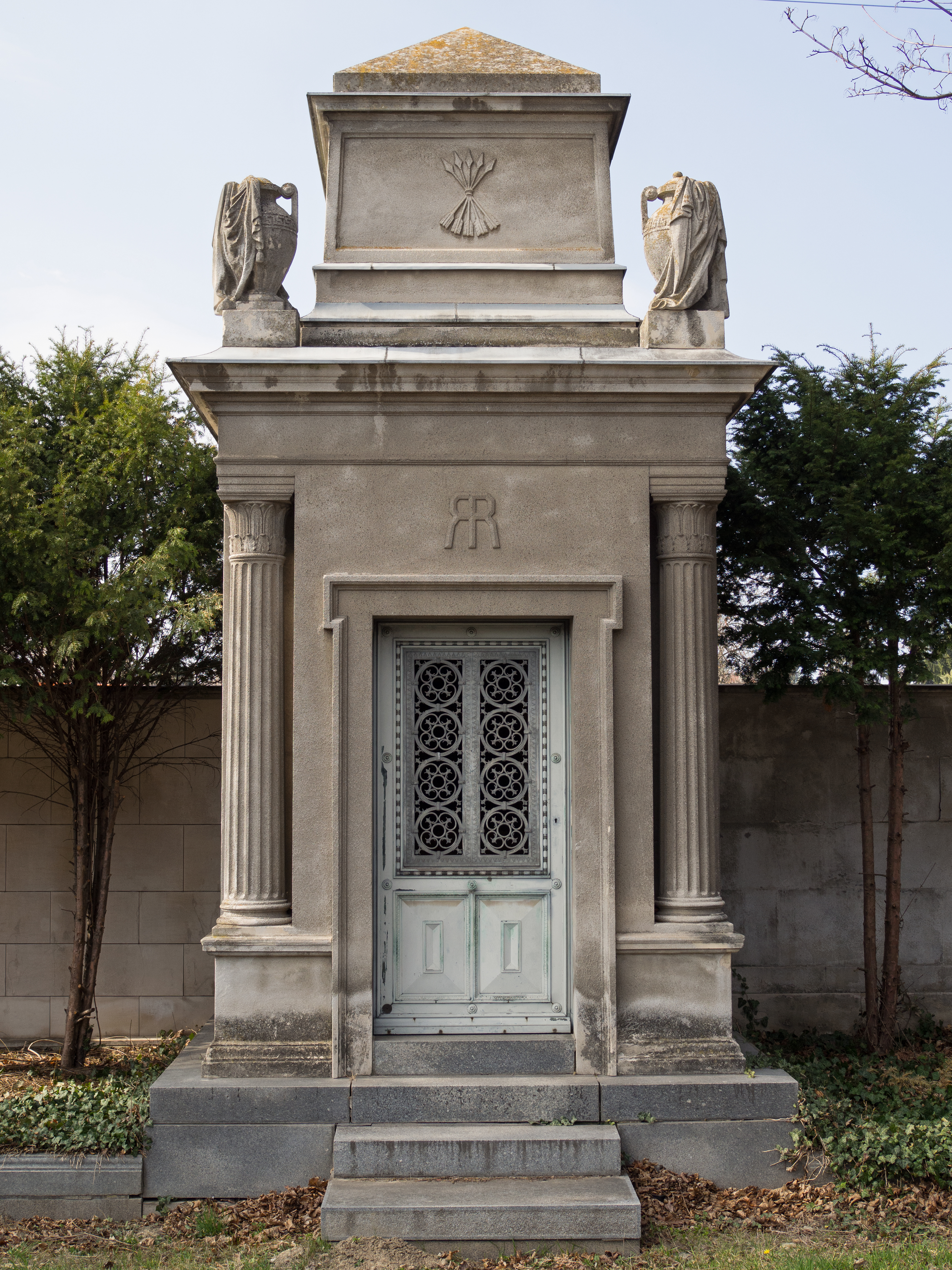
Rothschild family mausoleum at the Vienna Central Cemetery

Members of the Rothschild family of Austria include:

- Salomon Mayer von Rothschild (1774-1855), founder of the Austrian branch
  - Anselm Salomon von Rothschild (1803-1874)
    - Mathilde Hannah von Rothschild (1832-1924)
    - Nathaniel Meyer von Rothschild (1836-1905)
    - Ferdinand James von Rothschild (1839-1898)
    - Albert Salomon Anselm von Rothschild (1844-1911)
      - Alphonse Mayer von Rothschild (1878-1942)
      - Ludwig (Louis) von Rothschild (1882-1955)
      - Eugène Daniel von Rothschild (1884-1976)
        - Jeanne Stuart von Rothschild (1908-2003), wife of Eugène
    - Alice Charlotte von Rothschild (1847-1922)

== Rothschild properties ==
All branches of the Rothschild banking family are famous for their art collections and many for their palatial estates. Ferdinand James von Rothschild moved permanently to England to build Waddesdon Manor. In Austria-Hungary, the acquisition of property by branch founder Salomon Mayer Rothschild was especially significant because at the time Jews were barred from the purchase of real estate, except in designated areas. Among the Rothschild properties in Austria were:

- Villa Victoria - Grasse, Alpes-Maritimes, France
- Enzesfeld Castle - Enzesfeld-Lindabrunn, Lower Austria
- Palais Rothschild - the name of several properties in Vienna, all of which were confiscated following the Anschluss
- Schloss Rothschild - Reichenau an der Rax, Lower Austria
- Rothschildschloss - Waidhofen an der Ybbs, Lower Austria
- Schillersdorf Castle - Šilheřovice, Czech Silesia

== See also ==
- Rothschild family
- Rothschild banking family of England
- Rothschild banking family of France
- Rothschild banking family of Naples
