= Georg Gawliczek =

German footballer and manager

Personal information
- Full name: Georg Gawliczek
- Date of birth: 2 February 1919
- Place of birth: Schillersdorf, Upper Silesia Province
- Date of death: 4 September 1999 (aged 80)
- Place of death: Karlsruhe, Germany
- Position: Winger

Youth career
- Meidericher SV

Senior career*
Years	Team	Apps	(Gls)
1943–1947	FC Schalke 04		
1947–1949	Meidericher SV		
1949–1950	1. FC Kaiserslautern		
1951–1953	1. FC Köln	56	(2)
1953–1954	SV Phönix Ludwigshafen	30	(4)

Managerial career
- 1955–1956: FC Phönix Bellheim
- 1956–1960: Germany (assistant)
- 1960–1964: FC Schalke 04
- 1964–1966: Hamburger SV
- 1967–1968: Karlsruher SC
- 1969–1970: FC Zürich
- 1970–1971: Young Fellows Zürich
- 1971–1973: SV Südwest Ludwigshafen
- 1973–1975: Tennis Borussia Berlin
- 1975–1976: SC Wacker 04 Berlin
- 1976–1978: Freiburger FC
- 1978–1980: SV Waldhof Mannheim
- 1981–1983: Hertha BSC
- * Club domestic league appearances and goals

Georg Gawliczek (2 February 1919 – 4 September 1999) was a German football manager and former player.
