= Creditanstalt =

Defunct large Austrian bank

Creditanstalt AG
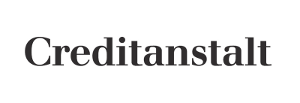

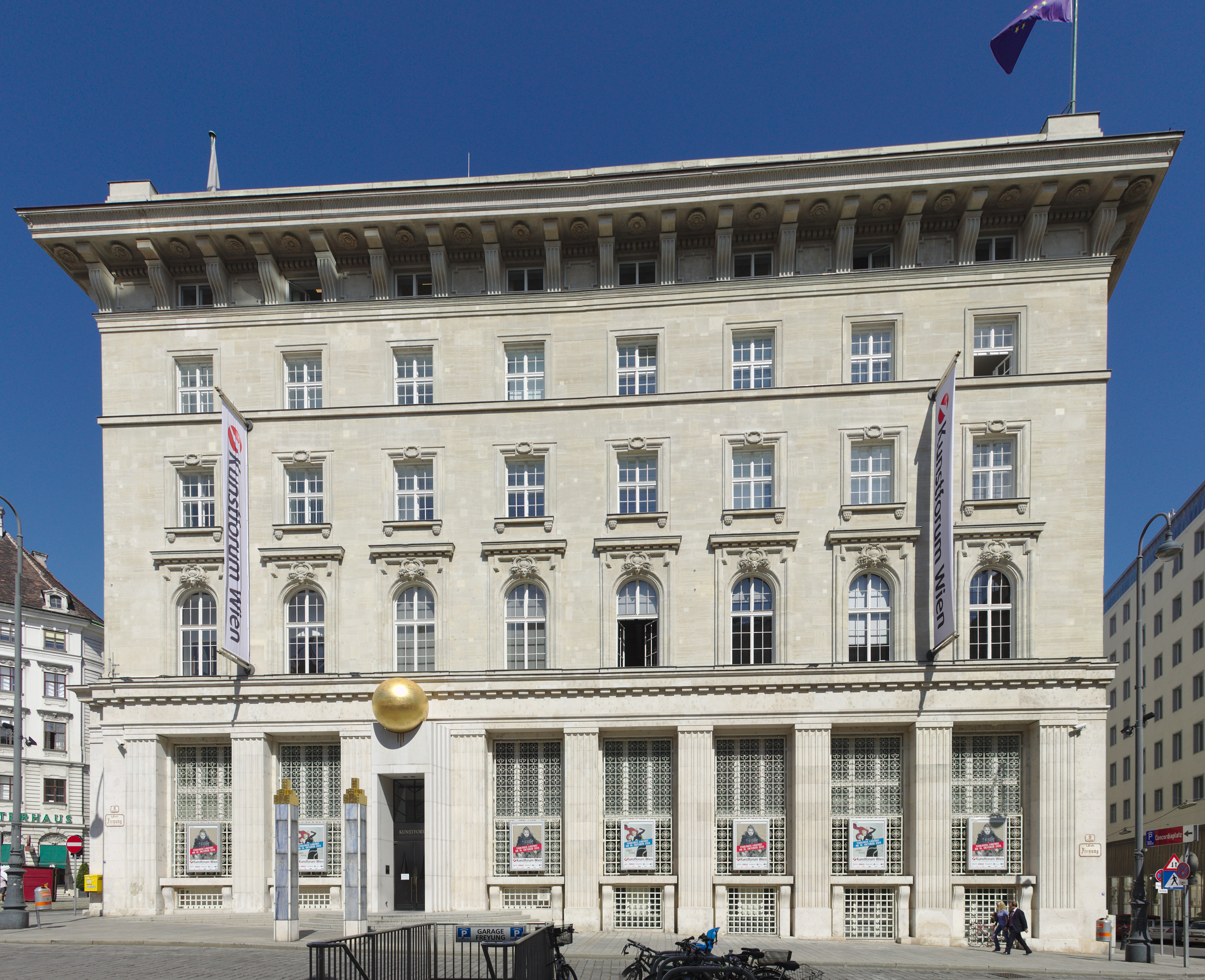
- Creditanstalt head office during the 1920s and early 1930s on the Freyung, in 2014 as Bank Austria Kunstforum
- Industry: Financial services
- Founded: 1855
- Founder: Anselm von Rothschild
- Fate: Merged with Bank Austria in 2002
- Successor: Bank Austria-Creditanstalt
- Headquarters: Vienna, Austria

The Creditanstalt (sometimes Credit-Anstalt, abbreviated as CA), full original name k. k. priv. Österreichische Credit-Anstalt für Handel und Gewerbe (lit. 'Imperial and Royal privileged Austrian Credit Institution for Commerce and Industry'), was a major Austrian bank, founded in 1855 in Vienna.

From its founding until 1931, the Creditanstalt was led by members of the Rothschild family, who were among its significant shareholders. Its historically consequential failure in 1931 led to a merger engineered by the Austrian government in 1934, in which it combined with the Wiener Bankverein and the sound parts of the Niederösterreichische Escompte-Gesellschaft to form Österreichische Creditanstalt – Wiener Bankverein, later abbreviated to Creditanstalt-Bankverein. The latter came under the control of Deutsche Bank following the Anschluss in 1938, was nationalized in 1945, and was eventually acquired in 1997 by Bank Austria to form Bank Austria-Creditanstalt, since 2005 has been a subsidiary of UniCredit. UniCredit phased out the Creditanstalt brand in 2008.

== Foundation and development until 1931 ==
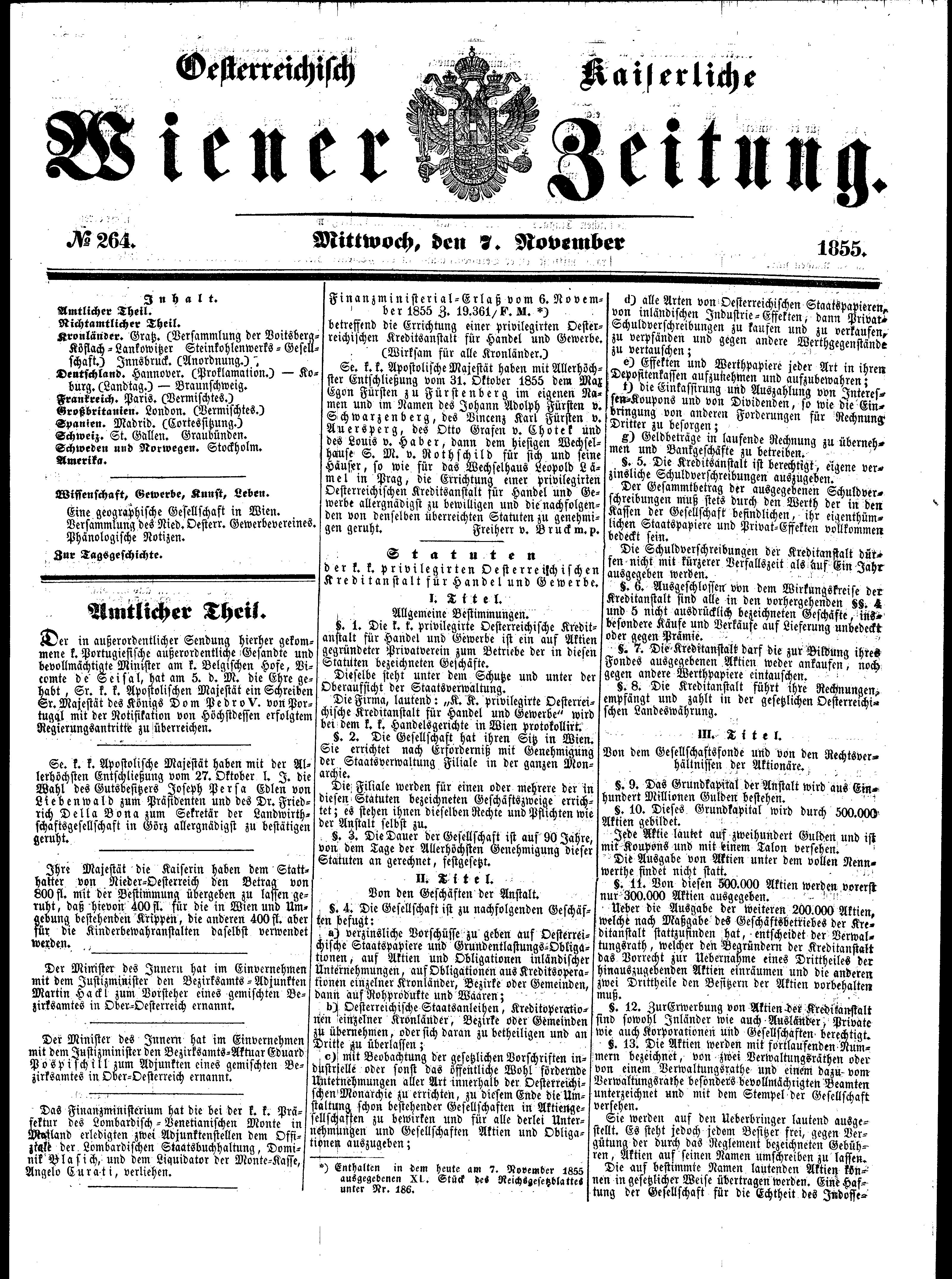
Advert of Creditanstalt's creation in Wiener Zeitung, 6 November 1855

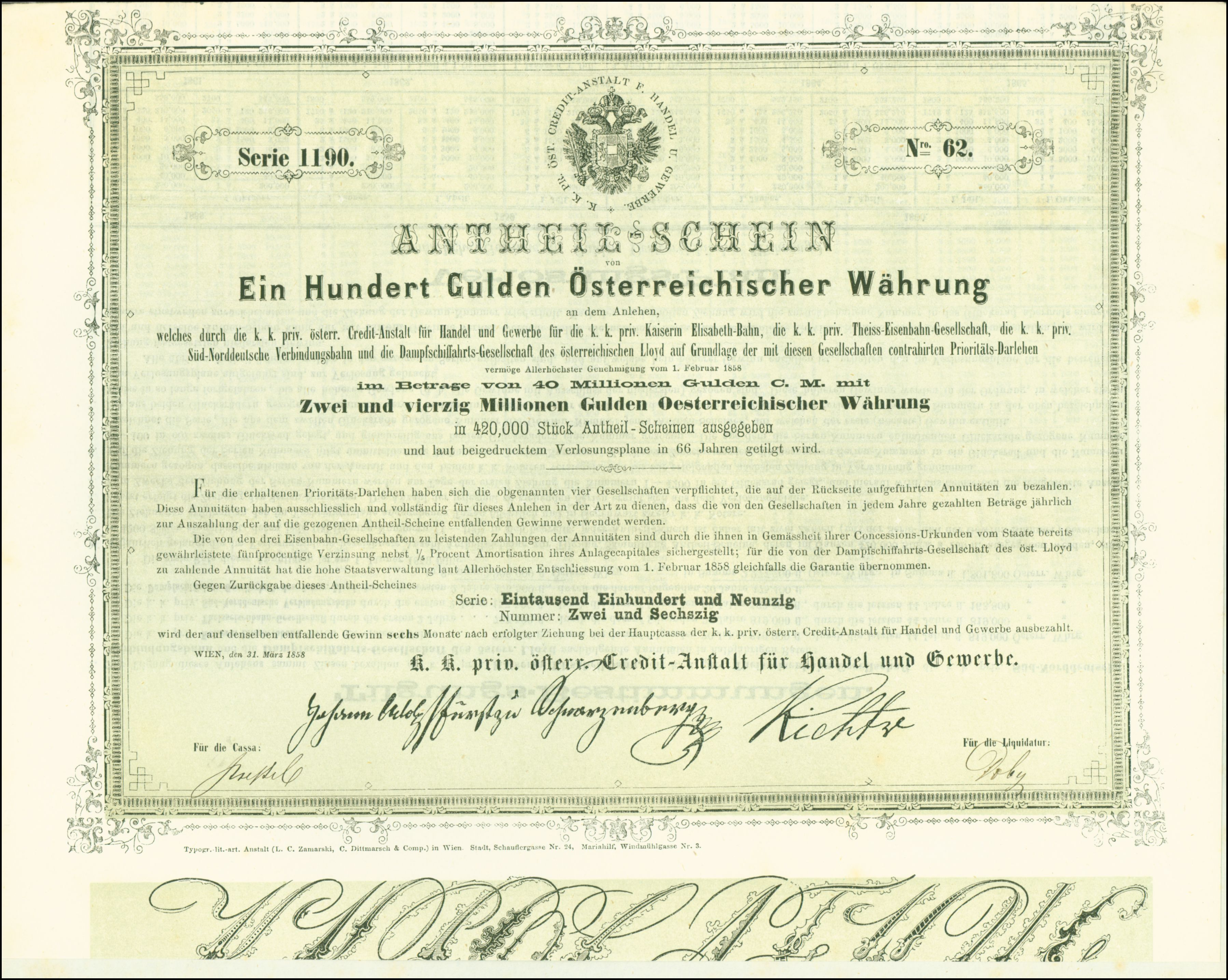
Share certificate of the Credit-Anstalt für Handel und Gewerbe, issued 31 March 1858

The Creditanstalt was founded in 1855 by Salomon Mayer von Rothschild and his son Anselm Salomon von Rothschild, with support from Austrian finance minister Karl Ludwig von Bruck and the financial involvement of notable figures of the Austrian and Bohemian high nobility. It was inspired by the Pereire brothers' Paris-based Crédit Mobilier (est. 1852), and represented a defensive move against the Pereires' aggressive expansion into Europe in competition with the long-established Rothschilds. The application presented to the Austrian imperial ministry guaranteed the initial capital subscription, with 40 percent taken by the Rothschild houses in Vienna, Frankfurt, and Paris, 50 percent by prominent aristocrats (Max Egon zu Fürstenberg, Johann Adolf II. zu Schwarzenberg, Vincenz Karl von Auersperg, Otto Ferdinand von Chotek, Louis Haber von Linsberg), and 10 percent by the private Prague banking house of Leopold von Lämel.

The Creditanstalt immediately became the leading bank in the Habsburg Monarchy. It opened its first branch in Prague in 1856. By 1867, it had established further branches in Pest, Brno, Brașov, Lviv, and Trieste, and on that year it sponsored a Hungarian affiliate, the Hungarian General Credit Bank, into which it subsequently merged its prior Pest branch. In 1869 it co-founded the Austro-Ägyptische Bank in Cairo, together with the Anglo-Austrian Bank. Albert Salomon Anselm von Rothschild, Anselm Salomon's son, took control of the Creditanstalt in 1872, and was in turn succeeded in 1911 by his son Louis Nathaniel de Rothschild.

The Creditanstalt's circumstances were dramatically affected by Austria-Hungary's defeat in the First World War, its subsequent dissolution, and the formation of the First Austrian Republic. In 1919, it had to sell its operations in what had become Czechoslovakia to the Prague-based Böhmische Escompte-Bank. In 1920, its branch in Ljubljana was reorganized as a fully-fledged Yugoslav bank, the Credit Institute for Commerce and Industry (Slovene: Kreditni zavod za trgovino in industrijo. It also sold its branches in the newly formed Poland to Akcyjny Bank Hipoteczny we Lwowie and Bank Dyskontowy Warszawski in an all-shares transaction, following which it held a third of each of the two banks' capital. Deprived of its international outlook, the Creditanstalt focused on the Austrian market. In 1926, it purchased the Viennese operations of the Anglo-Austrian Bank which had become a British bank following recapitalisation by the Bank of England; since that transaction was structured as an exchange of shares, the Bank of England, through its British subsidiary the Anglo-International Bank, became a significant shareholder of Creditanstalt. In 1929, just at the time of Wall Street crash and under pressure from the Austrian government led by Johann Schober, Creditanstalt purchased its distressed peer the Allgemeine Bodencreditanstalt, which itself was dragged down by its acquisition of Austria's Unionbank two years earlier.

== Downfall and merger ==
Burdened by the troubled legacy of its recent acquisitions, the Creditanstalt declared on 11 May 1931 that it was unable to publish its financial statements for 1930, immediately triggering panic. At that time, it represented 27 percent of the Austrian banking sector's total assets, a sum equivalent to 16 percent of the country's GDP, so that there was no option to have it absorbed by another larger banks as had been done with Unionbank in 1927 and Bodencreditanstalt in 1929. This was one of the first major bank collapses that initiated the Great Depression. Chancellor Otto Ender organized a rescue that entailed cost-sharing by the Austrian government, the Oesterreichische Nationalbank, and the Rothschild family, rejecting nationalization plans advocated by the Social Democratic Party. The group's foreign assets were transferred to a Monaco-registered entity, the Société Continentale de Gestion, of which Creditanstalt held of the share capital while its foreign creditors were awarded the other half. Creditanstalt's Yugoslav affiliate, the Ljubljana-based Credit Institute for Commerce and Industry, was acquired by the Ljubljana City Savings Bank, the Savings Bank of the Drava Banovina, and German-Slovenian businessman August Westen. The Creditanstalt's bankruptcy and its impact in producing a global banking crisis provided a major propaganda opportunity for Adolf Hitler and the Nazi Party in which they further blamed the Jews for German and international economic and social troubles.

In late 1933, Chancellor Engelbert Dollfuß ordered the Creditanstalt's merger with the Wiener Bankverein and the sound parts of the Niederösterreichische Escompte-Gesellschaft, as a consequence of which the bank became majority-owned by the government, while foreigners still held about 42 percent of the share capital. The merged entity took the name Österreichische Creditanstalt – Wiener Bankverein. By early 1938, the bank had branches in Bregenz, Feldkirch, Graz, Innsbruck, Klagenfurt, Leoben, Linz, Salzburg, Sankt Pölten, Villach, and Wiener Neustadt; controlling interests in Bank für Oberösterreich und Salzburg, Bank für Kärnten, Bank für Tirol und Vorarlberg, and Steiermärkische-Escompte-Bank; and minority stakes abroad in the former Wiener Bankverein affiliates in Poland and Yugoslavia as well as the Banque Franco-Belge et Balkanique in Bulgaria, plus a board representation in the Hungarian General Credit Bank.

== Anschluss and World War II ==
Following the Austrian Anschluss to Nazi Germany in 1938, the bank was immediately targeted for both financial and racial reasons. By that time, around 36 percent of its capital was held directly by the Austrian government, 12 percent by the Oesterreichische Nationalbank, 16 percent by the bank employees' pension fund, and 7 percent by the bank itself through its subsidiary österreichische Realitäten AG. On 26 March 1938 it was coerced to enter a "friendship agreement" with Deutsche Bank, by which the latter secured a presence in its board of directors. Louis de Rothschild was immediately arrested and imprisoned for the losses suffered by the Austrian state when the bank had collapsed. Deprived of his position and property, he was released upon payment of $21,000,000, believed to have been the largest bail bond in history for any individual, and migrated to the U.S. in 1939 after more than one year in custody.

Later in 1938, the bank was jointly taken over, without compensation, by German government holding VIAG, the Deutsche Bank, and the Reichsbank, which held respectively 51 percent, 25 percent, and 12 percent of its capital. In 1939, its name was abbreviated to Creditanstalt-Bankverein; the fiction of independence was maintained for propaganda purposes, but in practice the bank was run as a fully integrated operation of Deutsche Bank.

Following the annexation of the Sudetenland, the bank opened branches in Lundenburg (Břeclav), Nikolsburg (Mikulov) and Znaim (Znojmo), then in 1939 took over the former operations of Böhmische Union Bank in the newly formed Slovak Republic. Its Lviv-based affiliate the Akcyjny Bank Hipoteczny was nationalized following the Soviet invasion of Poland in September 1939, and later liquidated. In April 1942, Deutsche Bank raised its ownership to 51 percent by acquiring a block of shares from VIAG. During wartime, the Creditanstalt-Bankverein expanded its operations into Nazi-occupied Czechoslovakia, Poland, Yugoslavia, and in Nazi-allied Bulgaria. These included the formerly Bankverein-controlled Allgemeiner Jugoslawischer Bankverein (Belgrade and Zagreb) and Allgemeiner Bankverein in Polen (Warsaw), a minority interest in the Moravian Bank (Czech: Moravská banka) in Brno, and 30-percent stakes in the Böhmische Union Bank (Prague), Deutsch-Bulgarische Kreditbank (Sofia), and Banca Comercială Română (Bucharest).

Even though Josef Joham, its former head and still board member during the war, made contact with the U.S. Office of Strategic Services, the Creditanstalt in that period settled the financial issues of several Nazi concentration camps as well as the Aryanization of Jewish-owned businesses, like the re-establishment of Sascha-Film as Wien-Film Limited.

== Postwar development ==
Following Nazi defeat in World War II, the Creditanstalt again had to refocus its activity on Austria, and was nationalized by Allied-occupied Austria by law of 28 July 1946. By 1947 it had 23 branch offices in Vienna and 9 branches in the rest of Austria, as well as three provincial affiliates, namely the Bank für Kärnten in Klagenfurt, the Bank für Tirol und Vorarlberg in Innsbruck, and the Bank für Oberösterreich und Salzburg in Linz. It became mainly a commercial bank and was involved in Austria's economy, holding stakes in important Austrian companies such as Wienerberger, Steyr-Daimler-Puch, Lenzing AG, and Semperit. From 1956 onwards, the Creditanstalt was partly privatized by issuing 40% in shares, though only 10% in common stock. From the 1970s, it restarted an international expansion into Central and Eastern Europe. In 1975, it was the first Western bank to open a representative office in Budapest.

The Creditanstalt-Bankverein dedicated a memorial plaque to Antonio Vivaldi in 1978 on the occasion of his 300th birthday at the site of his former tomb at the main building of the TU Wien to the Karlskirche.

In 1981, the former Social Democratic Minister of Finance Hannes Androsch assumed the office of a general manager, after he had left the cabinet led by Bruno Kreisky. The bank's investments into industrial interests were reduced, while the government's ownership share fell to 51%. In the 1980s, the Creditanstalt opened branches in London, New York and Hong Kong. From 1989 onwards, its international orientation towards East-Central Europe was boosted by the fall of the Iron Curtain. In 1997, Geoffrey Hoguet ceased to work for the investment bank, the last member of the Rothschild family employed in banking in Austria by then.

== Merger with Bank Austria and aftermath ==
In 1997, the Austrian government sold its majority ownership stake in Creditanstalt to Bank Austria (BA), triggering a crisis in the ruling coalition between the Social Democratic Party and the Austrian People's Party – since the Creditanstalt was considered to be part of the Austrian People's Party's sphere of influence under the country's distinctive Proporz arrangement, whereas both of Bank Austria's predecessor entities, the Länderbank and the Viennese Zentralsparkasse, were associated with the political left. In 2001, Bank Austria in turn was acquired by Germany's HypoVereinsbank (HVB), which merged it with Creditanstalt in 2002 to create Bank Austria Creditanstalt (BA-CA). In 2005, HVB was taken over by Italy's UniCredit. After 153 years, the Creditanstalt brand name was finally phased out in 2008, even though it survived in a property subsidiary named CA Immo.

== Leadership ==
- Arie van Hengel, General Director 1932–1936
- Joseph Joham, General Director 1936–1938, Administrator 1945–1948, General Director 1948–1959
- Erich Miksch, General Director 1959–1970
- Heinrich Treichl, General Director 1970–1981
- Hannes Androsch, General Director 1981–1988
- Guido Schmidt-Chiari, General Director 1988–1997

== Buildings ==
=== Vienna ===
In 1855, the Creditanstalt was temporarily established at Renngasse 1 on Vienna's Freyung square. In 1858, it purchased and demolished a number of houses on am Hof square in central Vienna and replaced them with a new building designed by architect Franz Fröhlich, with allegorical sculptures by Hans Gasser representing Navigation, Railways, Commerce, Industry, Agriculture, and Mining. The building, numbered am Hof 6, was completed in 1860 and was kept in use by Creditanstalt until the 1934 merger. It was subsequently purchased by the Österreichischen Realitäten AG, a subsidiary of the Oesterreichische Nationalbank, and in 1940 by the Steierische Baugesellschaft. Am Hof 6 was damaged by allied bombing on 10 September 1944 and subsequently demolished. A new building was erected in its place in the early 1950s for electricity utility Verbundgesellschaft, designed by architect Carl Appel.

Between 1915 and 1921, the Creditanstalt had its head office expanded northwestward across Tiefer Graben street, on a land plot bordering the Freyung that it had purchased in 1914 from Niederösterreichische Escompte-Gesellschaft, which itself was moving from there to its new headquarters on am Hof 2. The opulent neoclassical extension, linked to the former seat by a bridge over Tiefer Graben, became the bank's main headquarters. It was designed by architects Ernst Gotthilf and Alexander Neumann; the same team had previously created the new head offices of Creditanstalt's competitors, the Wiener Bankverein (on Schottentor) and the Niederösterreichische Escompte-Gesellschaft itself (am Hof 2), both nearby locations. Following the 1934 merger, the building was purchased in 1937 by Österreichische Versicherungs-AG, an insurance company. By 1980 it was the property of the Länderbank which used it for its Länderbank Art Forum, successively renamed Bank Austria Art Forum (1991–2002), BA-CA Kunstforum (2002–2008), and, since 2008, again Bank Austria Art Forum Vienna. In 2010, it was acquired by financier René Benko, who repurposed its northwestern wing, which became the seat of the Austrian Constitutional Court in 2012, whereas the art forum has remained on the southeastern side.

In 1934, the Creditanstalt-Bankverein established its head office in the former seat of Wiener Bankverein at Schottentor. It remained there through the multiple mergers and restructurings until the late 2000s.

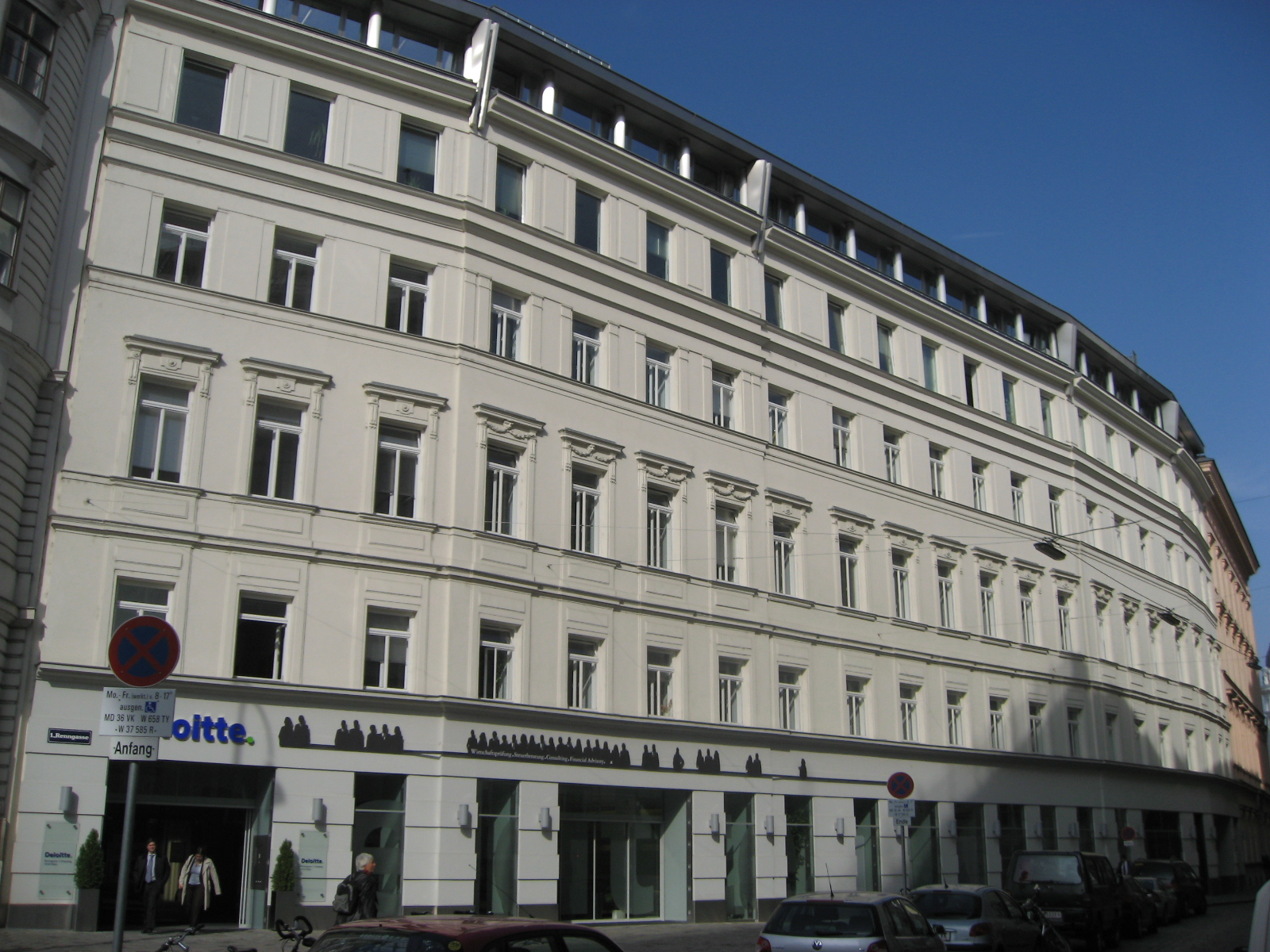
The Creditanstalt's first head office on Renngasse 1

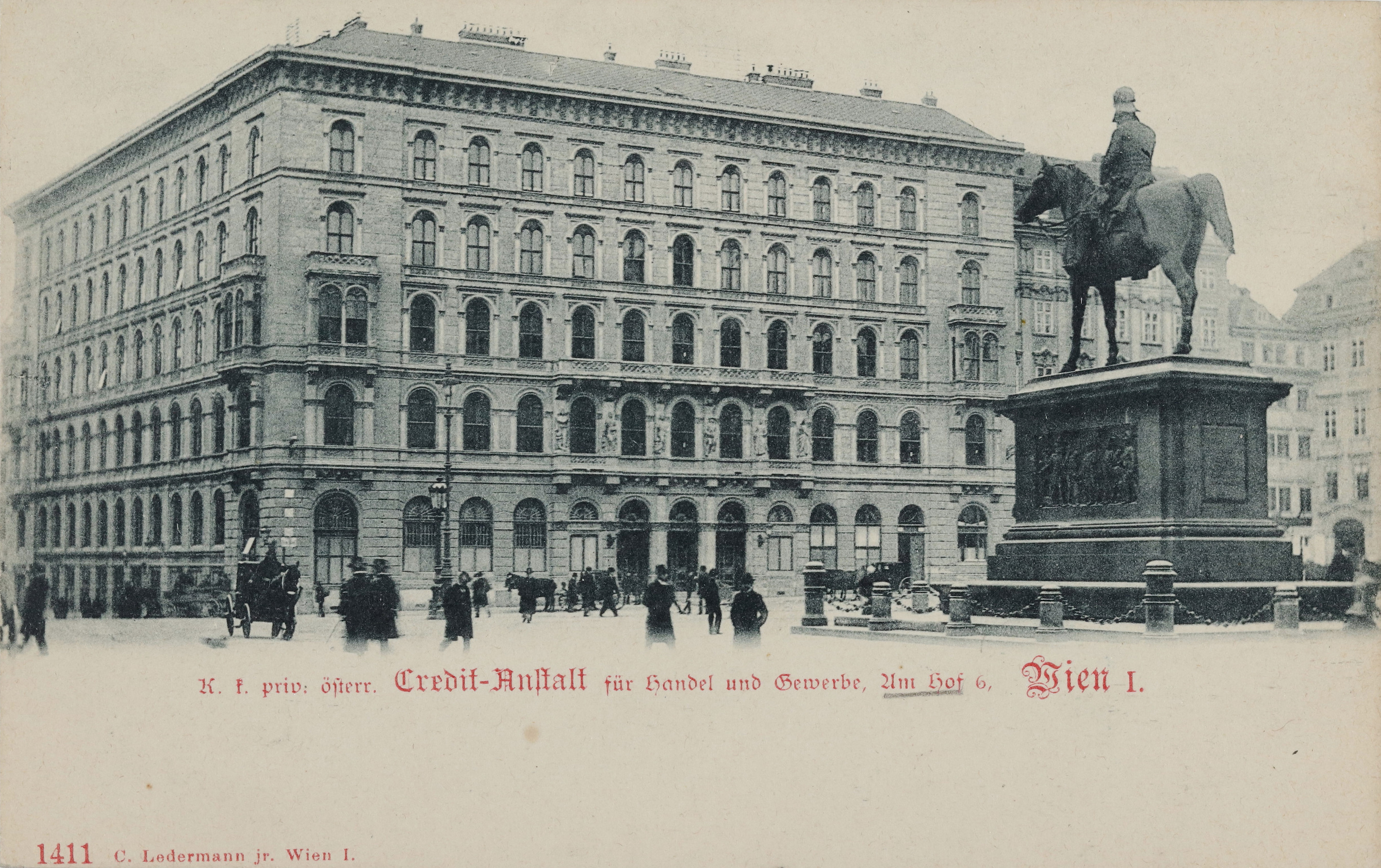
Head office building erected 1860, am Hof 6, photographed ca. 1900

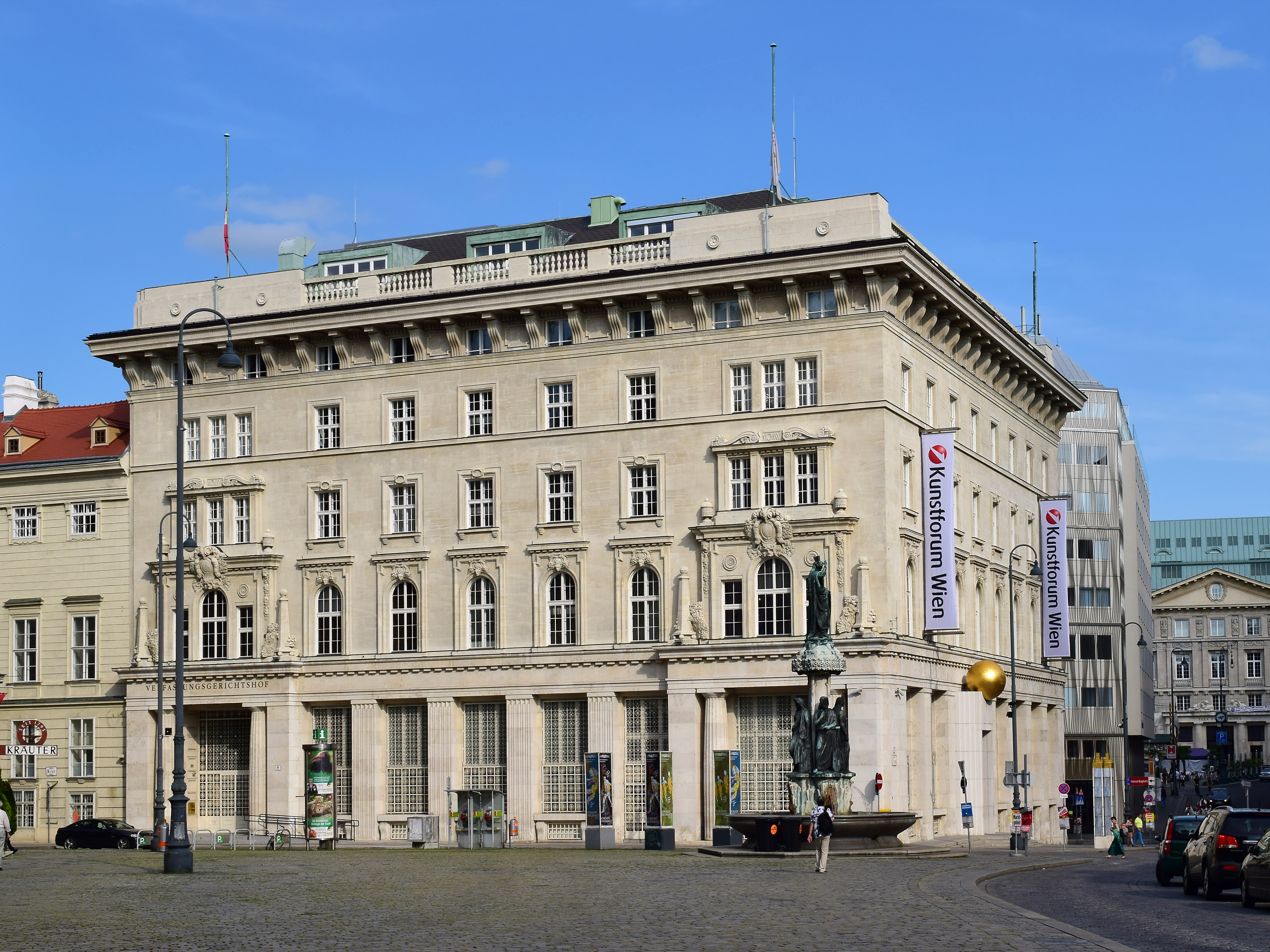
The 1910s extension in 2014, with the Austrian Constitutional Court on the left and Bank Austria Art Forum on the right

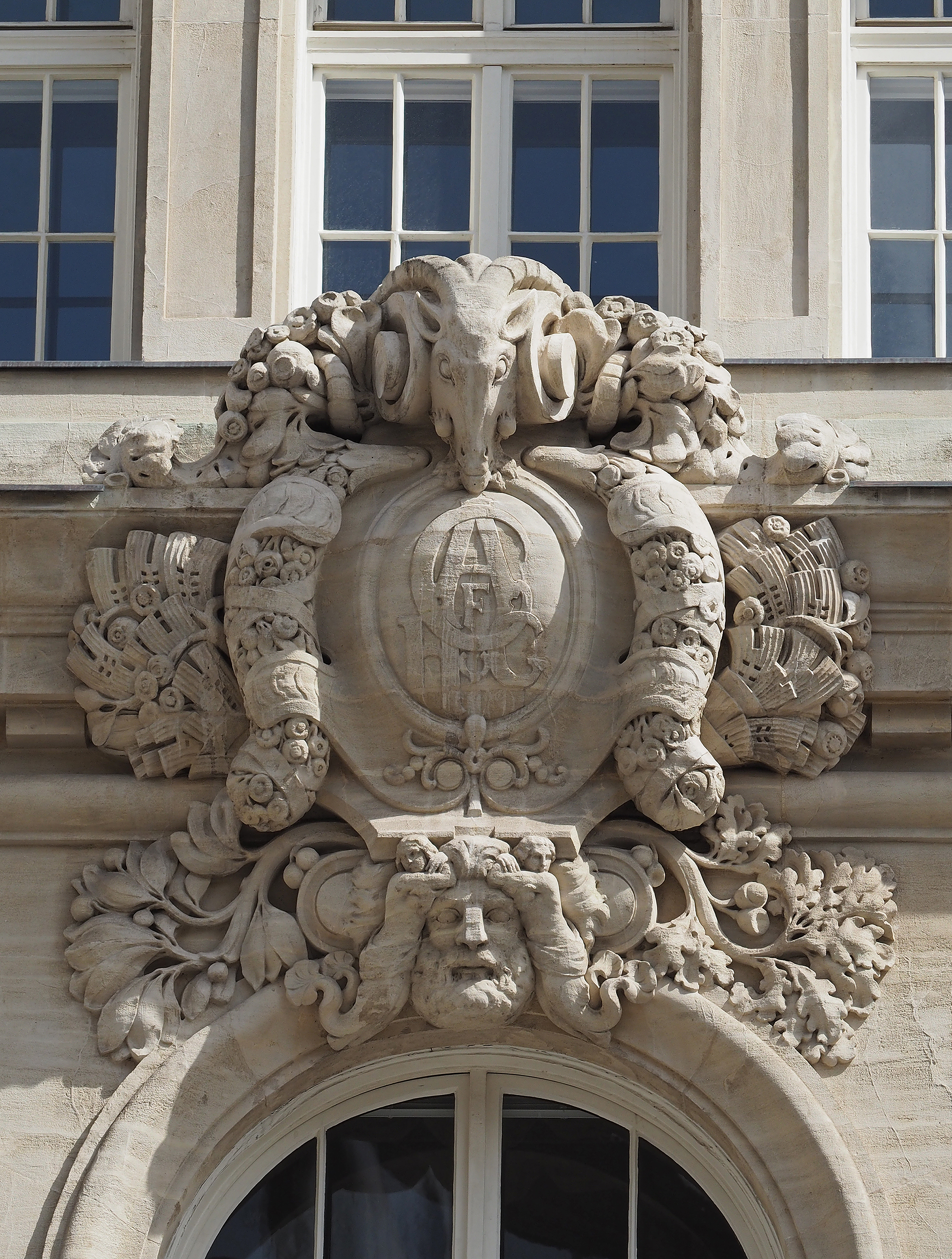
Monogram of the Creditanstalt ("CAfHuG" for Credit-Anstalt für Handel und Gewerbe) on the 1910s extension

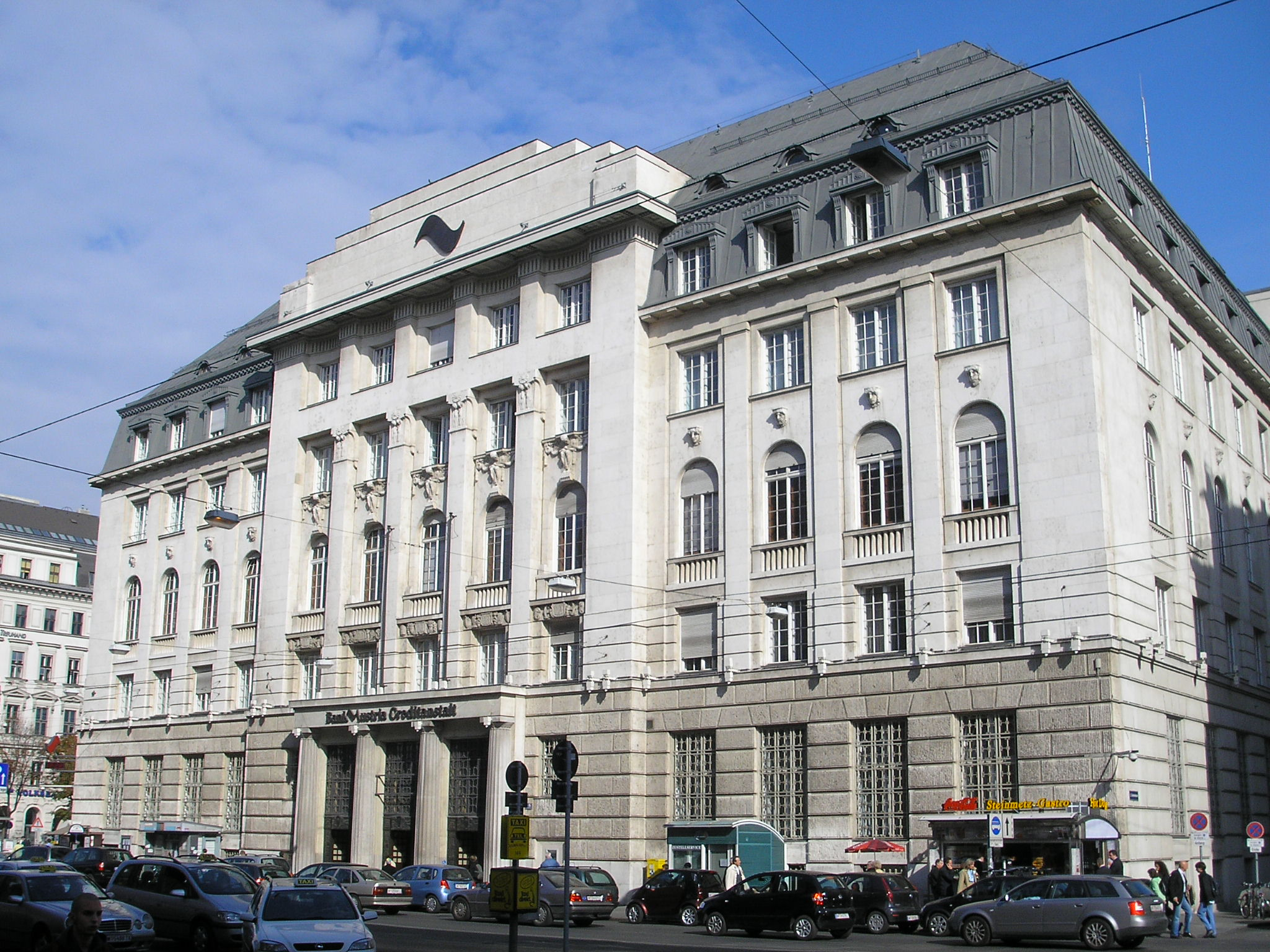
Former Wiener Bankverein seat at Schottentor, head office of Creditanstalt-Bankverein from 1934

=== Other locations ===
In 1894–1896, the Creditanstalt erected a new building for its branch in Prague, designed by architect Emil von Förster with sculptures by Antonín Popp. In 1907-1909 the Creditanstalt erected a monumental branch building in Trieste, on what later became Piazza della Repubblica.

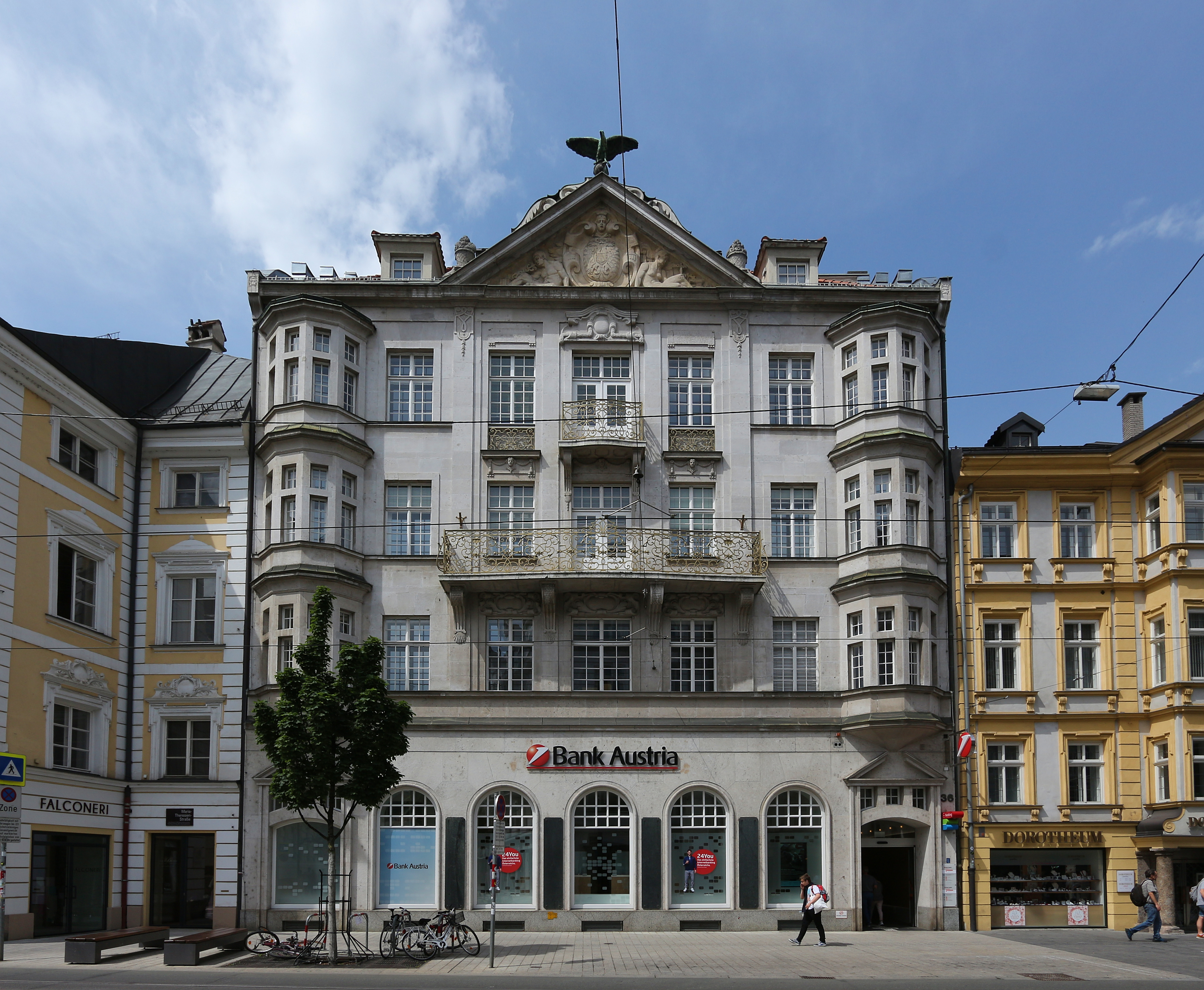
Branch building in Innsbruck, Maria-Theresien-Straße 36, in 2019

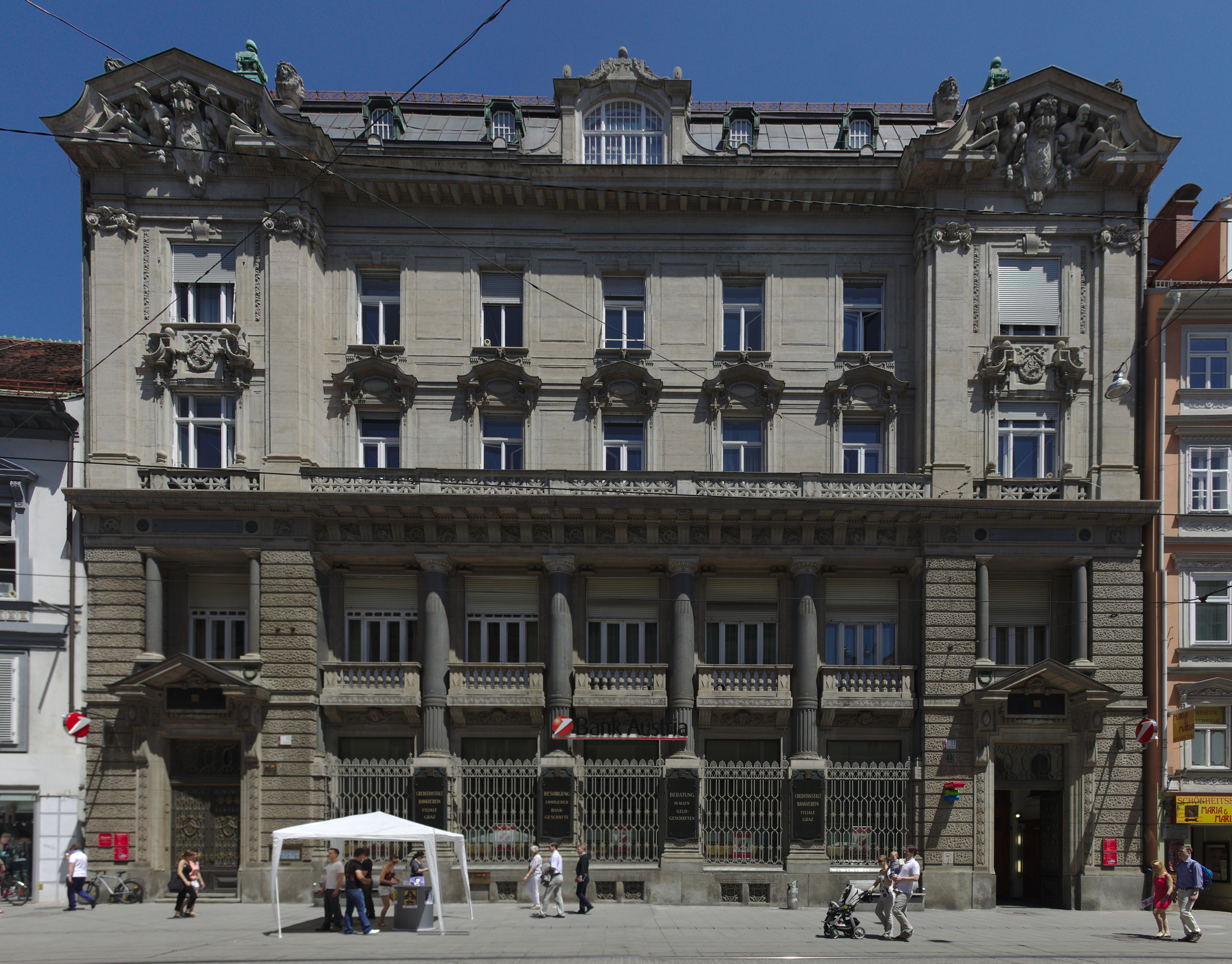
Branch building in Graz, Herrengasse 15, in 2014

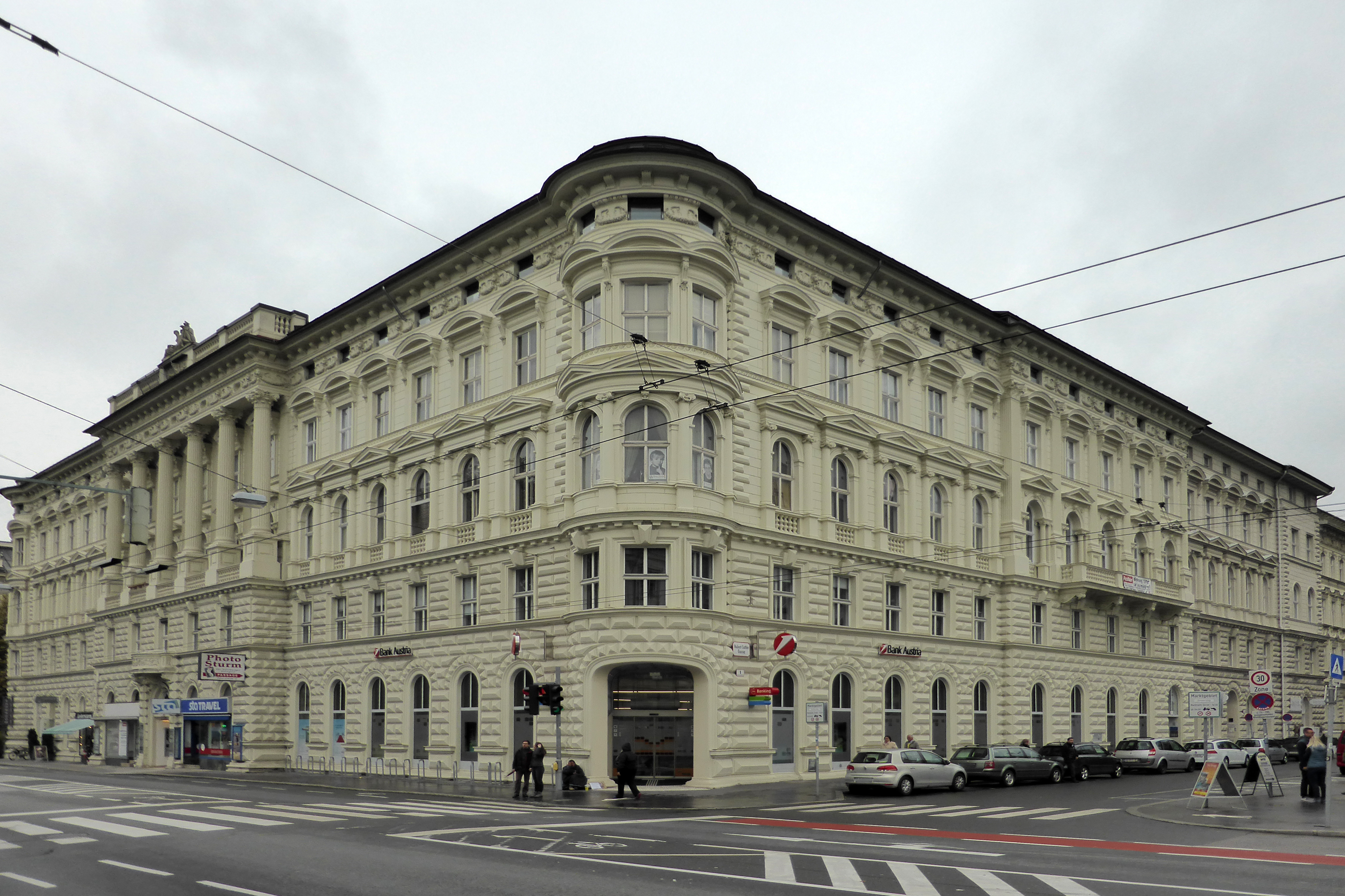
Branch building in Salzburg, Rainerstrasse 2, in 2016

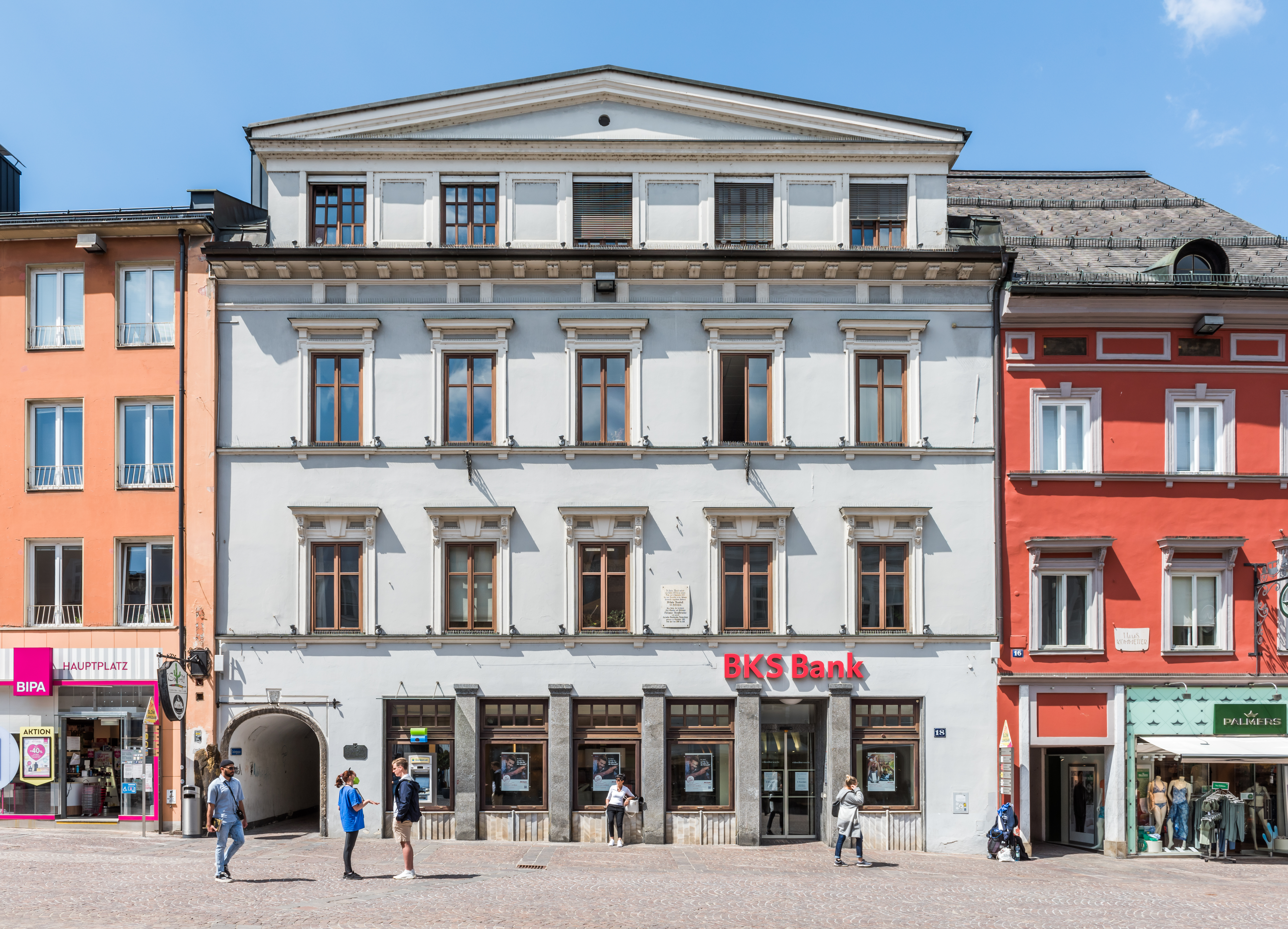
Branch building in Villach, Hauptplatz 18, in 2021

Former branch office in Prague, Na příkopě 8

== See also ==
- Wiener Bankverein
- Länderbank
- Anglo-Austrian Bank
- Erste Group
- List of banks in Austria
