= S. M. von Rothschild =

Banking enterprise established in 1820 in Vienna, Austria-Hungary

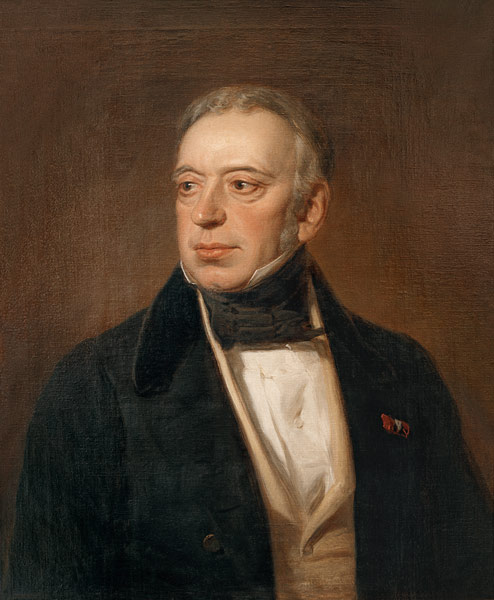
Salomon Mayer von Rothschild

S. M. von Rothschild was a banking enterprise established in 1820 in Vienna, Austrian Empire by Salomon Mayer Rothschild, the founder of the Rothschild banking family of Austria and a member of the Mayer Amschel Rothschild family of Frankfurt, Germany. The business prospered, financing various Austrian government undertakings where large amounts of capital had to be raised. The bank played a major role in the building of the country's economic infrastructure including the first rail transport networks. Passed down to Salomon Mayer Rothschild's male heirs, the bank would be run by Anselm von Rothschild (President: 1848–1874), Albert Salomon von Rothschild (President: 1874–1911), and Louis Nathaniel von Rothschild (President: 1911–1939).

The 13 March 1938 Anschluss of Austria to Nazi Germany marked the forced end of the Rothschild's business in Austria. Because he was Jewish, Baron Louis von Rothschild, head of the bank at the time, was held in prison for a year and only released after a substantial ransom was paid by his family. After Baron Louis was stripped of his Austrian citizenship and allowed to leave the country empty-handed, in March 1939 the Nazis placed the firm of S M von Rothschild under compulsory administration and then sold it to the German private bank Merck, Finck & Co. in October of that year, and S.M.v Rothschild became E.v. Nicolai & Co. After the Allies occupied Austria, Louis Rothschild asserted a claim to recover Südosttextil Gesellschaft m.b.H., a company that had been founded by E.v. Nicolai & Co. on January 29, 1942.

== See also ==
- de Rothschild Frères, Paris
- N M Rothschild & Sons, London
- List of banks in Austria
