= Albert Salomon Anselm von Rothschild =

Austro-Hungarian banker and art collector (1844–1911)

Albert von Rothschild
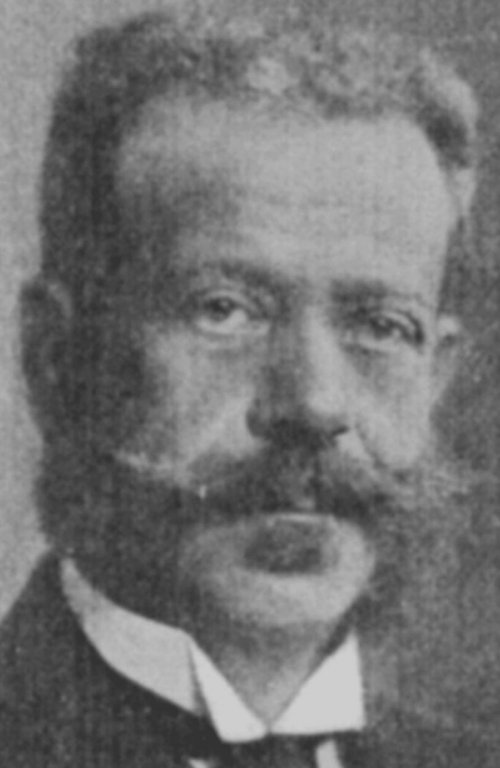
- Born: 29 October 1844; Vienna, Austrian Empire
- Died: 11 February 1911 (aged 66); Vienna, Austria-Hungary
- Resting place: Zentralfriedhof
- Occupation: Banker
- Known for: Austro-Hungarian monetary reform, Chess patron/player
- Board member of: S M von Rothschild, Northern Railway
- Spouse: Bettina Caroline de Rothschild (m. 1876; died 1892)
- Children: Georg von Rothschild; Alphonse de Rothschild; Charlotte von Rothschild; Ludwig de Rothschild; Eugène von Rothschild; Valentine von Rothschild; Oskar von Rothschild
- Parent(s): Anselm von Rothschild; Charlotte von Rothschild
- Honors: Iron Cross of Merit (1893); 719 Albert (1911)

Albert Salomon Anselm Freiherr von Rothschild (29 October 1844 – 11 February 1911) was a banker in Austria-Hungary and a member of the Rothschild banking family of Austria. Businesses that he owned included Creditanstalt and the Northern Railway.

== Early life ==
Rothschild was born in Vienna on 29 October 1844. He was the youngest son of Anselm von Rothschild (1803–1874) and Charlotte von Rothschild (1807–1859).

Known in the family as "Salbert", he was educated in Bonn.

== Career ==
After his father fell ill in 1866, Albert took over as head of the Rothschild family business in Austria. Upon his father's death in 1874, Albert's elder brothers Nathaniel and Ferdinand inherited most of their parent's real estate and art collection. The family business, however, passed to Albert including the S M von Rothschild bank, the single largest shareholding in the Creditanstalt, and the shares in the Northern Railway. After two generations in Austria, communications between his family and the Rothschilds in England had diminished considerably but Albert wisely reinstated the regular exchange of vital information on current economic matters and politics in their respective countries.

=== Art and residences ===
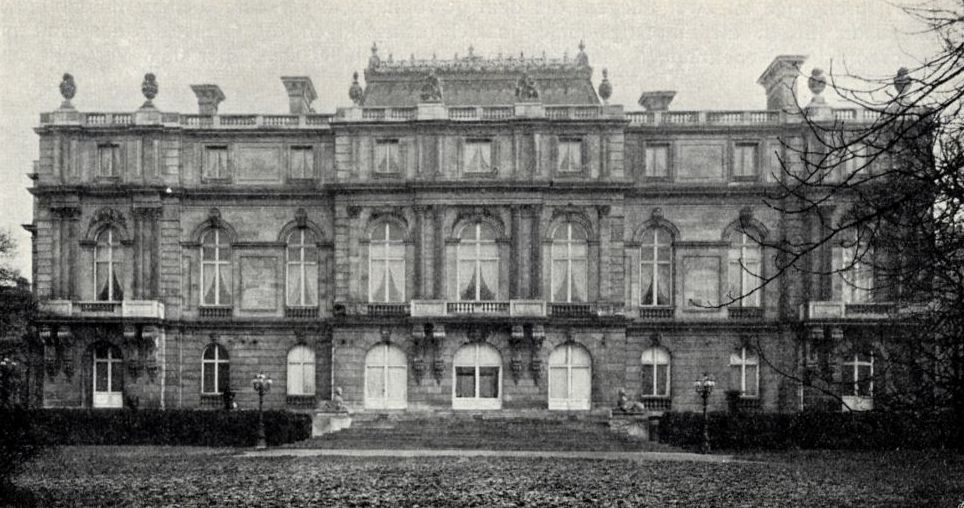
Palais Albert Rothschild, garden front, c. 1906

Rothschild owned several large properties including the Palais Albert Rothschild at Prinz-Eugen-Straße 20–22, in the 4th Wieden district of Vienna, designed by the French architect Gabriel-Hippolyte Destailleur and built between 1876 and 1882. When his unmarried and childless brother Nathaniel died in 1905, Albert inherited his Palais Nathaniel Rothschild at 14-16 Theresianumgasse in Vienna along with its large collection of art.

He also continued the family's involvement in the arts and with philanthropic projects. He was a chess patron who helped to finance the Vienna tournaments of 1873, 1882, 1898, 1903 (Gambit) and 1908. He was also President of the Vienna Chess Association 1872–1883 and a strong amateur player. He took a special interest in institutions that provided assistance to Jewish artists and musicians.

Albert was awarded the Iron Cross of Merit in 1893 for his role in Austro-Hungarian monetary reform.

== Personal life ==
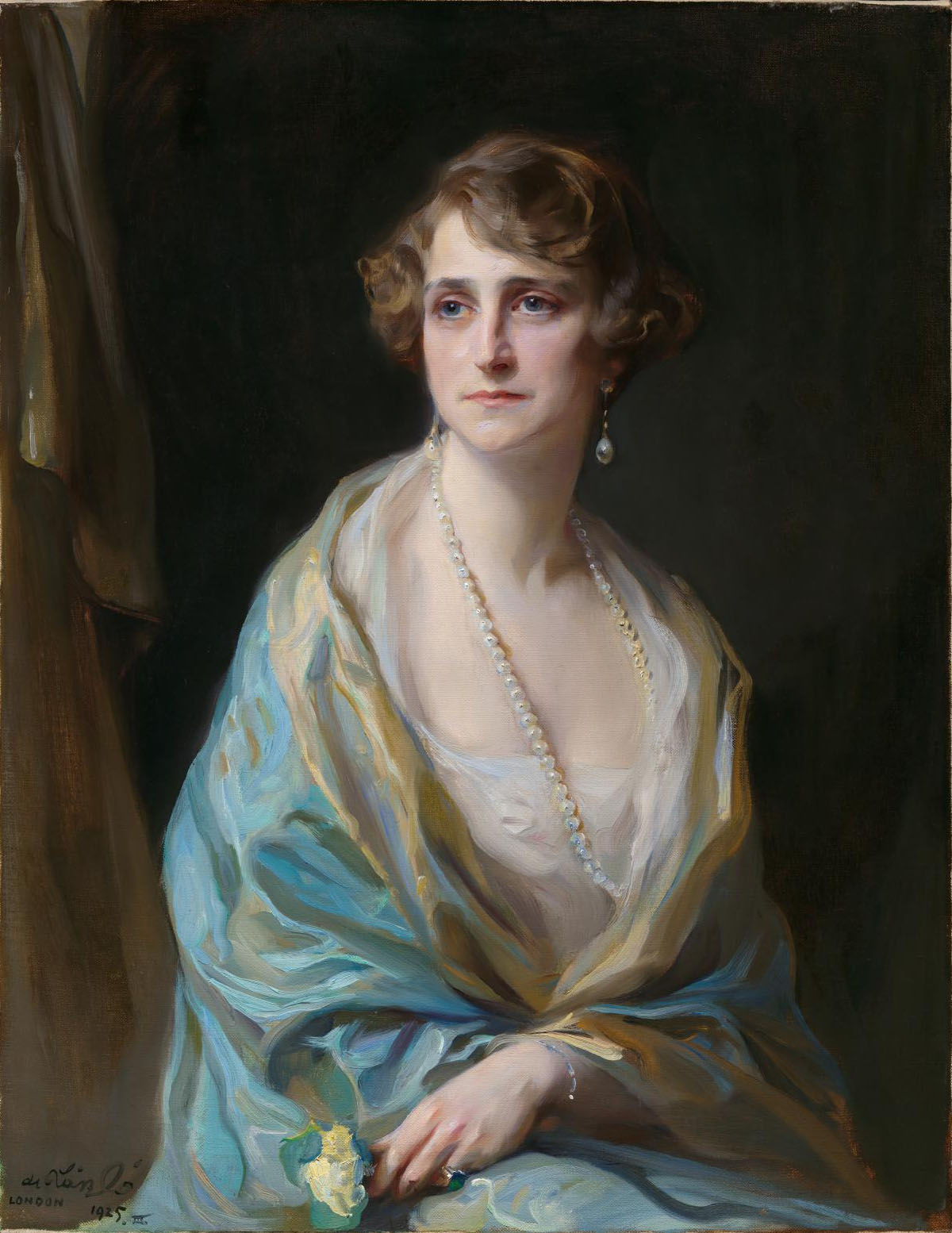
Portrait of his daughter-in-law, Clarice Sebag-Montefiore, by Philip de László, 1925

In 1876, Rothschild married his second cousin Baroness Bettina Caroline de Rothschild (1858–1892) of Paris, France, daughter of Alphonse James de Rothschild. Before her death in 1892, they were the parents of seven children:

- Georg Anselm Alphonse von Rothschild (1877–1934), who never married and died in a private mental hospital.
- Alphonse Meyer de Rothschild (1878–1942), who married Englishwoman Clarice Sebag-Montefiore, in 1912.
- Charlotte Esther von Rothschild (1879–1885), who died young.
- Ludwig Nathaniel von Rothschild (1882–1955), who married Countess Hildegarde Karoline Johanna Maria von Auersperg in 1946.
- Eugène Daniel von Rothschild (1884–1976), who married the American divorcee, Countess Erwein von Schönborn-Buchheim (née Catherine "Kitty" Wolf, formerly Mrs. Dandridge Spotswood), in 1925. After her death in 1946, he married actress Jeanne Stuart in 1952.
- Valentine Noémi von Rothschild (1886–1969), who married Baron Sigismund von Springer.
- Oskar von Rothschild (1888–1909), who never married and committed suicide at age 21.

In December 1887, Albert and his wife were given the right to be presented at Court, the first time such a privilege had been granted in Austria to Jews.

Rothschild died in Vienna on 11 February 1911 and was interred next to his wife and their six-year-old daughter Charlotte in the city's Zentralfriedhof. His eldest son, Georg, and youngest son, Oskar, were also buried in the Zentralfriedhof.

=== Legacy ===
Following his wife's death in 1892 at the age of thirty-four, Rothschild donated 500,000 guilders to build the Bettina Frauenspital (Bettina Hospital for Women) in her memory and a Bettina Rothschild begonia was named for her. The Austrian astronomer Johann Palisa named the large Main belt asteroid he discovered in 1885 the 250 Bettina in her honor as a benefactor of the Vienna Observatory.

In recognition of Albert von Rothschild's years of financial support, the 719 Albert Amor asteroid was named in his memory by astronomer Johann Palisa.

== See also ==
- Rothschild banking family of Austria
