= Rothschild Hospital =

Hospital in Währinger Gürtel, Vienna, Austria

- Israelitische Kultusgemeinde in Vienna
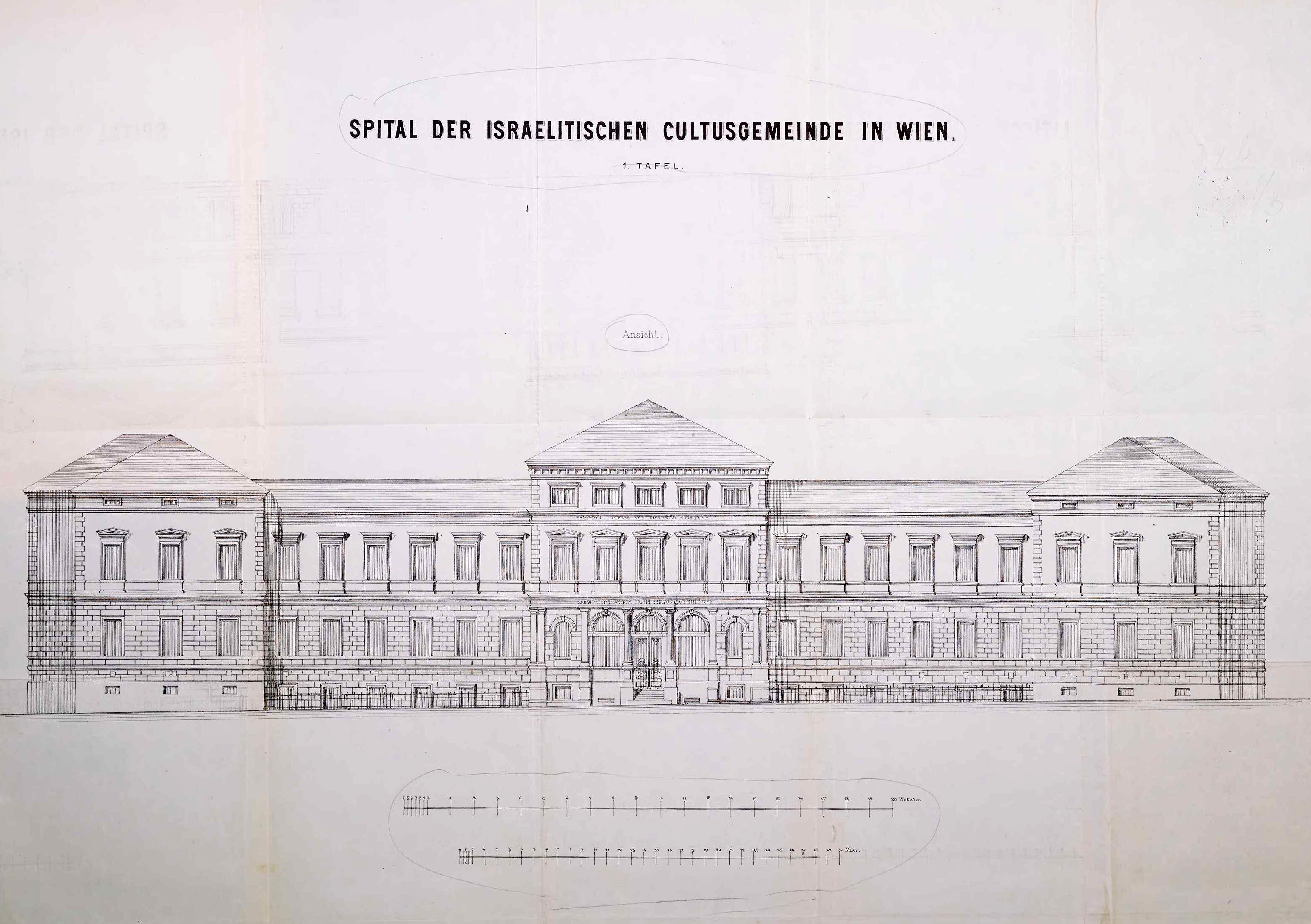
- 1873 drawing of the hospital

Geography
- Location: Währinger Gürtel 97, Vienna
- Coordinates: 48°13′34″N 16°20′56″E

Organisation
- Patron: Baron Anselm von Rothschild

History
- Opened: 1873
- Closed: 1943
- Demolished: 1960

The Rothschild Hospital, named after its founder Baron Anselm von Rothschild, was the hospital of the Israelitische Kultusgemeinde in Vienna, in the Austro-Hungarian Empire, later Austria, and ultimately the German Third Reich, which opened in 1873 and was closed by the Nazis in 1943. After World War II, it served as a hospital for sick and infirm displaced persons, housing as many as 600 refugees.

The building on Währinger Gürtel 97, built by the architect Wilhelm Stiassny, was demolished in 1960 and replaced by a new building which houses the Chamber of Commerce's "WIFI University" (Wirtschaftsförderungsinstitut), which offers courses and certificates and degrees in economy-related fields (including languages and social sciences).

== Early development ==
The original hospital was established in 1852 by James de Rothschild as part of his philanthropic activities in Paris. Located at 76 Rue de Picpus, it initially functioned as both a hospital and a hospice for elderly members of the city's Jewish community. Between 1852 and 1860, the institution accommodated approximately 8,000 patients, with the number of patients continuing to increase during the following decades.

The activities of the Rothschild family's foundation were expanded in 1904 by James de Rothschild's sons Alphonse, Gustave and Edmond. Edmond subsequently provided funding for the reconstruction and expansion of the hospital. Between 1912 and 1914, a new hospital complex was built on Rue Santerre to designs by the French architect Lucien Bechmann.

During the First World War, the institution was designated an auxiliary military hospital and treated both wounded soldiers from the Western Front and civilian casualties, regardless of their religious background.

== Public hospital ==
On 1 January 1954, after approximately forty years of private management at the Rue Santerre site, the hospital was transferred to the Assistance Publique for the symbolic price of one French franc.

The hospital subsequently underwent several phases of modernisation. A new surgical building opened in 1971, followed by laboratory facilities in 1975, a medical building in 1979 and a social-services building in 1981.

In the 21st century, the hospital's activities have increasingly focused on geriatrics, physical medicine and rehabilitation, neurological and orthopaedic rehabilitation, and dentistry. It forms part of the Assistance Publique–Hôpitaux de Paris university hospital system in the Île-de-France region.
