= 250 Bettina =

Main-belt asteroid

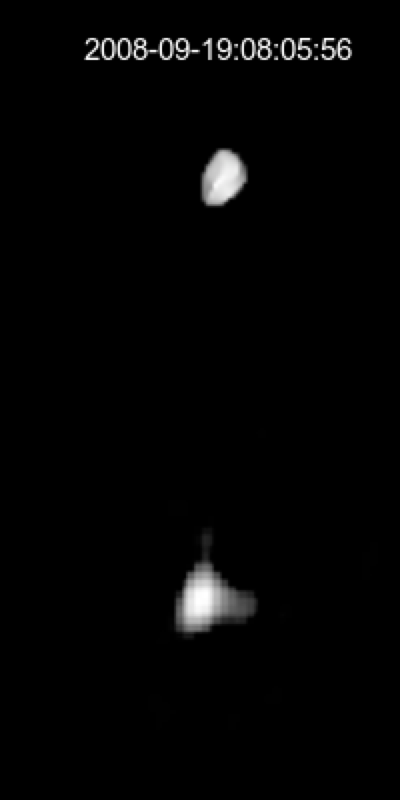
- Lightcurve-based 3D model of Bettina on the top with an image of the asteroid on the bottom

Discovery
- Discovered by: Johann Palisa
- Discovery date: 3 September 1885

Designations
- Pronunciation: German: [bɛˈtiːnaː]
- Alternative designations: A885 RA
- Minor planet category: Main belt

Orbital characteristics
- Epoch 31 July 2016 (JD 2457600.5)
- Uncertainty parameter 0
- Observation arc: 130.62 yr (47710 d)
- Aphelion: 3.5657 AU (533.42 Gm)
- Perihelion: 2.7325 AU (408.78 Gm)
- Semi-major axis: 3.14906 AU (471.093 Gm)
- Eccentricity: 0.13229
- Orbital period (sidereal): 5.59 yr (2041.1 d)
- Average orbital speed: 16.78 km/s
- Mean anomaly: 56.902°
- Mean motion: 0° 10^{m} 34.932^{s} / day
- Inclination: 12.819°
- Longitude of ascending node: 23.862°
- Argument of perihelion: 76.692°

Physical characteristics
- Mean diameter: 109±5 km
- Mass: (2.389 ± 1.157/0.547)×10^{18} kg (1.92±0.49)×10^{18} kg (Note: Calculated from its standard gravitational parameter GM = 0.128±0.033 km^{3}/s^{2}.)
- Mean density: 3.524 ± 1.707/0.806 g/cm^{3} 2.83±0.83 g/cm^{3}
- Synodic rotation period: 5.054414 h (0.2106006 d)
- Pole ecliptic longitude: 101° ± 2°
- Pole ecliptic latitude: 9° ± 2°
- Geometric albedo: 0.112±0.019
- Spectral type: M
- Absolute magnitude (H): 7.72

250 Bettina is a large main belt asteroid that was discovered by Austrian astronomer Johann Palisa on September 3, 1885, in Vienna. It was named in honour of Baroness Bettina von Rothschild (née de Rothschild; 1858–1892), wife of Baron Albert von Rothschild who had bought the naming rights for £50. Based upon the spectrum, it is classified as an M-type asteroid.

In 1988, the asteroid was observed from the Collurania-Teramo Observatory, allowing a light curve to be produced that showed "an irregular behavior with a deeper minimum and a narrower maximum". The data showed a rotation period of 5.055 hours and a brightness variation of 0.17 ± 0.01 in magnitude. The ratio of the lengths of the major to minor axes for this asteroid were found to be 1.51 ± 0.03.
