= Louis Nathaniel de Rothschild =

Austrian baron

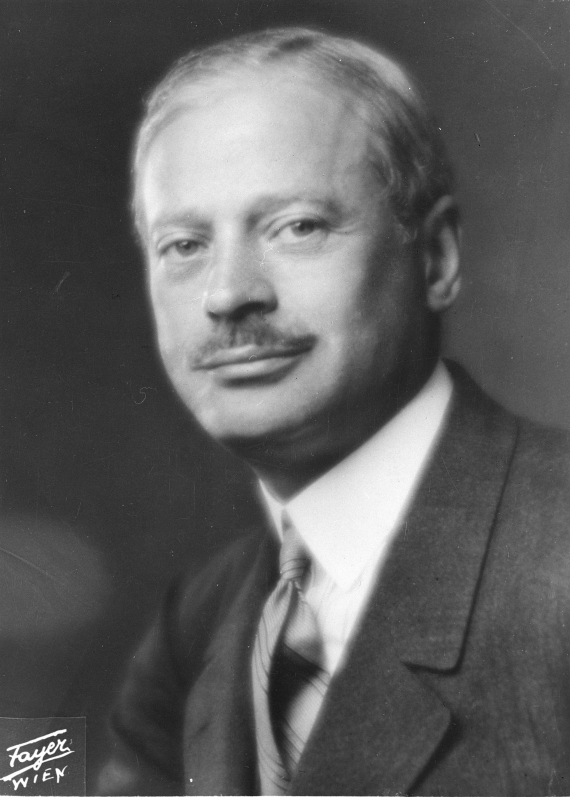
- Photograph of Rothschild, c. 1930
- Born: Ludwig Nathaniel Freiherr von Rothschild; 5 March 1882; Vienna, Austria-Hungary
- Died: 15 January 1955 (aged 72); Montego Bay, Jamaica
- Occupation: Banker
- Spouse: Countess Hilda von Auersperg (m. 1946; died 1955)
- Parent(s): Albert Salomon von Rothschild and Bettina Caroline de Rothschild

Louis Nathaniel, Baron von Schwartz de Rothschild (German: Ludwig Nathaniel, Freiherr von Rothschild) was an Austrian Baron from the Rothschild family.

== Early life ==
Rothschild was born in Vienna on 5 March 1882. He was the son of Baron Albert Salomon Anselm von Rothschild (1844–1911) and his wife, Bettina Caroline de Rothschild (1858–1892). His father owned numerous palaces in Vienna, including the Palais Albert Rothschild, that housed exquisite art collections and antiques.

== Career ==
After the death of his father, Albert Rothschild, in 1911, he took over the management of the Creditanstalt bank and industrial companies owned by the Austrian branch of the Rothschilds.

=== Held for ransom by Nazis ===
After the Anschluß of Austria to Nazi Germany in March 1938, he was arrested at the airport at Aspern and held by the German Government. He was released only after lengthy negotiations between the family and German officials and upon payment of 21 million dollars (equivalent to $480,319,149 in 2025), believed to have been the largest kidnap ransom in history for any individual.

While imprisoned he was visited by Heinrich Himmler. Rothschild apparently impressed the SS leader, who subsequently ordered that Rothschild's prison conditions be improved with better furniture and sanitation facilities. Despite appeals from Queen Mary of the United Kingdom and possibly the Duke of Windsor, Rothschild was held in Vienna's Hotel Metropole while the German government attempted to expropriate his business concerns. He was imprisoned at least through July 1938, and his property placed under control of a German commissioner. In his memoirs, Felix Somary recalls that, soon before the Anschluss, he phoned to the baron repeatedly, in a desperate attempt to convince him to leave Austria. The day before the Anschluss, Louis's brother Alphons and his wife were visiting him in Switzerland, wanting to go back into Austria; he persuaded them to remain there, and to get his children Francesca de Rothschild and Heidi de Rothschild away from Austria to the Netherlands.

Finally allowed to leave Austria, Louis survived the Holocaust and Second World War.

=== Aryanisations and seizures ===
All of the Rothschild possessions were seized and subsequently "Aryanised". The city-palace of the family was destroyed after the war. The baron never received most of his former belongings back, since most of the paintings were taken over by the Austrian state, which did not allow the paintings to leave the country. In 1998, over 200 art works were returned to the Rothschild heirs by the Austrian Government, and were placed at Christie's in London for auction in 1999.

In 2020, in one of the largest ever restitution claims filed, Rothschild heirs sued Vienna over a trust seized by the Germans.

== Personal life ==
In 1946 he married the Countess Hildegarde Karoline Johanna Maria "Hilda" von Auersperg (1895–1981), the only daughter of Count Anton von Auersperg (1858-1924) and his wife, Valerie Schenk von Lédecz (1875-1931). They lived in East Barnard, Vermont in the United States, and in England. They did not have any children.

Rothschild died of heart failure while swimming in Montego Bay, Jamaica on 15 January 1955.

== See also ==
- Aryanization
- Anschluss
- The Holocaust in Austria
- Hitler's Führermuseum in Linz
- Rothschild family
