= Salomon Mayer von Rothschild =

German-born banker in Austria

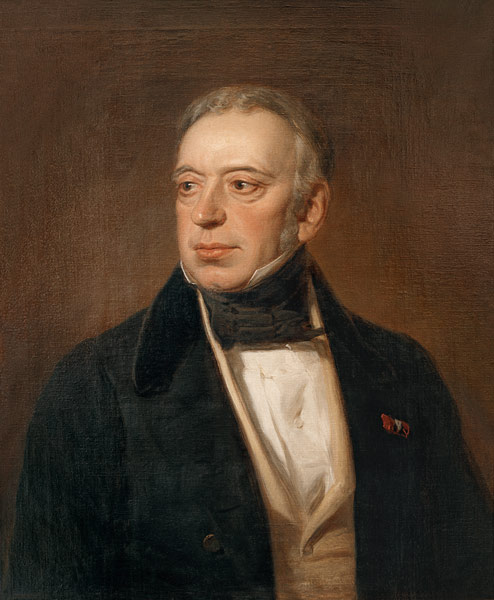
- Born: Salomon Mayer Rothschild; 9 September 1774; Frankfurt, Holy Roman Empire
- Died: 28 July 1855 (aged 80); Paris, French Empire
- Occupations: Banker, art collector, philanthropist
- Title: Freiherr
- Board member of: S M von Rothschild de Rothschild Frères
- Spouse: Caroline Stern
- Children: Anselm von Rothschild; Betty von Rothschild
- Parent(s): Mayer Amschel Rothschild; Gutlé Schnapper

Salomon Mayer Freiherr von Rothschild (9 September 1774 – 28 July 1855) was a Frankfurt-born banker in the Austrian Empire and the founder of the Austrian branch of the prominent Rothschild family.

== Family ==
Born as Salomon Mayer Rothschild in Frankfurt am Main, he was the third child and second son of Mayer Amschel Rothschild (1744–1812) and his wife, Gutlé Schnapper (1753–1849).

In 1800, he married Caroline Stern (1782–1854). They had the following children:

1. Anselm von Rothschild (1803–1874), who married his cousin Charlotte Nathan Rothschild in 1826.
2. Betty von Rothschild (1805–1886), who married her uncle James Mayer de Rothschild in 1824.

His father had built a hugely prosperous banking business in Germany. Wanting to expand the family business across Europe, the eldest Rothschild son remained in Frankfurt, while each of the other four sons were sent to different European cities to establish a banking branch. Salomon was made a shareholder of the de Rothschild Frères bank when it was opened in Paris by his brother James Mayer de Rothschild in 1817.

In 1824, Salomon's daughter Betty married her uncle James Mayer de Rothschild, head of the Paris bank. Endogamy was a centuries-old Jewish tradition and talmudic rule, not an exception as it was among Christians. Although modern historians try to justify and explain Jewish endogamy as a part of the Rothschild family's strategy to keep control of their business in family hands, endogamy was a common practice among the poor Jews as well.

== Career ==
Trained in finance and with years of experience, Salomon was sent in 1820 to Austria to formalize the family's existing involvements in financing Austrian government projects. In 1821, he established S M von Rothschild in Vienna. The business financed the Nordbahn rail transport network, Austria's first steam railway, and also funded various government undertakings where large amounts of capital had to be raised. He made connections amongst the country's aristocracy and its political elite through Prince Klemens von Metternich and Friedrich von Gentz.

Under the direction of Salomon, the Viennese bank was highly successful, playing an integral role in the development of the Austrian economy. In recognition of his services, he was raised to the Austrian nobility in 1816 by Emperor Francis I, the patent being offered to all five brothers, although declined by Nathan Mayer Rothschild.

In 1822, Salomon von Rothschild, along with his four brothers, was further honoured when the Emperor awarded him the hereditary title of Freiherr (German for 'Baron'). In 1843, Salomon Freiherr von Rothschild became the first Jew to ever be given honorary Austrian citizenship.

Salomon's personal wealth was enormous, and he acquired extensive properties and made investments in art and antiquities. His main business rival was Georg Simon von Sina. Despite the fact that he made substantial contributions to philanthropic causes, the concentration of vast wealth by the few members of the Austrian elite resulted in a growing civil unrest in the country.

By the time of the revolutions of 1848 in the Habsburg areas, anti-Rothschild sentiments were frequently voiced and written about in broadsheets such as Ein offener Brief an Rothschild. With the fall of Metternich, Salomon lost some of his political clout and his bank a considerable amount of money.

Under pressure, the 74-year-old handed over the reins of the bank to his son Anselm, but it was not without rancor. He left Vienna and retired to Paris, where he died in 1855.

From his art collection, some of the objets d'art from the Italian and French Renaissance, together with 18th-century works, were donated to the Louvre, including two paintings by Carlo Dolci.

== See also ==
- Rothschild banking family of England
- Rothschild banking family of France
- Rothschild banking family of Naples
