= Leopold Oser =

Austrian gastroenterologist (1839–1910)

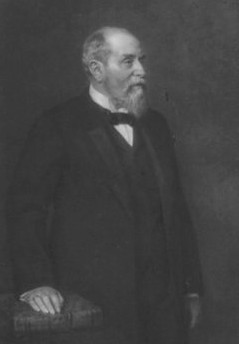
- Born: 27 July 1839; Mikulov, Moravia, Austrian Empire
- Died: 22 August 1910 (aged 71); Gainfarn, Vienna, Austria-Hungary
- Education: University of Vienna
- Scientific career
- Fields: Gastroenterology
- Workplaces: Vienna General Hospital

Leopold (Löb) Oser (27 July 1839 – 22 August 1910) was an Austrian physician. He was a full professor at the University of Vienna, and – alongside Carl Anton Ewald from Berlin – was the first doctor to use a soft stomach tube instead of a rigid tube for gastroscopy.

== About ==
=== Early life ===
Leopold Oser was the son of textile merchant Hermann Hirsch Oser and Amalia Maly Milka, née Pisk. From 1856 to 1861, Oser studied medicine at the University of Vienna. In 1862, he received his doctorate in medicine and surgery and received the Magister obstetricis (obstetrician). He then worked at the Institute for Experimental Pathology under Salomon Stricker. He was a student of Josef von Škoda and Johann Ritter von Oppolzer, the founders of holistic diagnosis and therapy at the Second Vienna Medical School. Oser married Amélie (Chaya; née Hirsch, 1852–1933), daughter of the Viennese art dealer Leopold Hirsch and Katharina Hirsch. He had five sisters (Julie, Josefine, Karoline, Therese and Regine), and four brothers (Adolf, Sigmund, Ludwig and Bernhard). In various newspaper articles it was reported that the couple in Vienna led a lively social life. According to Oser's obituary, they had no children.

=== Later life ===
In 1909, Oser's 70th birthday was celebrated at the Rothschild Hospital in the presence of Governor Erich von Kielmansegg and founder Albert Rothschild. He received a crown pension of 20,000 Austro-Hungarian krones, which he donated to the Jewish Community of Vienna to support young doctors. He died the following year. His last words are said to be:

Don't forget my poor sick!

which were immortalized on his tombstone in the Wiener Zentralfriedhof. A blessing in the Hebrew language ("His soul be bound into the bundle of life!"), abbreviated ת נ צ ב ה, concludes the inscription. The Illustriertes Oesterreichisches Journal ('Illustrated Austrian Journal') wrote on the occasion of his death:

His urban, unaffected nature and his efforts to encourage students have given him immortalized sympathy. The sick, to whom he was always a helpful comforter in his kind heart, adored him.

== Career ==
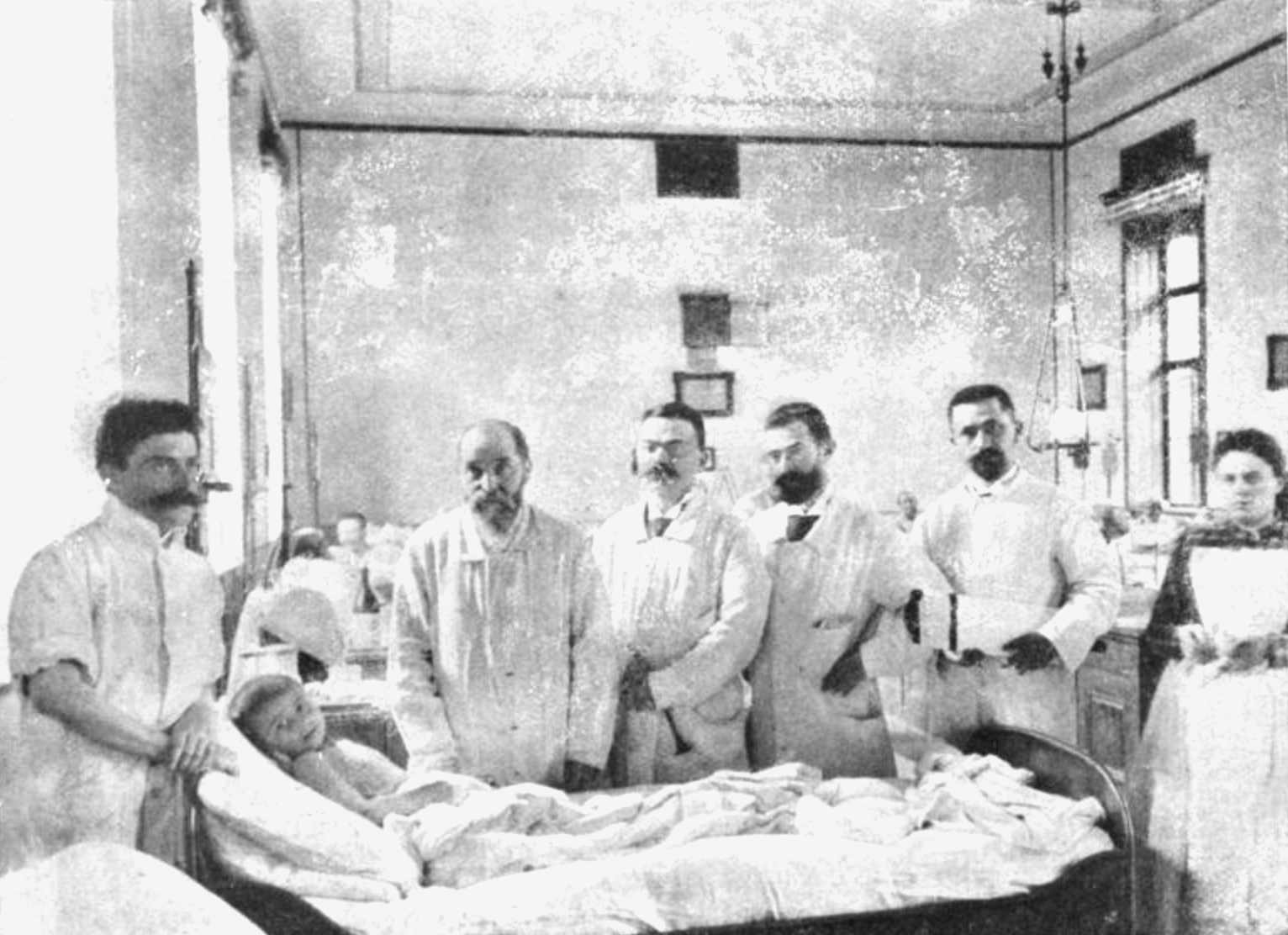
Leopold Oser (second from left) during a medical visit, 1906

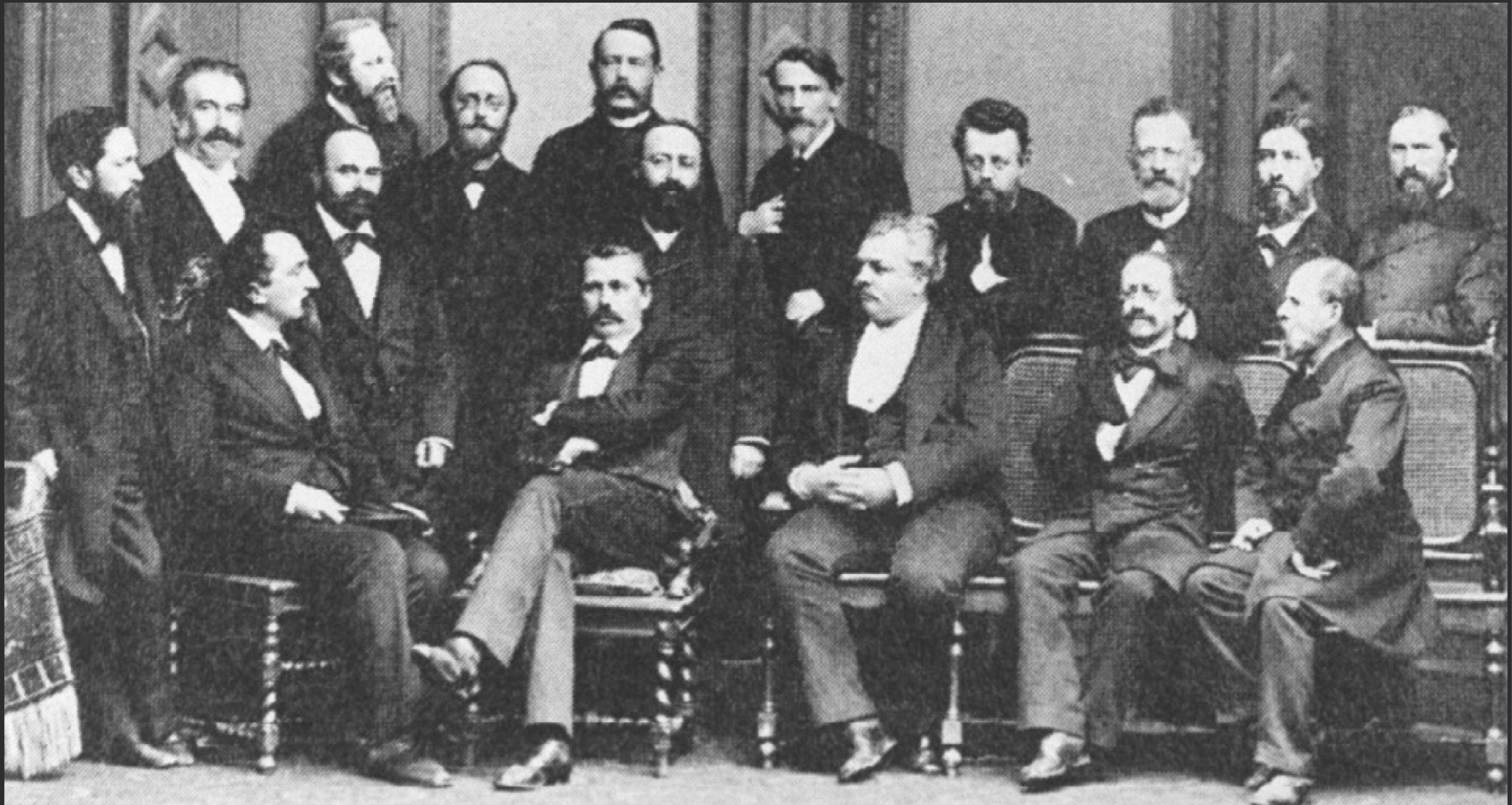
The department heads of the General Polyclinic in Vienna around 1885. From left, seated: Alois Monti, Johann Schnitzler, Robert Ultzmann, Jakob Hock, Samuel Siegfried Karl von Basch; Standing from left:August Leopold von Reuss, Emil Stoffella, Wilhelm Winternitz, Leopold Oser, Anton von Frisch, Hans von Hebra, Ludwig Fürth, Moriz Benedikt, Viktor Urbantschitsch, Max Herz, Anton Wölfler, Ludwig Bandl

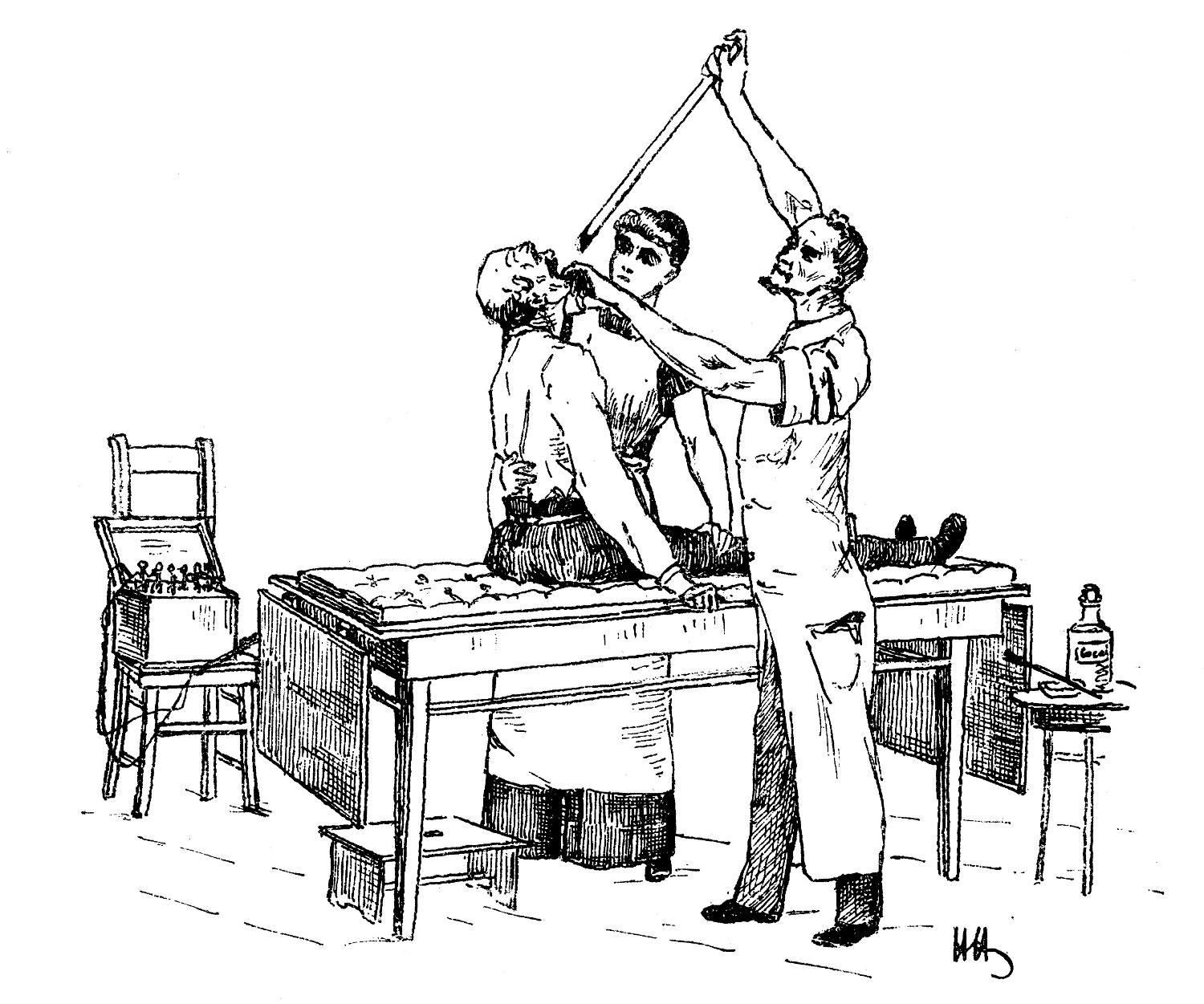
Gastroscopy / esophagoscopy with a rigid tube in 1896, despite the introduction of a flexible gastric tube by Oser in 1875. About the technique of esophagoscopy, Wiener Klin. Weekly journal (No. 6 and 7, 1896)

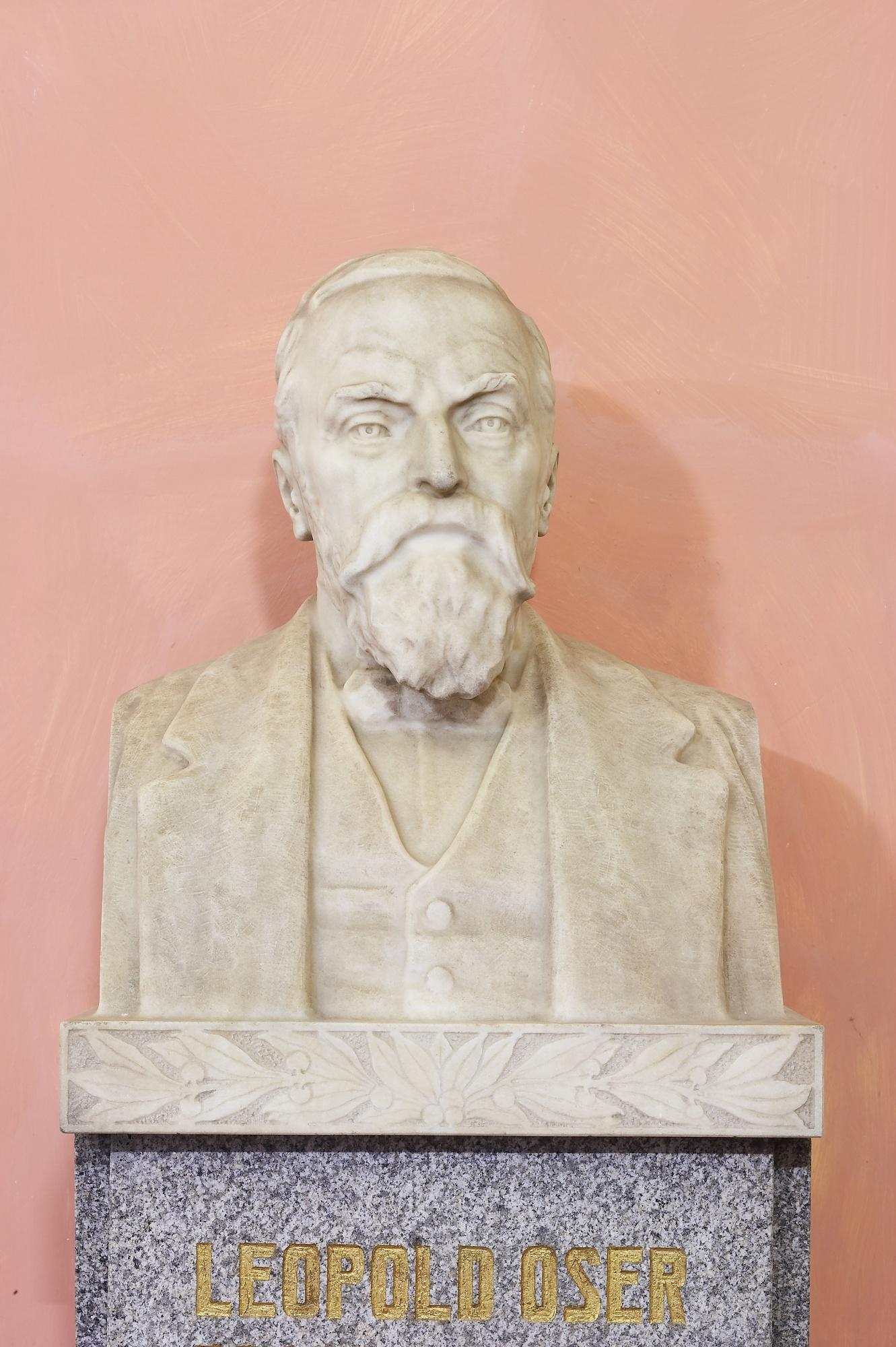
Bust of Leopold Oser in the arcade courtyard of the University of Vienna

After receiving his doctorate, Oser worked for five years as a secondary doctor at the Vienna General Hospital. From 1866, he headed the cholera department there. He was a department head at the General Polyclinic Vienna, which he co-founded in 1872 alongside eleven other doctors, including Heinrich Auspitz, Carl von Rokitansky, Johann Schnitzler, Robert Ultzmann and Wilhelm Winternitz. It was primarily intended for the training of doctors and the care of poorer patients and was financed by its founders and later also from donations. The novelty of the Vienna Polyclinic was that it attempted to cover the entire range of medical disciplines, while foreign polyclinics always focused on individual medical fields. It was thus the first of its kind in Europe.

In 1872 Oser was appointed primary physician of the newly opened Rothschild Hospital for the Jewish Community of Vienna, which he ran until his death. The same year he completed his Habilitation. In Vienna, cholera broke out due to the large number of visitors to the 1873 World's Fair and the inadequate sewage system. It was therefore no coincidence that Oser did pioneering work in the field of cholera treatment. In 1872 he was appointed head of the department of the General Polyclinic, and from 1873 he was a full member of the Lower Austrian State Medical Council, of which he was chairman from 1905. On 15 October 1885 he became an associate professor of internal medicine at the Medical University of Vienna and in 1902 was appointed professor (o. Univ.-Prof.) with the title Ordinarius (full professor).

In 1896 he became co-editor of the journal Archiv für Verdauungskrankheiten mit Einschluß der Stoffwechselpathologie und Diätetik (Archive for Digestive Diseases including Metabolic Pathology and Dietetics), newly founded by Ismar Isidor Boas together with leading internists from international university hospitals who at that early stage had worked with digestive and metabolic diseases and had published monographs on the subject. It soon became one of the leading and internationally recognized publications in gastroenterology and still exists today under the name Digestion, International Journal of Gastroenterology.

In 1907 Oser became a member of the board of trustees of Nathaniel Meyer von Rothschild's Foundation for Nervous Illnesses. Oser was a member of the Vienna School of Medicine and was awarded the honorary title of Hofrat.

=== Oser's stomach tube ===
Oser specialized in the treatment of diseases of the gastrointestinal tract. His major contribution in this area was in 1875 the introduction of a flexible gastric tube instead of a rigid tube, which the gastroenterologist Adolf Kussmaul had developed in 1867, during gastroscopy. (Kussmaul had the idea when observing a sword swallower.) This was preceded by the development of Charles Goodyear, who invented the vulcanization process in 1839 and was therefore able to produce elastic rubber. This flexible stomach tube conformed better to the human anatomy and was able to both alleviate the inconvenience of the examination and enable the doctor to analyze stomach function. It also prevented dangerous perforation of the esophagus or the stomach, which was not uncommon with rigid gastroscopy and was often fatal. According to an obituary, this achievement was not recognized accordingly and the innovation was later attributed to other doctors or Oser was not even mentioned. About the same time, Berlin physician Carl Anton Ewald also introduced this new method for probing the stomach, a method for the systematic examination of gastric secretions and stomach contents. It was not until 90 years later, in 1957, that the first fully flexible gastroscope found its way into gastroscopy, an invention of gastrologist Basil Isaac Hirschowitz and his technical director L. Curtiss, using fiberoptics.

Oser and Wilhelm Schlesinger (1839–1896), a Hungarian-Austrian gynecologist working as a private lecturer in Vienna, made the innervation of the uterus the subject of their investigations and in 1872 demonstrated an excitation center in the medulla oblongata, which is located at the transition of the central nervous system to the spinal cord. They also tried to experimentally determine the triggering of uterine movements when the blood is overloaded with carbon dioxide.

== Awards and honors ==
- Order of the Crown (Württemberg), Grand Cross with the Crown
- Austrian Golden Cross of Merit with the Crown from Emperor Franz Joseph I of Austria
- Honorary member of numerous medical and humanistic associations
- Oser's Grave of Honor is located in the Jewish section of the Vienna Central Cemetery.
- In the arcade courtyard of the University of Vienna, the university's Hall of Fame, a bust of Oser created by Carl Wollek has been in place since 1917.^{a}
- In 1932, a street in Vienna's 21st district was named after him (Osergasse). In 1938, the street was renamed Stammelgasse; on 15 April 1947 it was renamed back to Osergasse.

== Selected bibliography ==
Oser made a major contribution to the following publications along with the main authors:

- Eulenburg, Albert (2019). Real-Encyclopädie der gesamten Heilkunde (in German). Bod Third Party Titles. ISBN 978-3-7477-7783-1.
- Nothnagel, Carl Wilhelm Hermann; Stengel, Alfred (1905). Nothnagel's Encyclopedia of Practical Medicine. Saunders.
- Schlesinger, Wilhelm; Oser, Leopold (1873). Experimentelle Studien über Uterus Bewegungen.
- Über die mechanische Behandlung der Magenkrankheiten (in German). 1875.
- Reports on the Philadelphia International Exhibition of 1876. G.E. Eyre and W. Spottiswoode. 1877. p. 187.
- Vierteljahresschrift für Dermatologie und Syphilis (in German). W. Braumüller. 1883.
- Real-Encyclopädie der gesammten Heilkunde v. 8, 1881 (in German). Urban & Schwarzenberg. 1881. pp. 466–486.
- Mikulicz, Johann (1881). Über Gastroskopie und Oesophagoskopie (in German). Urban und Schwarzenberg.
- Wiener medizinische Blätter (in German). 1884. p. 1281.
- Die Neurosen des Magens und ihre Behandlung (in German). Vienna/Leipzig: Vienna Clinic. 1885. pp. 4, 333.
- Groß, O.; Guleke, N. (2013). Die Erkrankungen des Pankreas (in German). Springer-Verlag. ISBN 978-3-642-90693-0.

== Notes ==
^aAs part of the "cleansing" by the National Socialists at the beginning of November 1938, ten sculptures by Jewish or supposedly Jewish professors in the arcade courtyard were overturned or smeared with paint in connection with the "Langemarck celebration". At this point in time, the acting rector Fritz Knoll had inspected the arcade courtyard sculptures; on his instructions, fifteen monuments were removed and placed in a depot, including that of Leopold Oser. After the end of the war, all damaged and removed monuments were put back in the arcade courtyard in 1947.
