= General Polyclinic Vienna =

Hospital in Vienna, Austria

Coordinates: 44.2161°N 16.3491°E

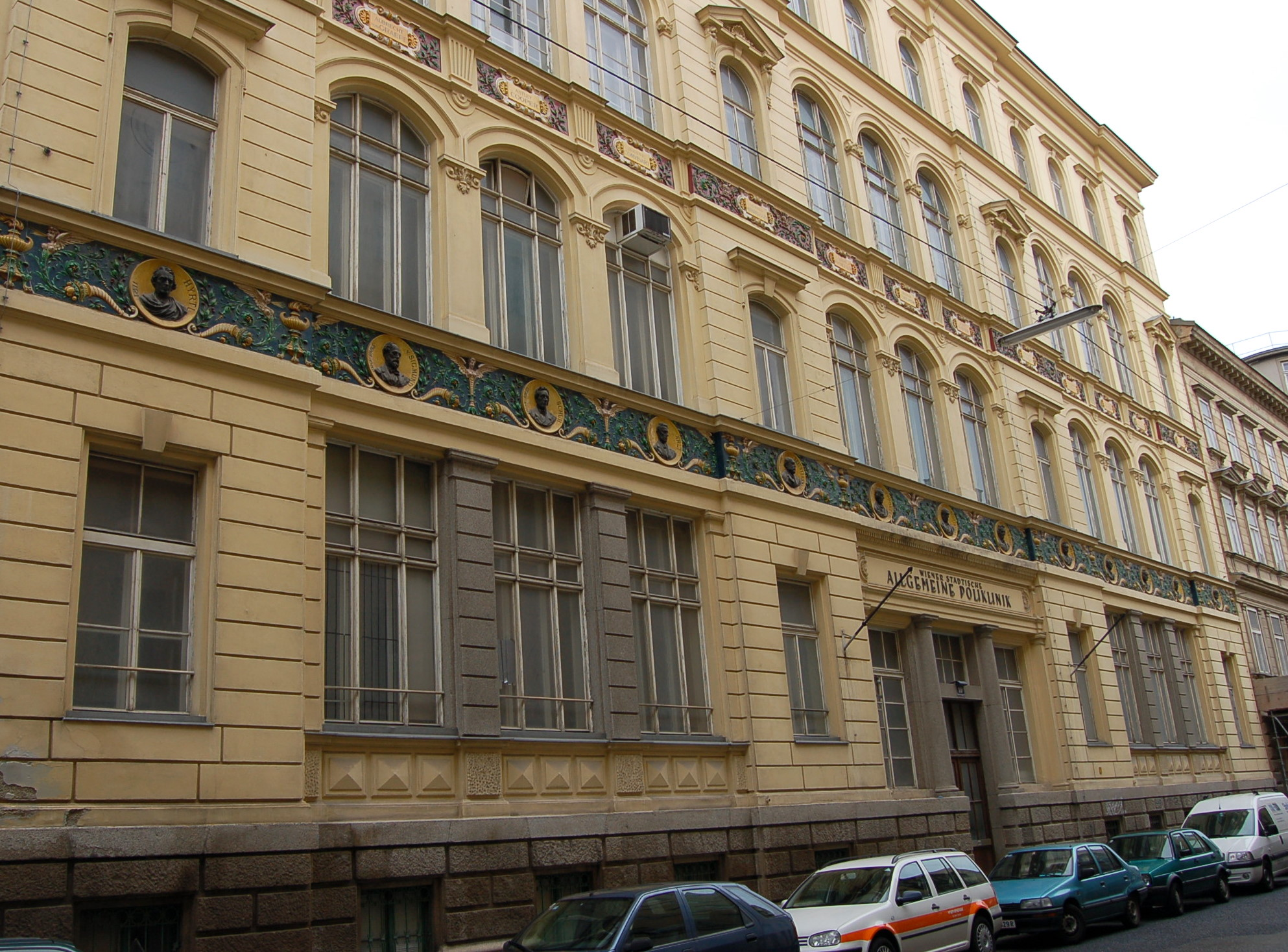
The building of the former polyclinic in Vienna-Alsergrund, Mariannengasse 10

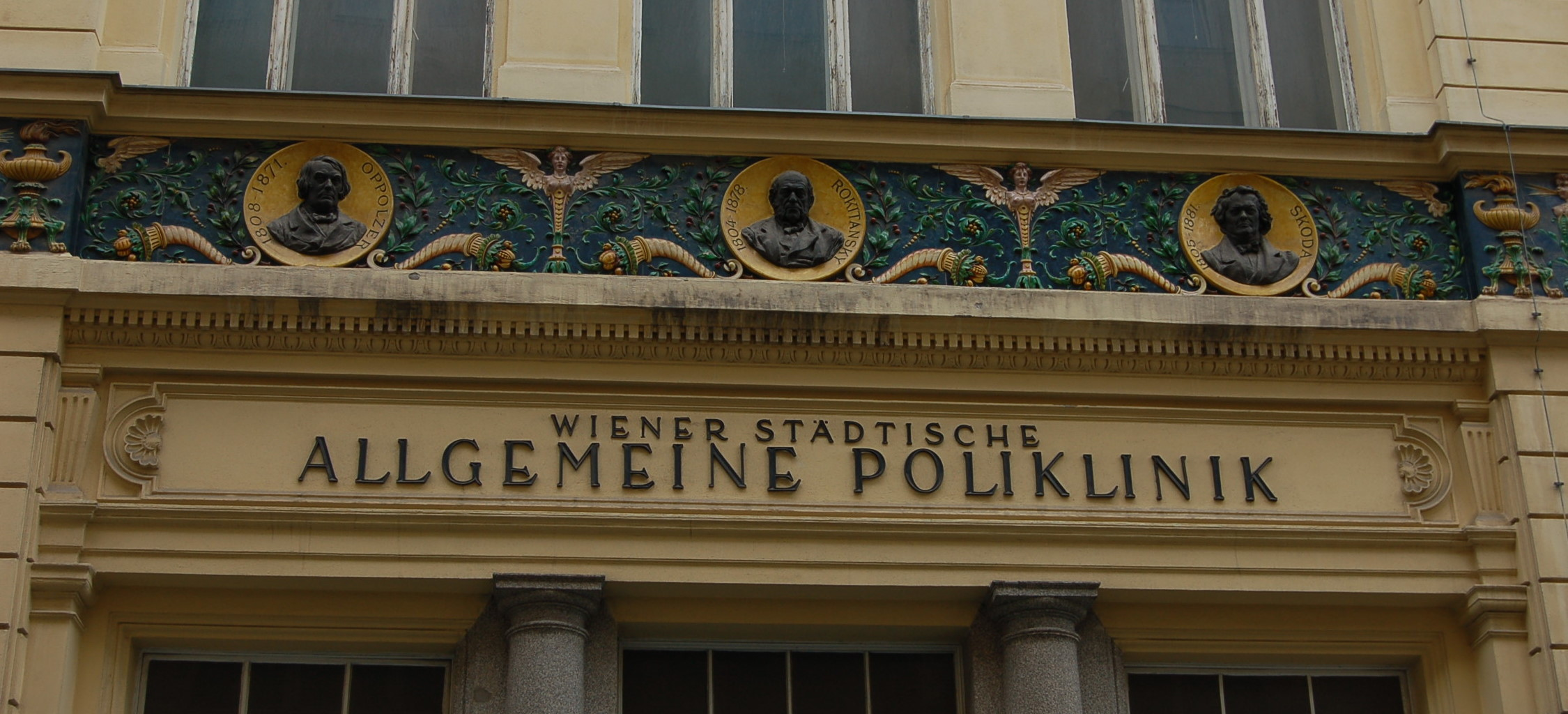
Inscription above the entrance

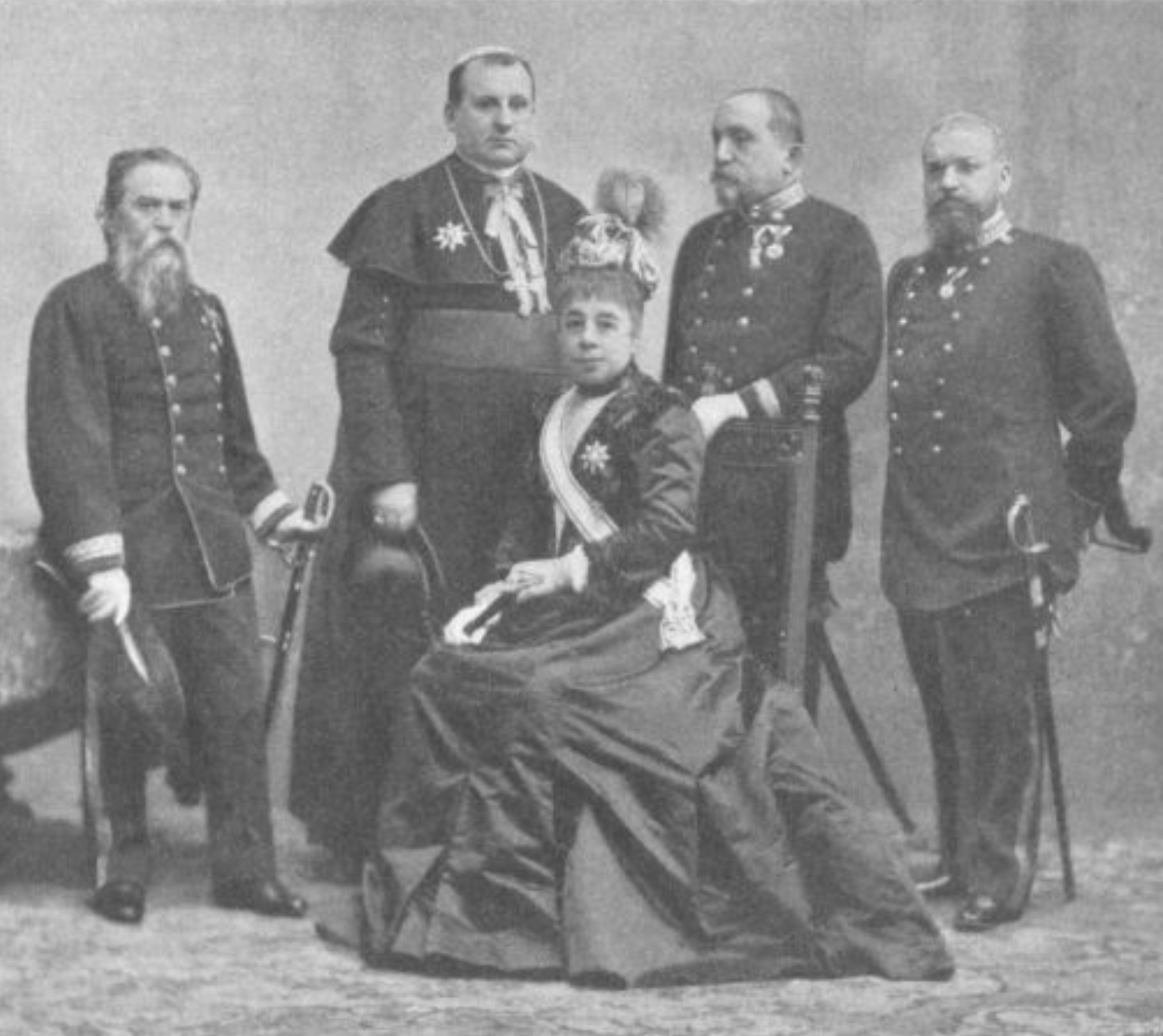
The leading figures of the Vienna Polyclinic, 1902, from left, August Leopold von Reuss, Auxiliary Bishop Godfried Marschall, Princess Pauline von Metternich, Alois Monti and Julius Mauthner

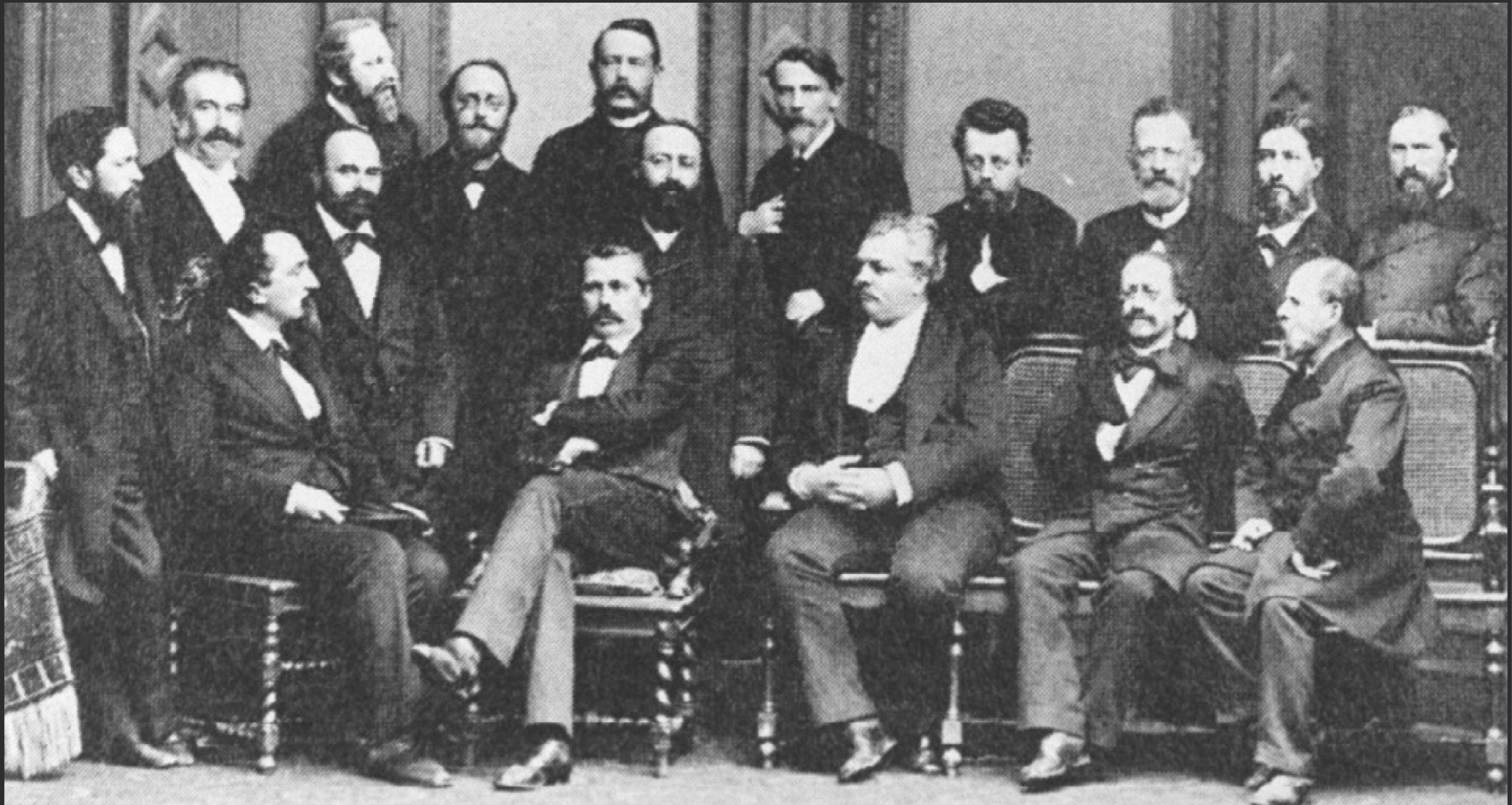
The department heads of the General Polyclinic in Vienna around 1885, from left, seated: Alois Monti, Johann Schnitzler, Robert Ultzmann, Jakob Hock and Samuel Siegfried Karl von Basch; From left, standing: August Leopold von Reuss, Emil Stoffella, Wilhelm Winternitz, Leopold Oser, Anton von Frisch, Hans von Hebra, Ludwig Fürth, Moriz Benedikt, Viktor Urbantschitsch, Max Herz, Anton Wölfler and Ludwig Bandl.

The General Polyclinic (Allgemeine Poliklinik) was a hospital in Vienna where many well-known Austrian physicians worked.

== Founding ==
The polyclinic was founded in 1872 by twelve young university assistants, making it the first of its kind in Europe. The novelty of the Vienna Polyclinic was that it sought to cover the entire range of medical subjects, whereas foreign polyclinics always focused on individual medical specialties. That is why this Viennese institution bore the name General Polyclinic. The founders were

- Heinrich Auspitz (1835–1886), dermatologist
- Friedrich Ludwig Fleischmann (1841–1878), pediatrician
- Jakob Hock (1831–1890), ophthalmologist
- Ignaz Neudörfer (1825–1898), surgeon
- Leopold Oser (1839–1910), internist
- August Leopold von Reuss (1841–1924), ophthalmologist
- Carl von Rokitansky (1839–1924), gynecologist
- Emil Rollet (1835–1923), internist
- Johann Schnitzler (1835–1893), internist and laryngologist
- Mathias Schwanda (1821–1885), neurologist
- Robert Ultzmann (1842–1889), surgeon and urologist
- Wilhelm Winternitz (1834–1917), internist and hydrotherapist

A few months later the following people joined:

- Alois Monti (1838–1909), pediatric diseases
- Viktor Urbantschitsch (1847–1921), diseases of the ear
- Maximilian Leidesdorf (1816–1889), mood and nervous disorders

Other physicians:

- Josef von Metnitz (1861–1905), dentist

== Significance ==
Already in its first year of operation, 12,000 patients were treated free of charge in 56,456 consultations, and lectures were given by 14 lecturers to 217 attendees.

Originally located on Wipplingerstrasse in the First District, these were outpatient clinics designed primarily to improve care for poor patients and to facilitate teaching and research work. The costs of the operation were initially borne by the founders themselves, but four years later an association was established to raise funds. Princess Pauline von Metternich in particular supported the association.

In 1875, Leopold Oser, who was considered "Austria's only and best stomach specialist", introduced a flexible stomach tube instead of a rigid tube for gastroscopy, which the gastroenterologist Adolf Kußmaul had developed in 1867. This flexible gastric tube better adapted to the human anatomy and was able to both alleviate the discomfort of the examination and allow the physician to perform analyses of gastric function. It also prevented dangerous perforation of the esophagus or stomach, which was not uncommon with rigid gastroscopy and often fatal.

In 1875, the polyclinic moved to Oppolzergasse in the same district and in 1880 to Schwarzspanierstraße in the ninth district, where the first inpatient hospital operation with five beds was also started. In 1892, the polyclinic moved to the building in Mariannengasse, where it remained until the end.

The individual hospital departments, outpatient clinics and a lecture hall were gradually built here. From 1896 there was an X-ray cabinet, which in 1904 developed into the first X-ray institute in Austria. From 1898 to 1930, Julius Mannaberg served as head of the Internal Department of the Vienna General Polyclinic.

But other specialist departments were also established. Anton von Frisch (1849-1917), for example, founded the first urological outpatient clinic in Europe and succeeded in having urology installed as a separate subject at the University of Vienna. Hans Rubritius was head of urology from 1919 to 1943. Johann Schnitzler (1835-1893), Arthur Schnitzler's father, opened a laryngology department. Arthur Schnitzler himself also worked for him as an assistant until 1893. His work Professor Bernhardi, written in 1912, had the polyclinic as a model.

The polyclinic inspired the creation of numerous clinics throughout Europe around the turn of the century. It pioneered new therapies, such as the first hydrotherapeutic ward, established under Wilhelm Winternitz. Viktor Frankl headed the neurological department from 1946 to 1970. Johannes Bischko established an acupuncture outpatient clinic, which became famous in 1972 with the first tonsil operation with acupuncture instead of anesthesia. In 1975, the Ludwig Boltzmann Institute for Homeopathy was opened by Mathias Dorcsi (1923-2001).

== Nazi era ==
From 1938 the polyclinic was owned by the Municipality of Vienna. Reporting on 28 March 1938, shortly after Austria's Anschluss with Nazi Germany, Time magazine wrote of the devastating impact of the anti-semitic persecution of the many Jewish doctors on the polyclinic and other medical establishments in Vienna, listing the suicides.

== Postwar ==
It was briefly used as a geriatric rehabilitation center, but then finally closed on 15 December 1998. On the site, which apart from the building in Mariannengasse included other adjacent areas as far as Lazarettgasse, the Vienna Competence Center was built as a location for research institutions and companies from the fields of medicine, biomedicine, medical technology and complementary service areas.

Between 2008 and 2012, the landmark main building of the former Vienna Polyclinic as well as the adjacent buildings were completely renovated and transformed into a contemporary office and residence.

== Literature ==
- Horst Haschek, Peter Porpaczy: "A different kind of Secession. The Vienna Polyclinic". In: Austria Today 1986, 3, ISSN 0304-8713, pp. 25–27
- Erich E. Deimer (ed.): Chronik der Allgemeinen Poliklinik in Wien im Spiegel der Medizin- und Sozialgeschichte. Göschl, Wien 1989, ISBN 3850970566
