= Vienna Central Cemetery =

Cemetery in Vienna, Austria

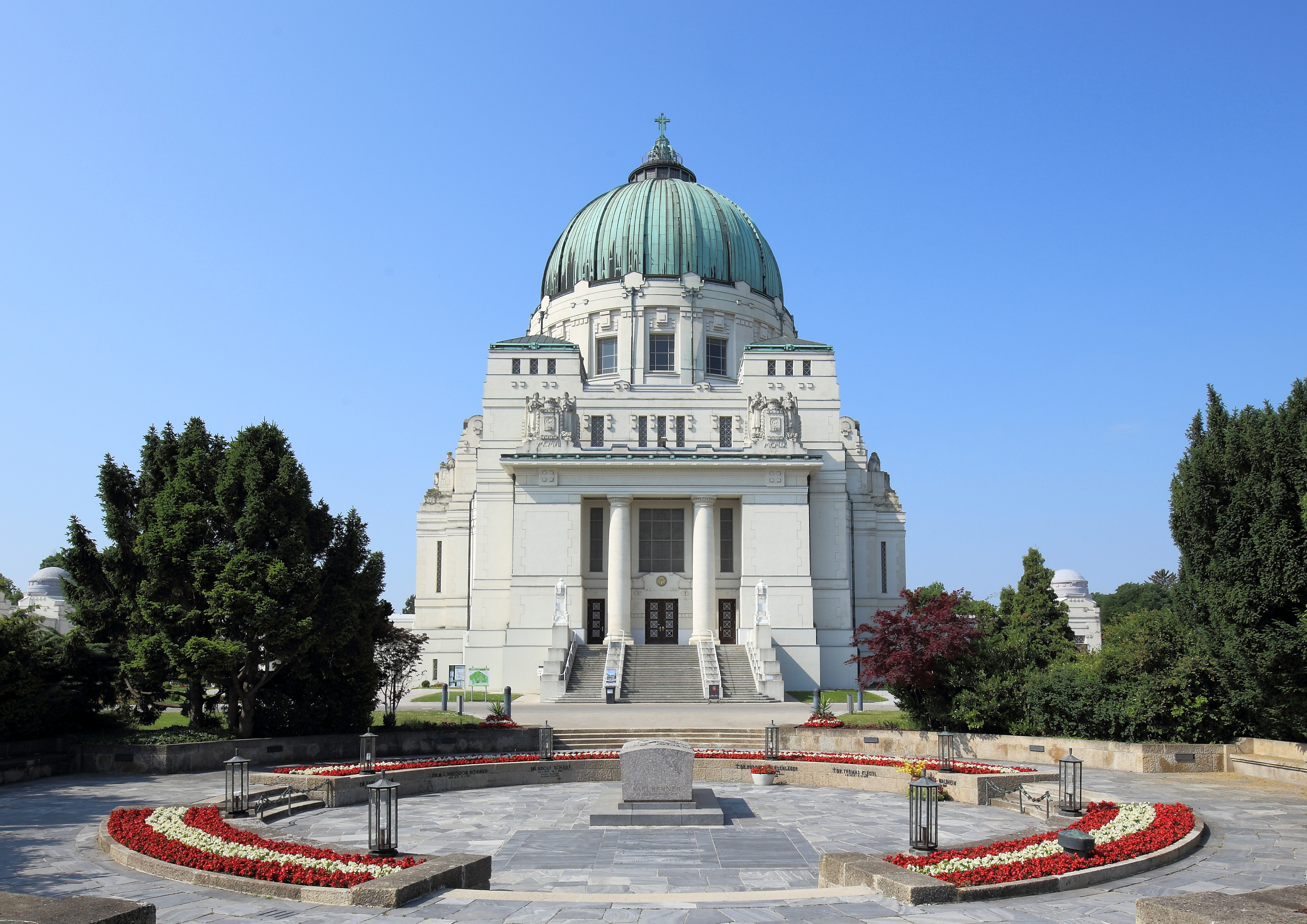
- The St. Charles Borromeo Cemetery Church in the middle of the Vienna Central Cemetery
- Interactive map of Vienna Central Cemetery

Details
- Established: 1863
- Location: Simmering, Vienna, Austria
- Country: Austria
- Coordinates: 48°09′09″N 16°26′24″E
- Type: Public
- Size: 2.4 square kilometres (590 acres)
- No. of graves: Over 330,000 graves
- No. of interments: 3 million

The Vienna Central Cemetery (German: Wiener Zentralfriedhof) is one of the largest cemeteries in the world by number of interred, and is the best known among Vienna's nearly 50 cemeteries. The cemetery's name is descriptive of its significance as Vienna's biggest cemetery, not of its geographic location, as it is not in the city center of the Austrian capital, but on the southern outskirts, in the outer city district of Simmering.

== History and description ==
Unlike many others, the Vienna Central Cemetery is not one that has evolved slowly. The decision to establish a new, big cemetery for Vienna came in 1863 when it became clear that – due to industrialization – the city's population would eventually increase to such an extent that the existing communal cemeteries would prove to be insufficient. City leaders expected that Vienna, then capital of the large Austro-Hungarian Empire, would grow to four million inhabitants by the end of the 20th century, as no one foresaw the Empire's collapse in 1918. The city council therefore assigned an area significantly outside of the city's borders and of such large dimension, that it would suffice for a long time to come. They decided in 1869 that a flat area in Simmering should be the site of the future Central Cemetery. The cemetery was designed in 1870; according to the plans of the Frankfurt landscape architects Karl Jonas Mylius and Alfred Friedrich Bluntschli who were awarded for their project per angusta ad augusta (from dire to sublime).

The cemetery was opened on All Saints' Day in 1874. However the consecration of the cemetery was not without controversy: the interdenominational character of the new cemetery – the different faith groups being interred on the same ground – met with fierce resistance, especially in conservative circles of the Roman Catholic Church.

This argument became even more aggressive when the city announced that it did not want an official Catholic opening of the new cemetery – but gave a substantial amount of money toward the construction of a segregated Jewish section. In the end, the groups reached an agreement resulting in the Catholic representatives opening the Central Cemetery with a small ceremony. Due to refraining from having a large public showing, the new cemetery was inaugurated almost unnoticed in the early morning of 31 October 1874 by Vienna Mayor Baron Cajetan von Felder and Cardinal Joseph Othmar Rauscher to avoid an escalation of the public controversy. The official opening of the Central Cemetery occurred the following day. The first burial was that of Jacob Zelzer, followed by 15 others that day. The grave of Jacob Zelzer still exists near the administration building at the cemetery wall.

The cemetery spans 2.5 km^{2} (620 acres) with 330,000 gravesites containing around 3 million deceased, and up to 25 burials daily. It is also the second largest cemetery, after the 4 km^{2} (990 acres) of Hamburg's Ohlsdorf Cemetery, which is the largest in Europe by land area.

A Viennese joke has it that the Central Cemetery is "half the size of Zürich, but twice as much fun", (German: Halb so groß wie Zürich – aber doppelt so lustig ist der Wiener Zentralfriedhof!).

Opposite the cemetery's main gate, across Simmeringer Hauptstrasse, is the Feuerhalle Simmering, Vienna's first crematorium, which was built by Clemens Holzmeister in 1922 in the style of an oriental fortress.

St. Charles Borromeo Cemetery Church is the central church of the cemetery. It used to be called Dr. Karl-Lueger-Gedächtniskirche (Karl Lueger Memorial Church) because of the crypt of the former mayor of Vienna below the high altar. This church in Art Nouveau style was built in 1908–1910 by Max Hegele. The crypt of Austrian presidents is situated in front of the church. The burial vault is located beneath the sarcophagus, with stairs leading down to a circular room whose walls are lined with niches where urns or coffins can be interred.

On 1 November 2023, unidentified vandals set a fire and sprayed swastikas on external walls overnight in the cemetery's Jewish section. The entrance lobby to a ceremonial hall was burned for the first time since the 1938 Kristallnacht pogrom by the Nazis, but there were no injuries. The attack was condemned by Austrian Chancellor Karl Nehammer.

== Ehrengräber ==
In its early incarnations, the cemetery was unpopular because of its distance from the city centre. This forced authorities to think of ways to make it more attractive: Hence honorary graves (German: Ehrengrab) as a way of attracting tourists were established.

Interred in the Central Cemetery are notables such as Ludwig van Beethoven and Franz Schubert, who were moved to the Central Cemetery from "Währinger Ostfriedhof" in 1888; Johannes Brahms; Antonio Salieri; Johann Strauss II and Arnold Schoenberg. A cenotaph honours Wolfgang Amadeus Mozart, who is buried in nearby St. Marx Cemetery.

== Interdenominational character ==
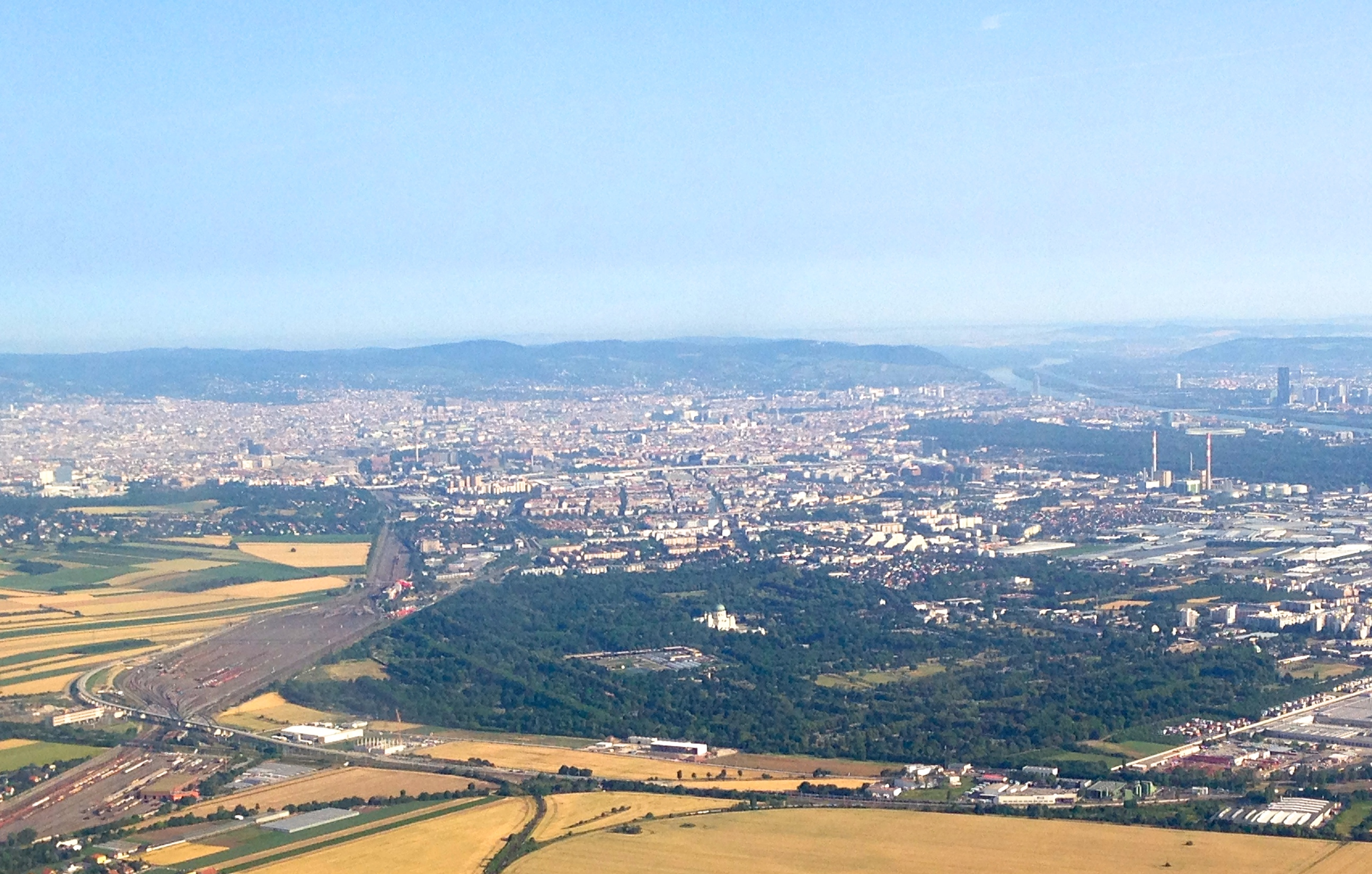
A bird's-eye view of Vienna Central Cemetery, with Vienna in the background

In addition to the Catholic section, the cemetery houses a Protestant cemetery (opened 1904) and two Jewish cemeteries.

Although the older of the two, established in 1863, was destroyed by the Nazis during the Kristallnacht, around 60,000 graves remain intact. Cemetery records indicate 79,833 Jewish burials as of 10 July 2011. Prominent burials here include those of the Rothschild family and that of the author Arthur Schnitzler. The second Jewish cemetery was built in 1917 and is still in use today. There were 58,804 Jewish burials in the new section as of 21 November 2007. Officials discovered the desecration of 43 Jewish graves in the two Jewish sections on 29 June 2012, an anti-Semitic act – the stones and slabs were toppled or damaged.

Since 1876, Muslims have been buried at Vienna's Zentralfriedhof. The dead are buried according to Austrian law, in a coffin, in contrast to the Islamic ritual practice: burial in a shroud. The opening of the new Islamic cemetery of the Islamic Faith Community took place on 3 October 2008 in Liesing.

The cemetery also contains Russian Orthodox burial grounds (Saint Lazarus chapel, 1894) and plots dedicated for the use of various Eastern Orthodox churches. Since 1869, members of the Greek Orthodox community have been buried in Section 30 A, just west of Gate 2, near the arcades. The Romanian Orthodox community is near Gate 3 in Section 38 as are members of the Bulgarian Orthodox churches. The Serbian Orthodox community received portions of Sections 68 B and 69 C, near Gate 3. Section 27 A contains the tombs of the Coptic Orthodox Church.

The Protestant section on the east side is dedicated for the use of both confessions-parts of the Evangelical Protestant church in Austria, the Lutheran A.B (Evangelische Kirche Augsburger Bekenntnis) and Calvinist H.B (Evangelische Kirche Helvetisches Bekenntnis). The cemetery was inaugurated in the presence of the President of the Evangelical Protestant Church, Dr. Rudolf Franz on 14 November 1904. The cemetery was expanded in 1926, 1972 and 1998. The Protestant section consists of 6,000 graves and 300 family vaults. There is a 300-seat church named Heilandskirche on the cemetery ground which serves the purpose of a cemetery chapel. The church was consecrated by Pastor Rudolf Morally. The reredos and the altar on the apse of the church is ornamented with a crucifix by sculptor Josef Grünhut.

In 2000, a Baby burial ground opened in Section 35 B near Gate 3 where stillborn infants, dead babies, and young children up to 110 centimetres (43 in) of height are interred.

Europe's first Buddhist cemetery was established in the Vienna Central Cemetery in May 2005. An area of the Central Cemetery has been set aside for this purpose centered around a stupa, and was consecrated by a Tibetan monk.

The new Anatomy Memorial opened in Section 26, on 5 March 2009, for interments of the Institute of Anatomy of the Medical University of Vienna and for the people who donated their bodies to science.

The Church of Jesus Christ of Latter-day Saints in Austria celebrated the dedication of a hectare-sized plot set apart for the Mormon deceased in the Vienna Central Cemetery, on 19 September 2009.

== Access ==
Private car traffic is allowed on the cemetery grounds every day of the year except 1 November (All Saints' Day), although vehicles must pay a toll. Because of the large number of visitors on 1 November, private vehicles are not permitted. A public "cemetery bus" line (Route 106) operates on the grounds with several stops. The old Simmering horse tram was replaced by an electric tram, running from Schwarzenbergplatz to the Central Cemetery, in 1901 and it was renumbered as "71" (der 71er) in 1907; it remains the most popular route to the cemetery by public transport. The "Zentralfriedhof" stop on the Vienna S-Bahn (metro suburban railway) is close to the old Jewish part of the cemetery. The closest underground stop is "Simmering" (Vienna U-Bahn, line U3), about 2 kilometres (1.2 mi) from the cemetery.

== Gallery ==
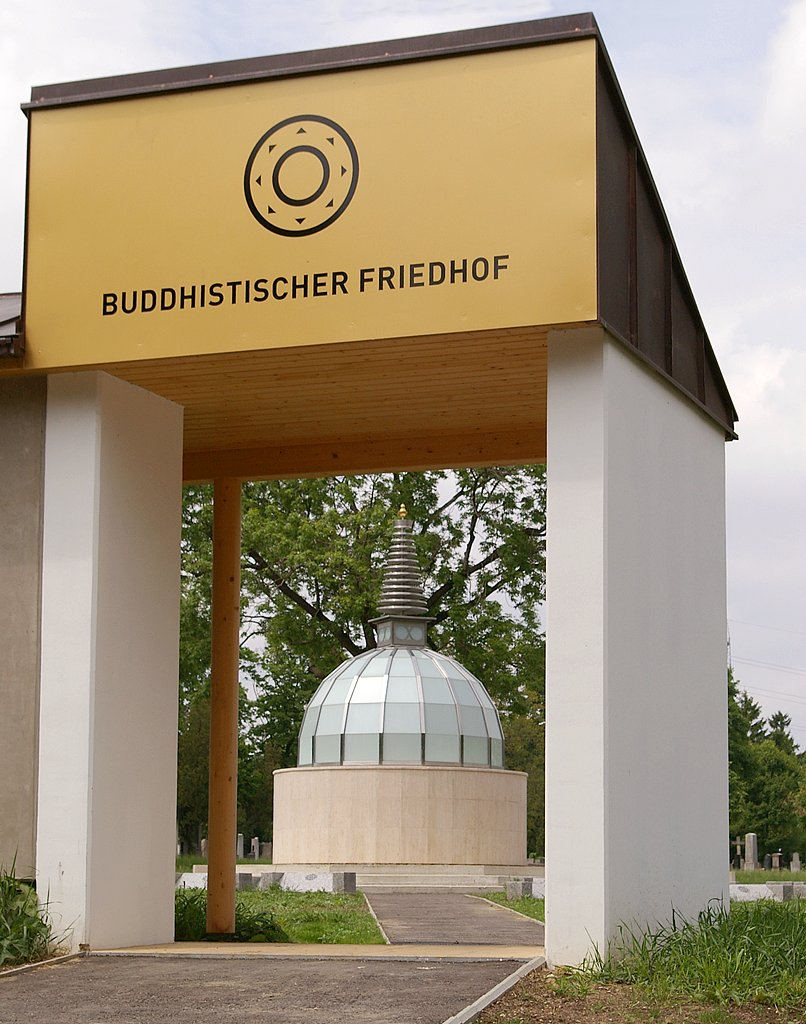
Buddhist burial ground

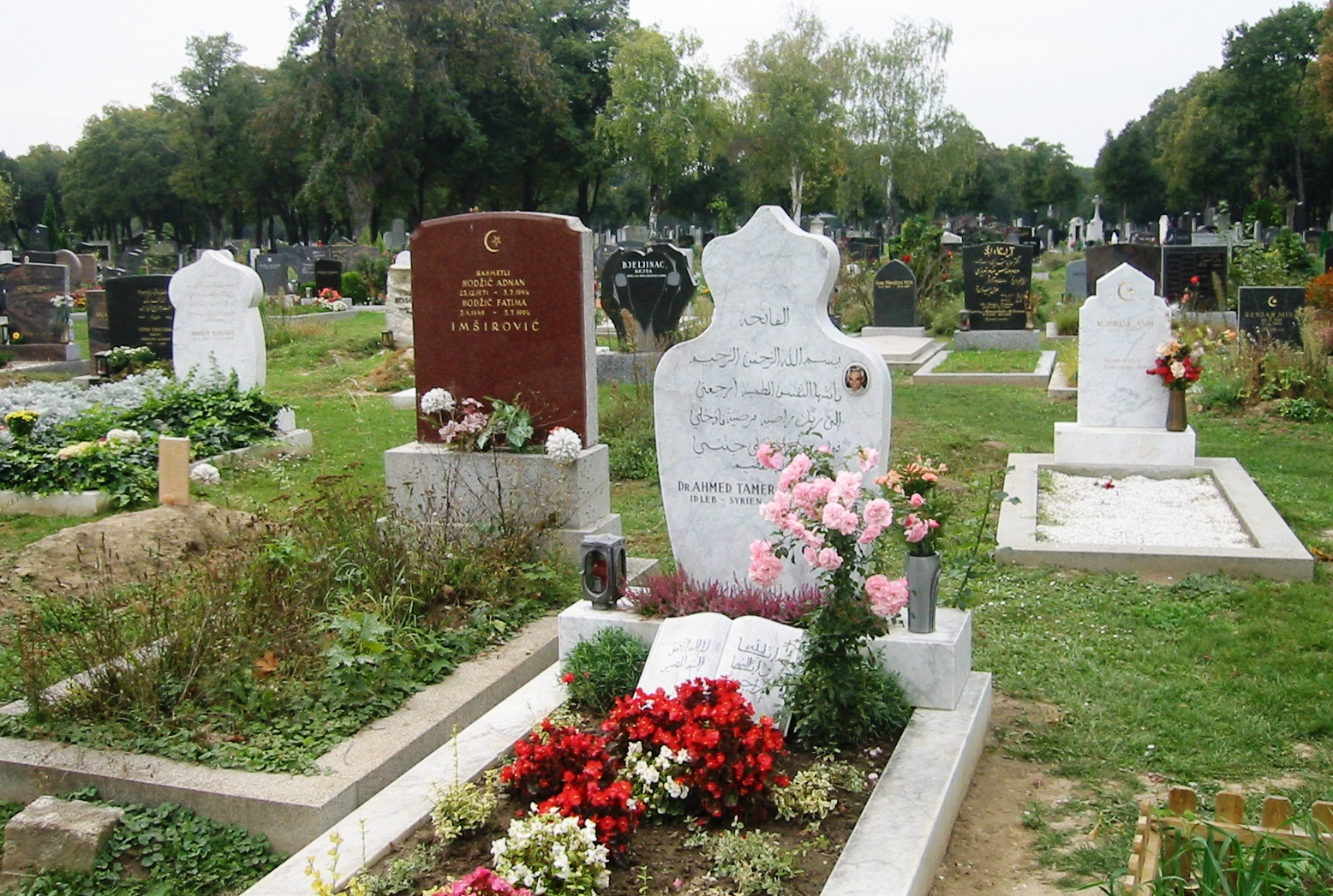
Muslim section

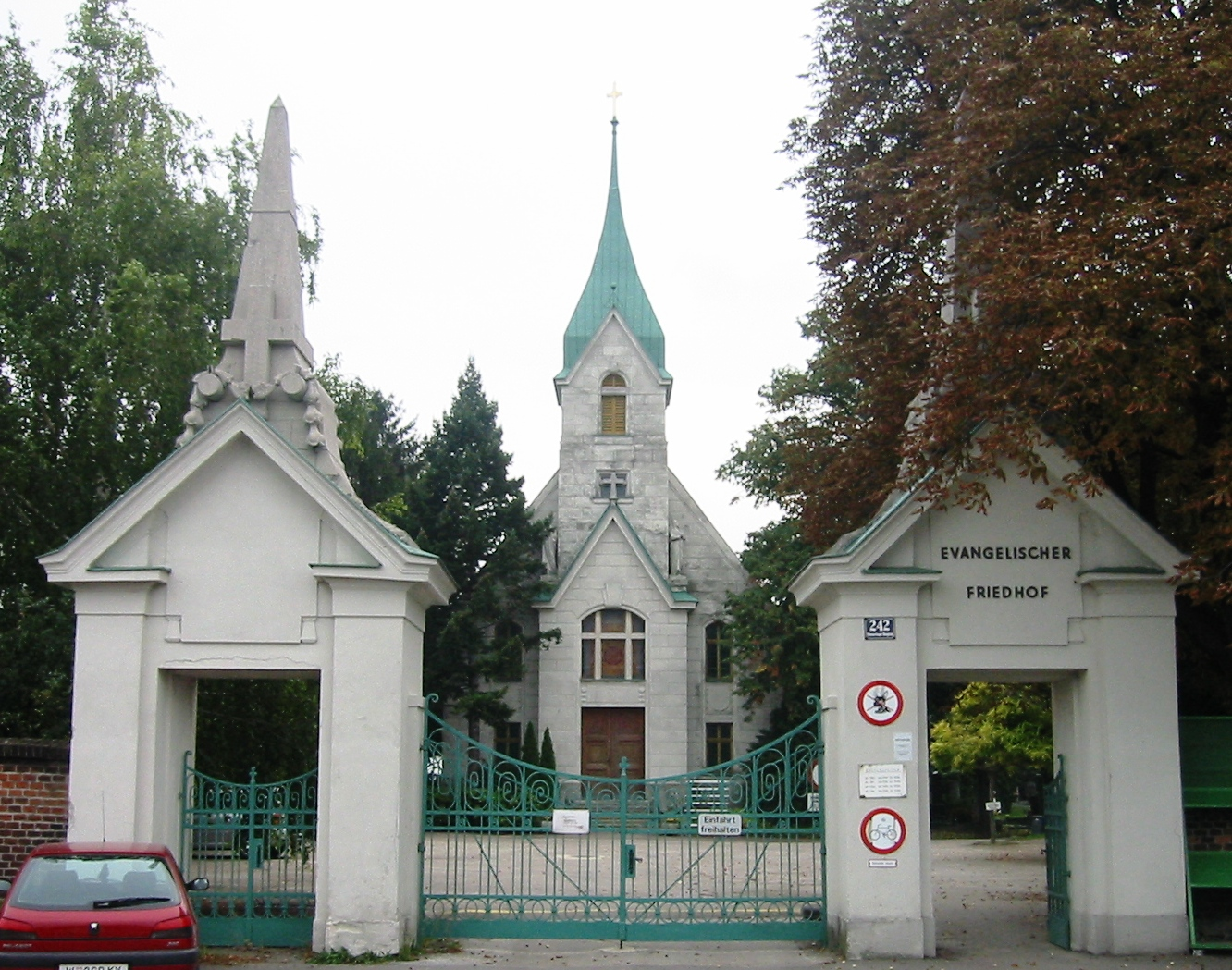
Protestant section with the cemetery church 'Heilandskirche'

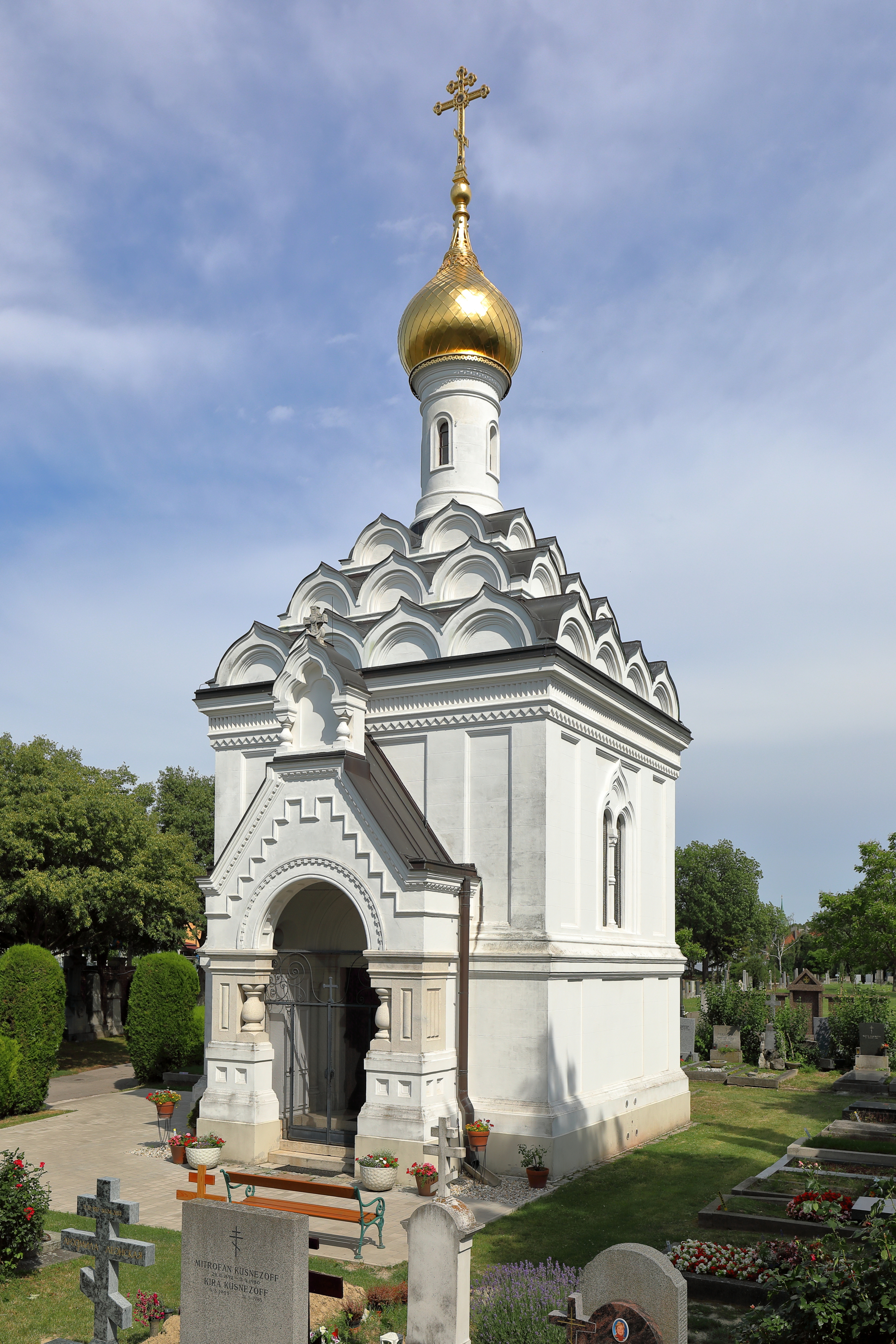
Russian Orthodox chapel

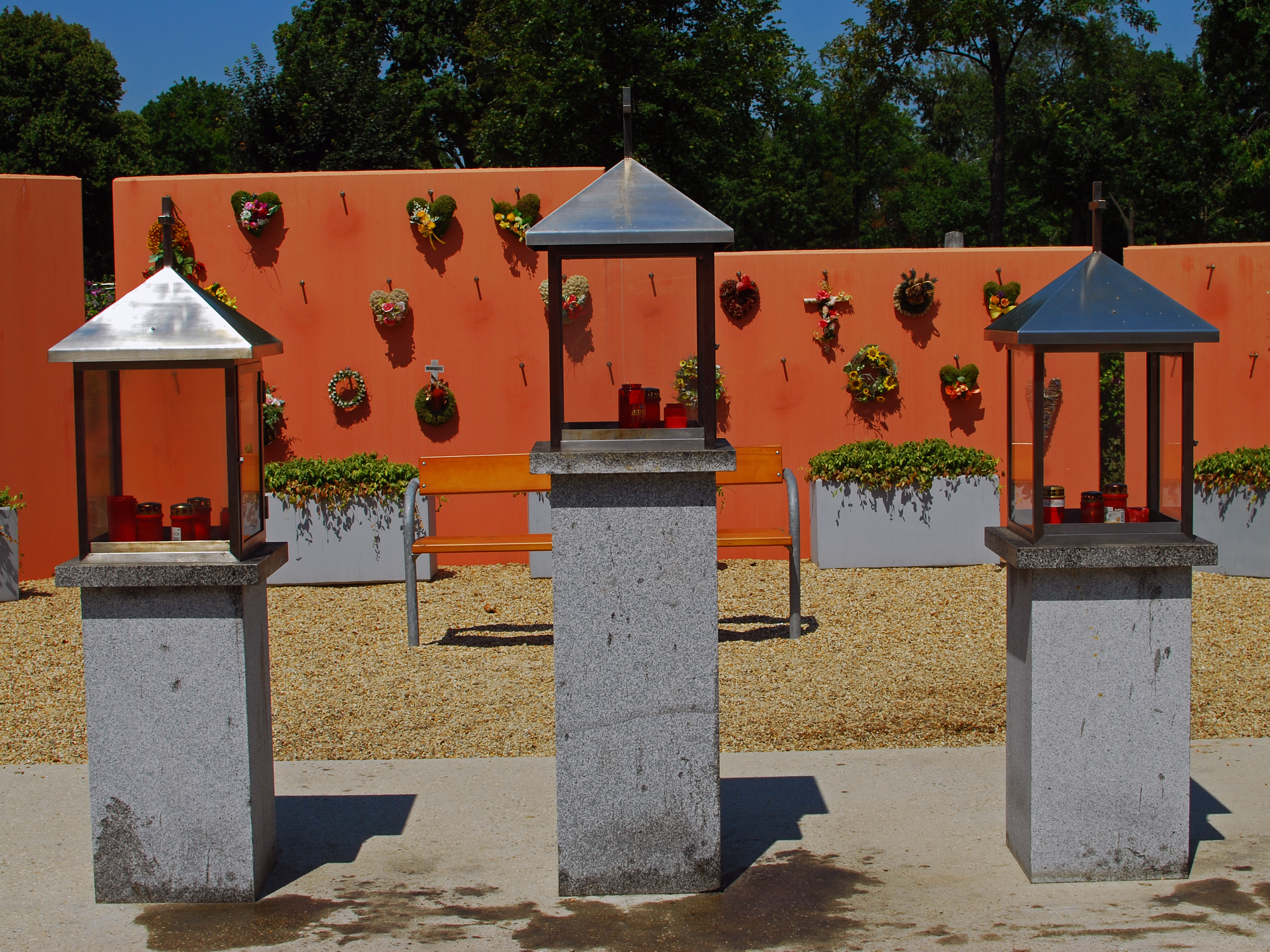
Anatomy Memorial

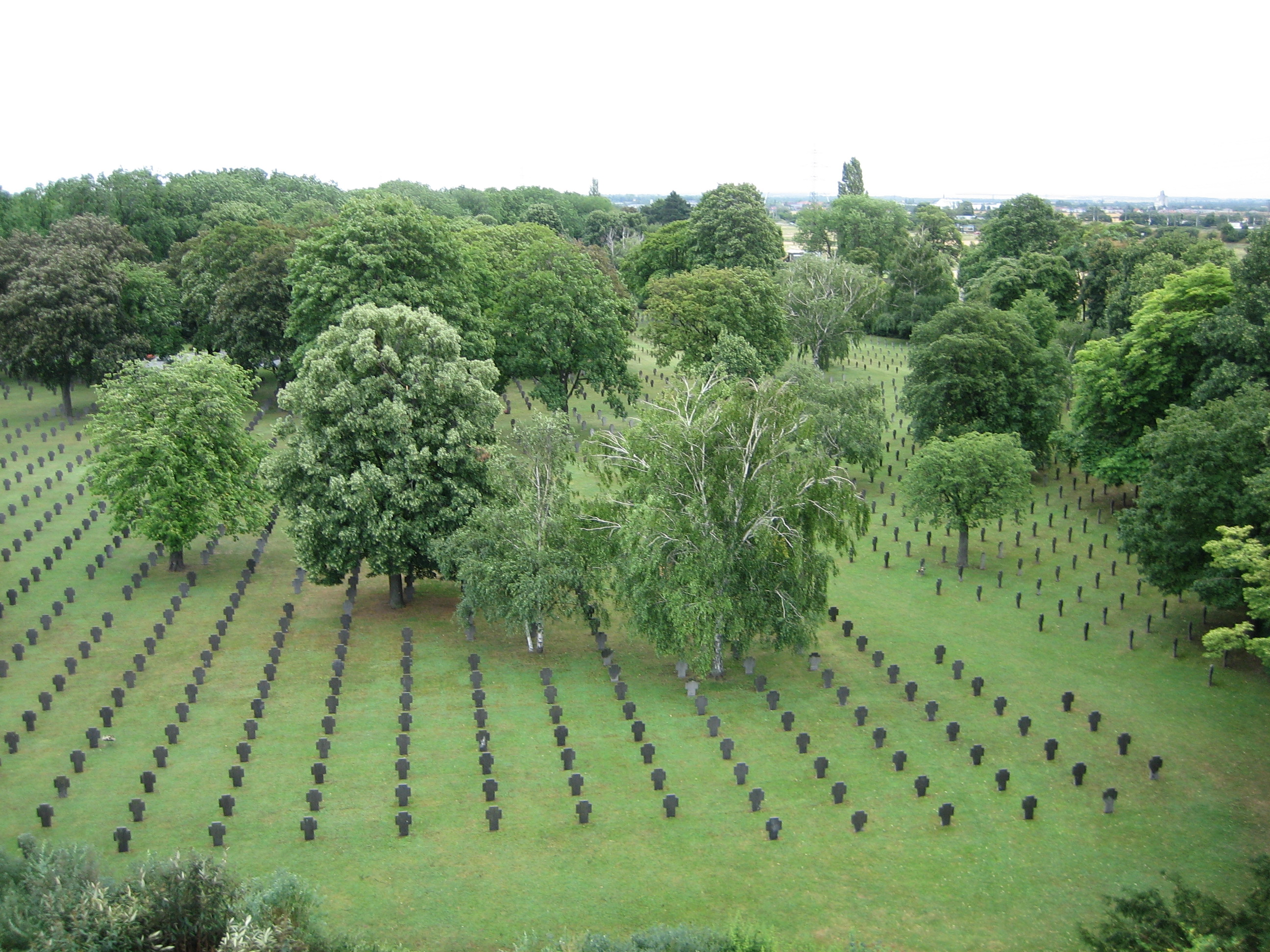
Military section

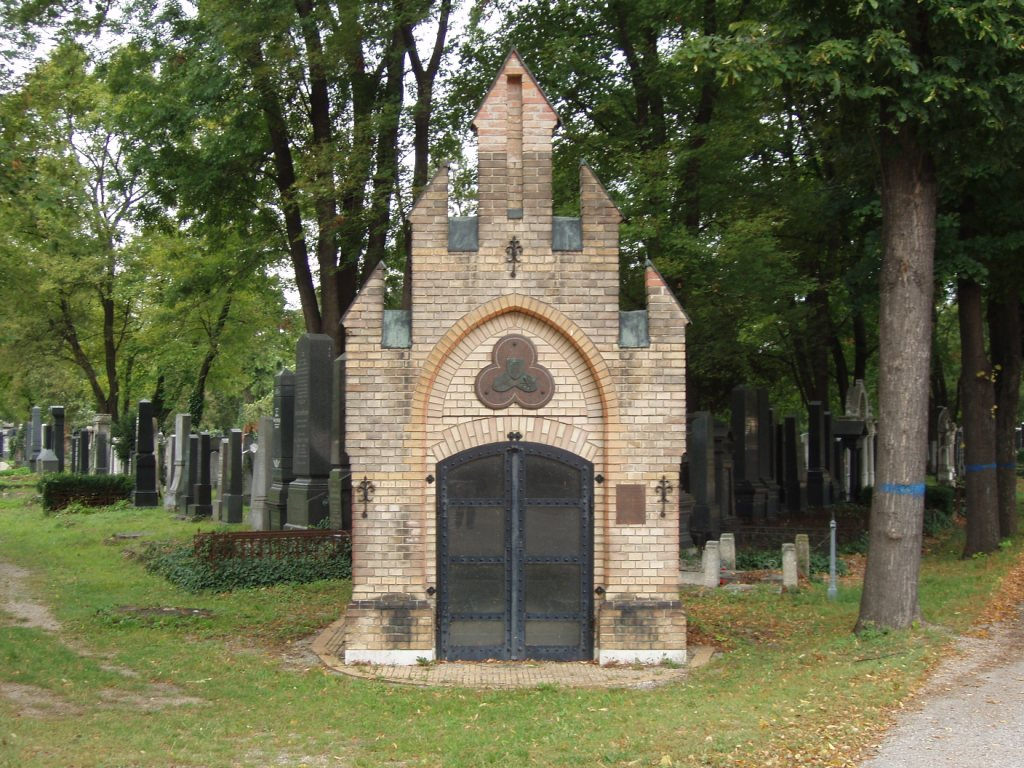
Mausoleum of the architect Max Fleischer (1841–1905) in the old Jewish section

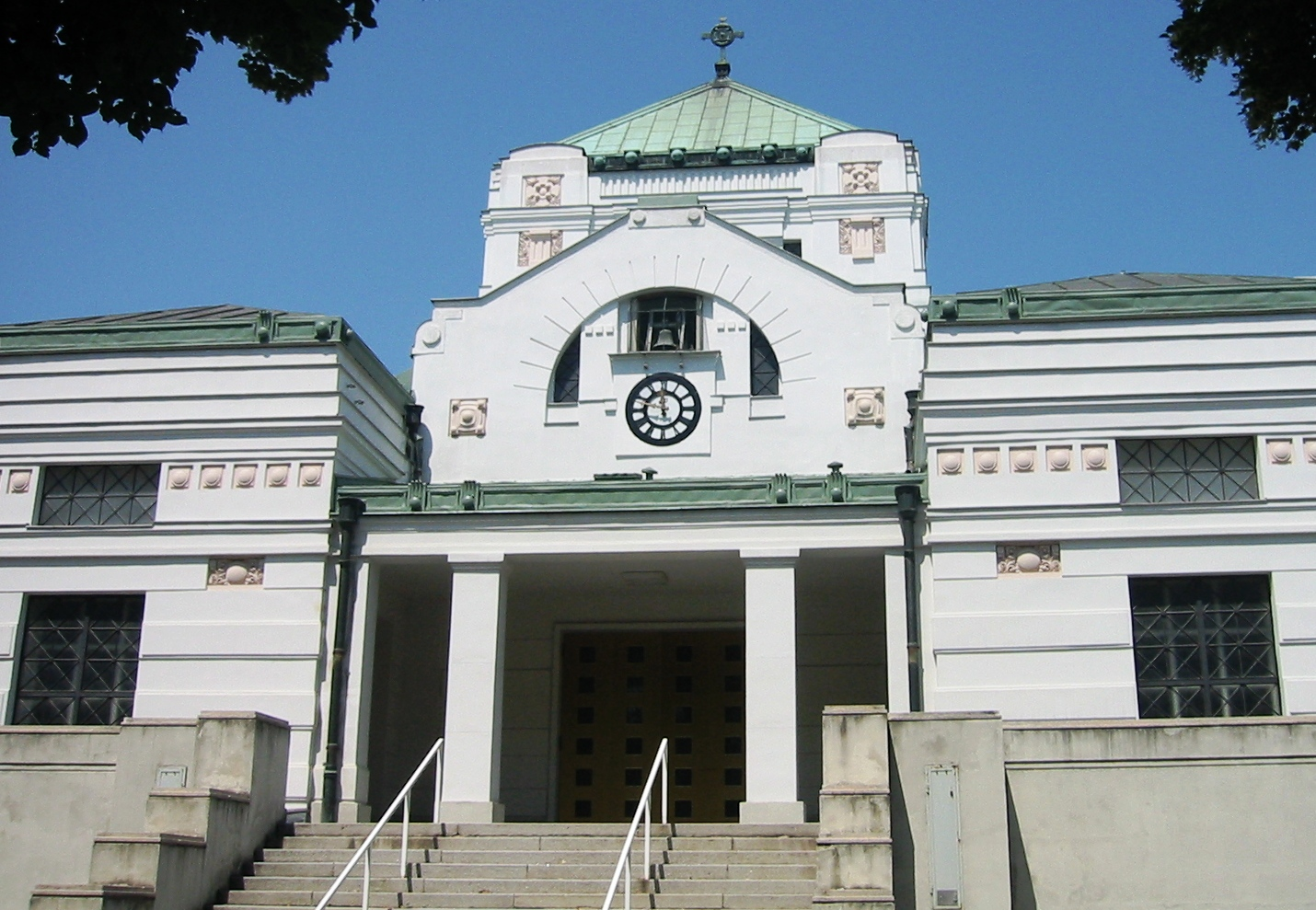
Mortuary building

== Cultural references ==
The cemetery is the scene of Harry Lime's fake and real funeral at the beginning and end of The Third Man. The musician Wolfgang Ambros credited the cemetery in his 1975 song "Es lebe der Zentralfriedhof" ("Long live the Central Cemetery"), marking with it the 100th anniversary of its opening.

== Notable interments ==
- Alfred Adler (1870–1937), psychiatrist and psychologist, founder of individual psychology
- Wolf Albach-Retty (1906–1967), Austrian actor
- Rudolf von Alt (1812–1905), painter
- Alois Ander (1821–1864), Bohemian-born operatic tenor
- Franz Antel (1913–2007), film director, writer and producer
- Leon Askin (1907–2005), actor
- Heinrich Auspitz (1835–1886), dermatologist
- Franz von Bayros (1866–1924), artist
- Ludwig van Beethoven (1770–1827), composer
- Erna Berger (1900–1990), opera singer
- Ulrich Bettac (1897–1959), actor
- Hedy Bienenfeld (1907–1976), Austrian-American Olympic swimmer
- Theodor Billroth (1829–1894), surgeon
- Ludwig Boltzmann (1844–1906), physicist/mathematician
- Eugen von Böhm-Bawerk (1851–1914), Austrian economist
- Sergei Bortkiewicz (1877–1952), composer, with his wife Elisabeth
- Johannes Brahms (1833–1897), composer
- Adolf von Brudermann (1854–1945), Austro-Hungarian general
- Rudolf von Brudermann (1851–1941), Austro-Hungarian general
- Ignaz Brüll (1846–1907), composer
- Carl Czerny (1791–1857), piano teacher and composer
- Elfi von Dassanowsky (1924–2007), singer and film producer
- Georg Decker (1818–1894), portrait artist
- Karl Decker (1921–2005), Austrian football player and manager
- Otto Erich Deutsch (1883–1967), musicologist
- Heinrich Elbogen (1872–1927), Austrian sports shooter who competed in the 1912 Summer Olympics
- Falco, civil name Johann (Hans) Hölzel (1957–1998), rock singer
- Anton Dominik Fernkorn (1813–1878), sculptor
- Leopold Figl (1902–1965), statesman
- Anton Filkuka (1888–1957), artist
- Viktor Frankl (1905–1997), neurologist, psychiatrist, and Holocaust survivor
- Egon Friedell (1878–1938), Austrian philosopher, historian, journalist, actor, cabaret performer, and theatre critic
- Edgar Froese (1944–2015), musician, artist, composer
- Dorothea Gerard (1855–1915), novelist
- Carl von Ghega (1802–1860), engineer
- Alexander Girardi (1850–1918), actor
- Christoph Willibald Gluck (1714–1787), composer
- Karl Goldmark (1830–1915), composer
- Alfred Grünfeld (1852–1924), pianist
- Cecil van Haanen (1844–1914), artist
- Baron Theophil von Hansen (1813–1891), architect
- Anton Heiller (1923–1979), organist and composer
- Johann von Herbeck (1831–1877), composer
- Hysni Curri (?–1925), Albanian revolutionary
- Gert Jonke (1946–2009), poet, playwright and novelist
- Curd Jürgens (1912–1982), actor
- Emmerich Kálmán (1882–1953), composer
- Vera Karalli (1889–1972), ballerina and actress
- Siavash Kasrai (1927–1996), Persian Marxist poet
- Wilhelm Kienzl (1857–1941), composer
- Thomas Klestil (1932–2004), Austrian president (1992–2004)
- Bruno Kreisky (1911–1990), statesman
- Karl Kraus (1874–1936), writer
- Werner Johannes Krauss (1884–1959), stage and film actor
- Hedy Lamarr (1914–2000), actress and inventor
- Joseph Lanner (1801–1843), composer
- Lotte Lehmann (1888–1976), opera singer
- György Ligeti (1923–2006), composer
- Theo Lingen (1903–1978), actor/director
- Emanuel List (1888–1967), opera singer
- Guido von List (1848–1919) 19th-century mystic Germanic and Runic revivalist
- Adolf Loos (1870–1933), architect
- Max Lorenz (1901–1975), German tenor
- Mehmed Šakir Kurtćehajić (1844–1872), Bosnian journalist
- Luigi Lucheni (1873–1910), Italian assassin
- Karl Lueger (1844–1910), politician
- Julius Madritsch (1906–1984), Austrian Righteous Among the Nations
- Hans Moser (1880–1964), actor
- Siegfried Marcus (1831–1898), automobile pioneer
- Karl Millöcker (1842–1899), composer
- Karl Eugen Neumann (1865–1915), European pioneer of Buddhism
- Walter Nowotny (1920–1944), World War II Luftwaffe pilot
- Leopold Oser (1839–1910), physician and gastrologist
- Georg Wilhelm Pabst (1885–1967), film director
- Joseph Petzval (1807–1891), mathematics professor and noted photographic inventor
- Ida Laura Pfeiffer (1797–1858), explorer
- Hans Pfitzner (1869–1949), composer
- Clemens von Pirquet (1874–1929), scientist and pediatrician
- Paula von Preradović (1887–1951), writer
- Helmut Qualtinger (1928–1986), actor
- Julius Raab (1891–1964), statesman
- Geli Raubal (1908–1931), Adolf Hitler's half-niece
- Karl Renner (1870–1950), statesman
- Richard Réti (1889–1929), chess grandmaster
- Josef Karl Richter (1880–1933), composer
- Hans Riemer (1901–1963), politician
- Albert Salomon von Rothschild (1844–1911), financier
- Nathaniel Mayer Anselm von Rothschild (1836–1905), financier
- Leonie Rysanek (1926–1998), opera singer
- Antonio Salieri (1750–1825), composer
- Friedrich Schilcher (1811–1881), painter
- Franz Schmidt (1874–1939), composer
- Arthur Schnitzler (1862–1931), writer
- Johann Schnitzler (1835–1893), laryngologist
- Arnold Schoenberg (1874–1951), composer
- Franz Schubert (1797–1828), composer
- Margarete Schütte-Lihotzky (1897–2000), architect
- David Schwarz (1852–1897) aviation pioneer
- Alma Seidler (1899–1977), actress
- Ignaz Seipel (1876–1932), statesman, Austrian chancellor
- Matthias Sindelar (1903–1939), footballer
- Robert Stolz (1880–1975), composer
- Eduard Strauss (1835–1916), composer
- Johann Strauss I (1804–1849), composer
- Johann Strauss II (1825–1899), composer
- Josef Strauss (1827–1870), composer
- Franz von Suppé (1819–1895), composer
- Heinrich Schenker (1868–1935), music theorist
- Friedrich Torberg (1908–1979), writer
- Julius Wagner-Jauregg (1857-1940), winner of the 1927 Nobel Prize in Physiology or Medicine
- Kurt Waldheim (1918–2007), U.N secretary-general, Austrian president
- Franz Werfel (1890–1945), poet
- Franz West (1947–2012), artist
- Auguste Wilbrandt-Baudius (1843–1937), German-Austrian actress and journalist
- Anton Wildgans (1881–1932), poet
- Wilhelm Winternitz (1835–1917), hydropathist and neurologist
- Hugo Wolf (1860–1903), composer
- Fritz Wotruba (1907–1975), sculptor
- Joe Zawinul (1932–2007), jazz keyboardist and composer
- Alexander von Zemlinsky (1871–1942), composer
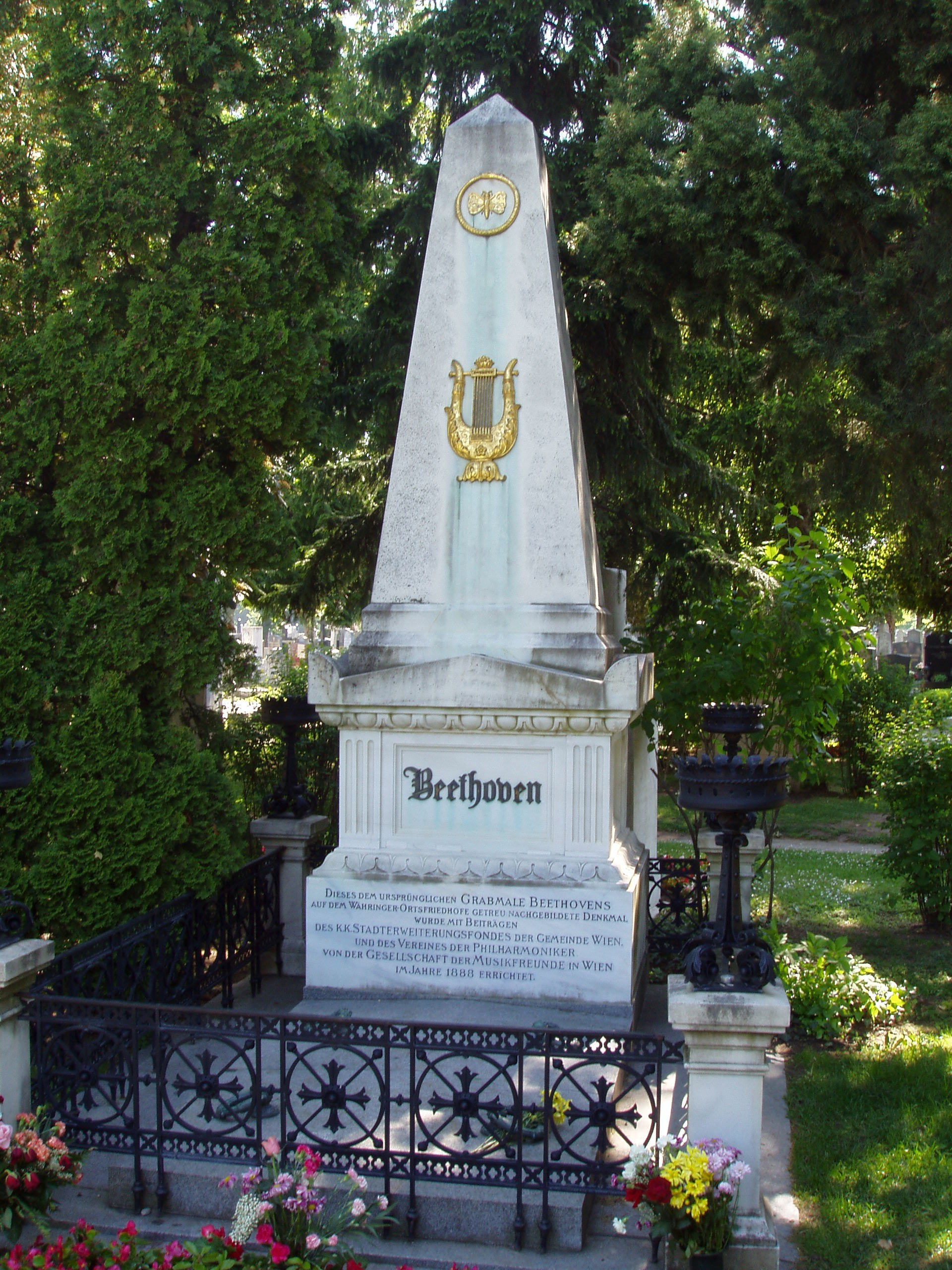
Ludwig van Beethoven's grave

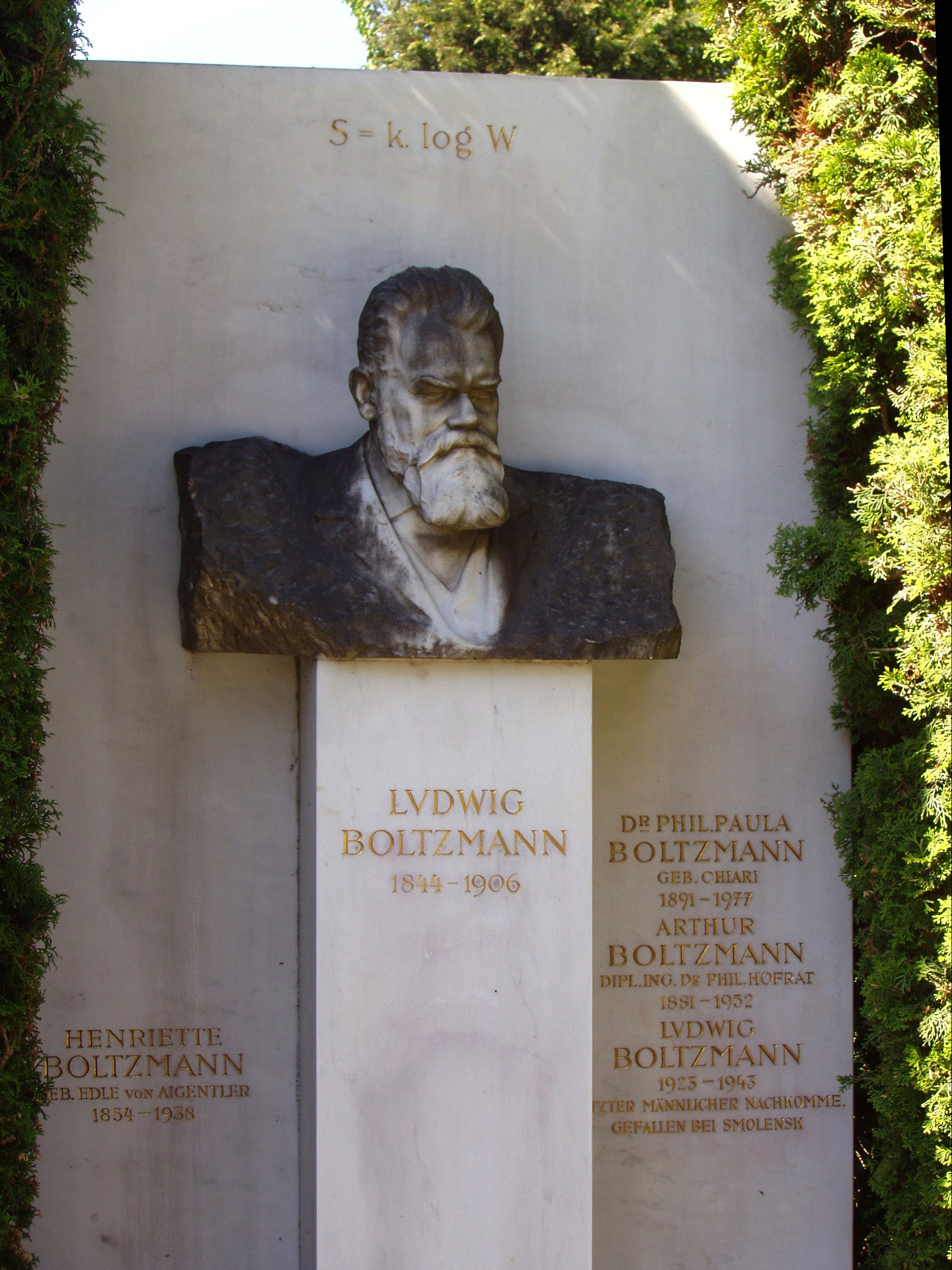
Ludwig Boltzmann's grave

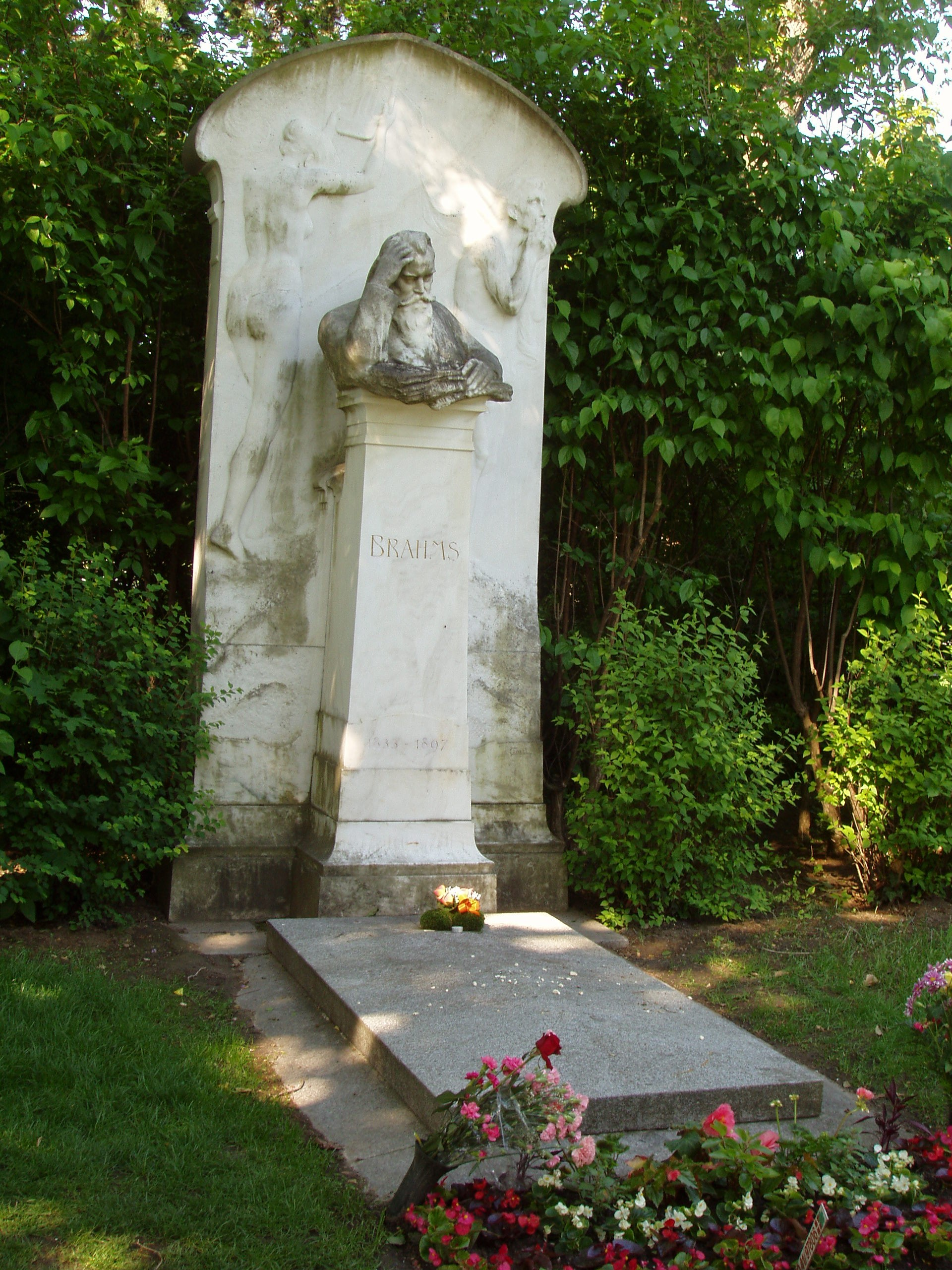
Johannes Brahms's grave

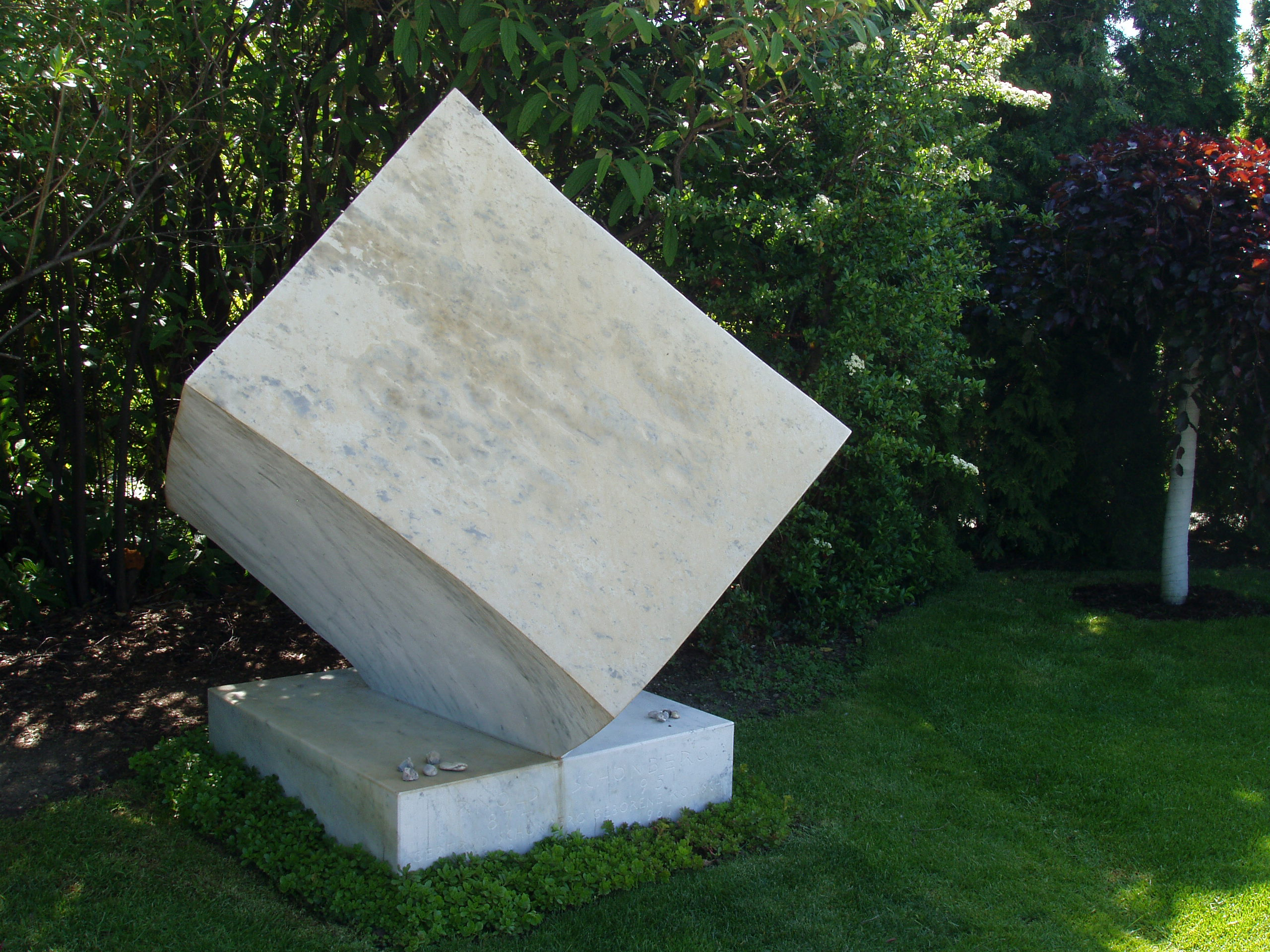
Arnold Schoenberg's grave

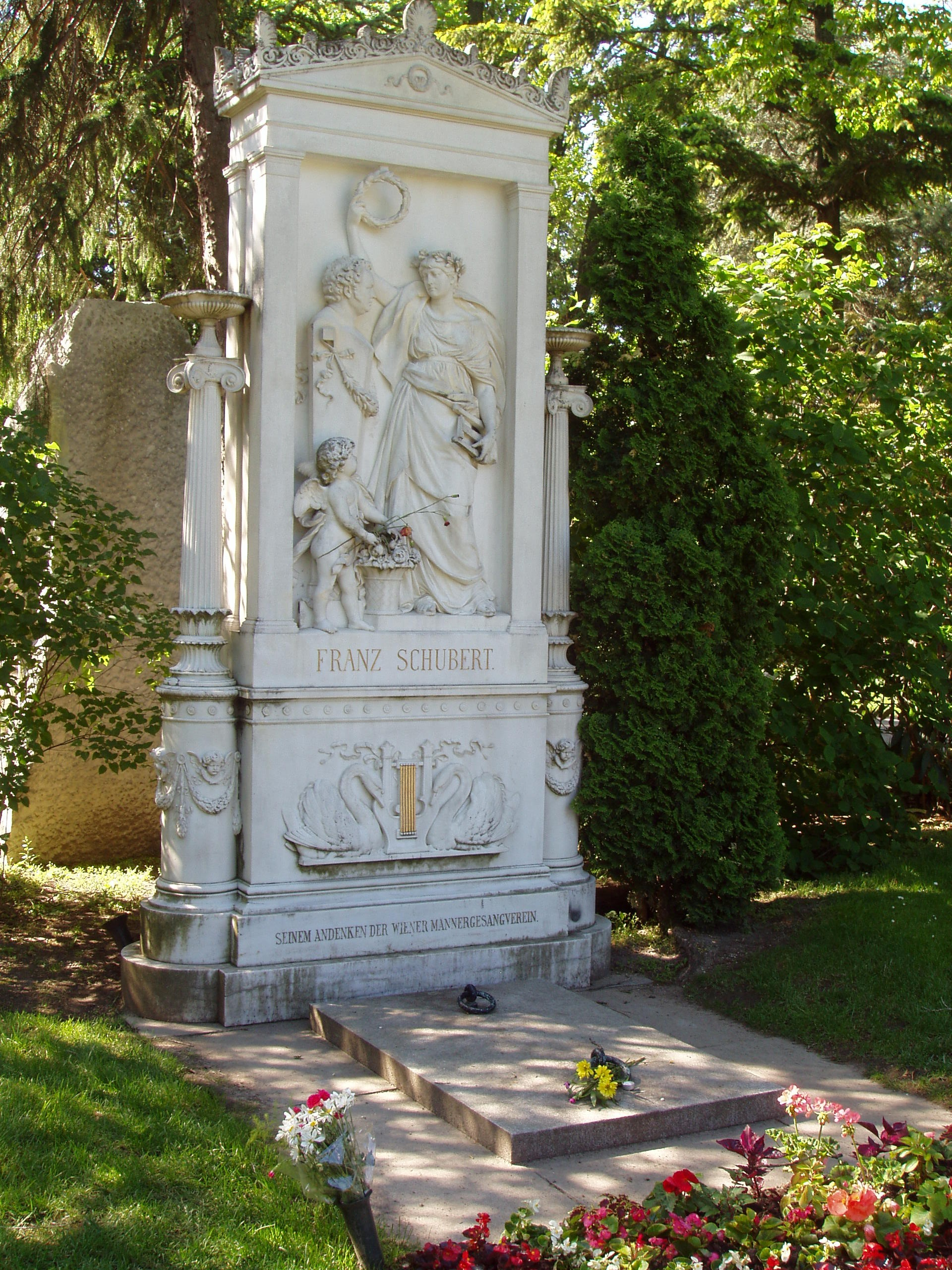
Franz Schubert's grave

Johann Strauss' I grave

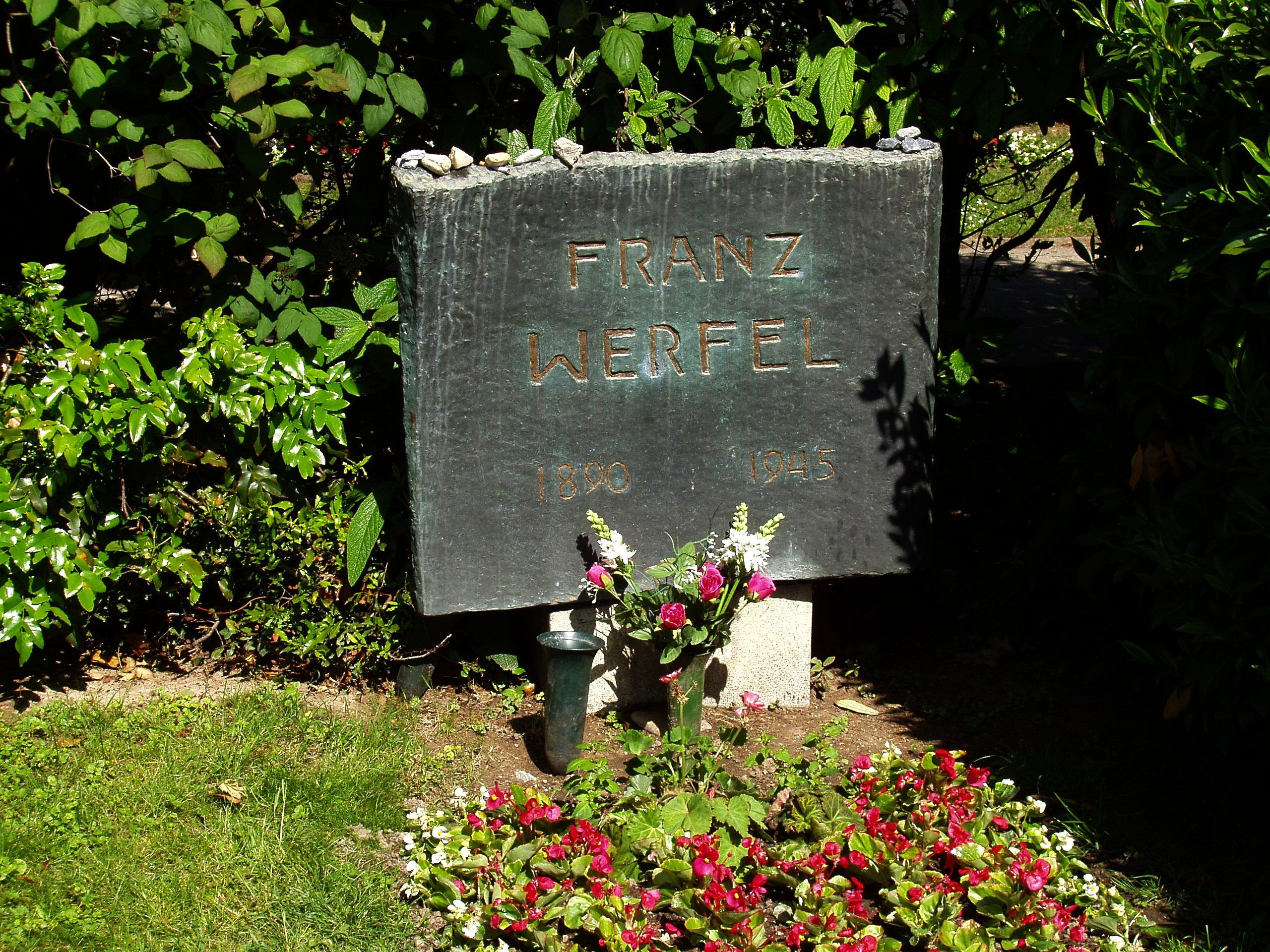
Franz Werfel's grave

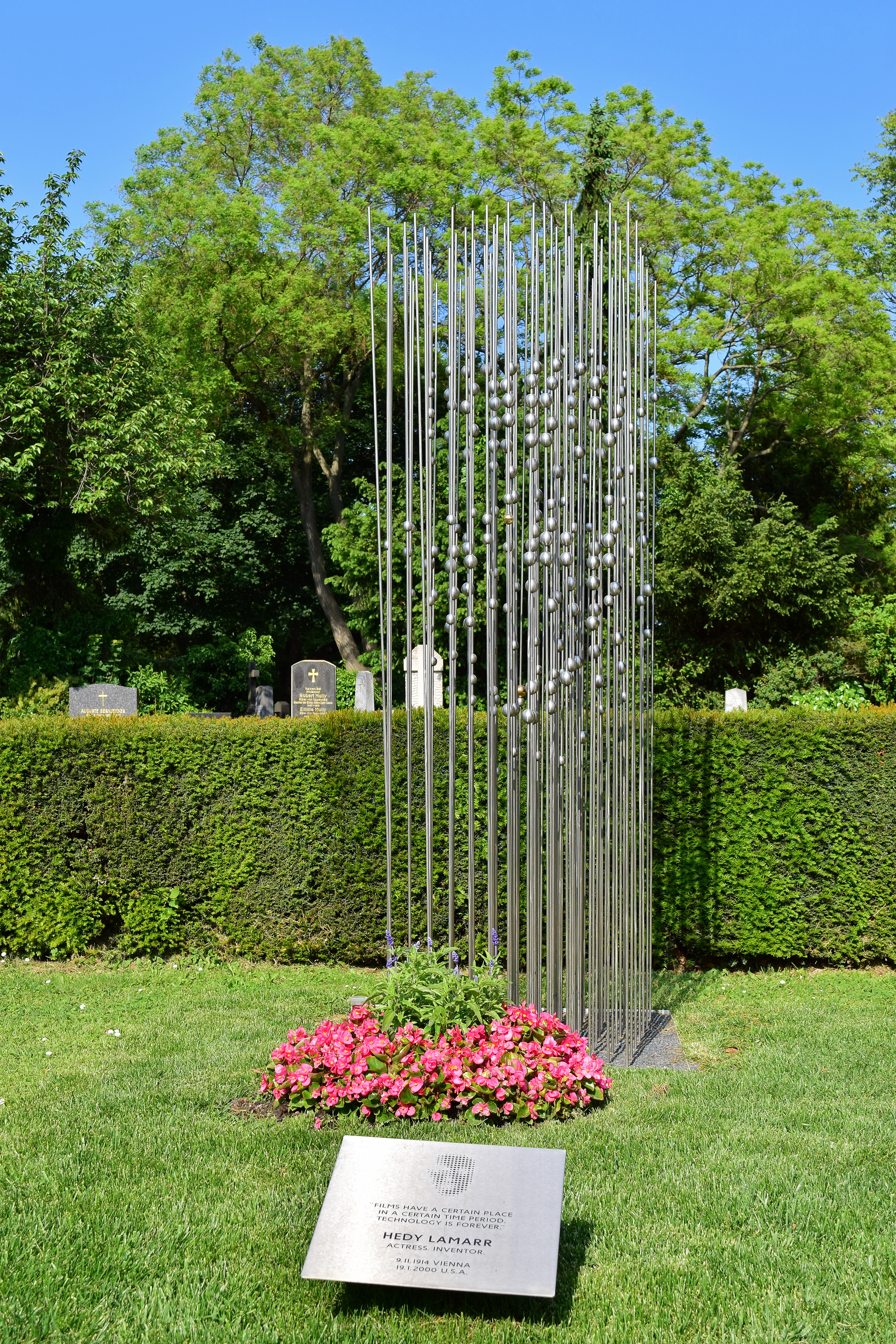
Hedy Lamarr's grave

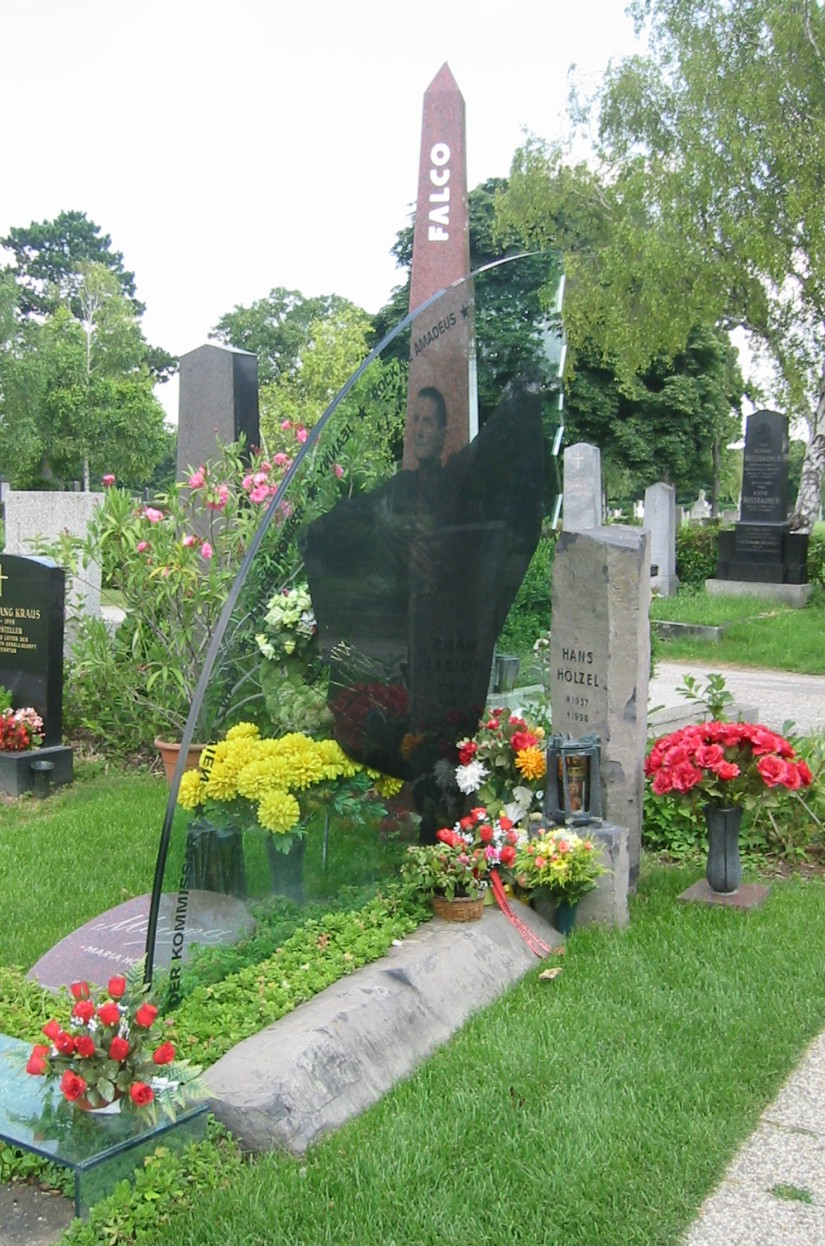
Falco's grave

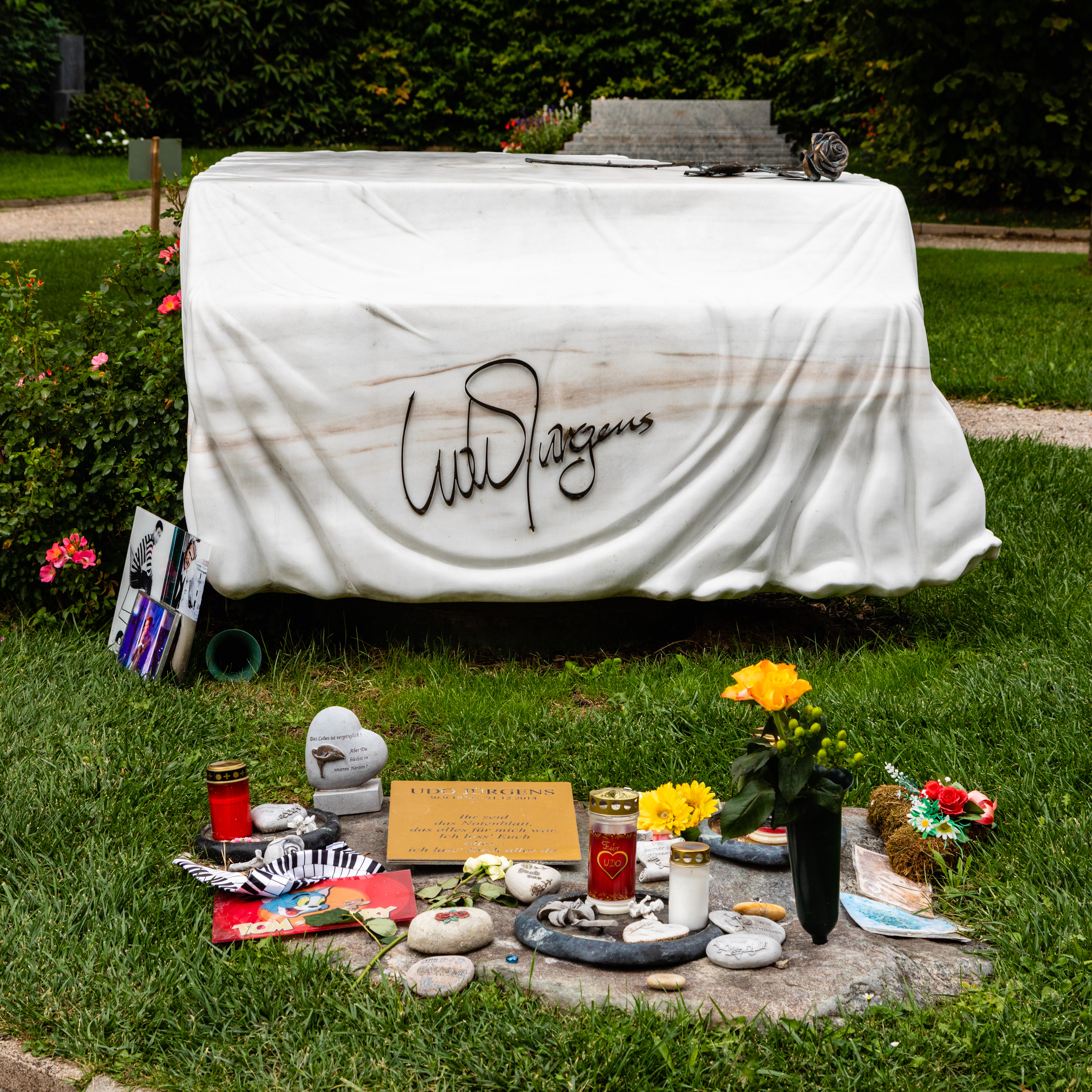
Udo Jürgens's grave

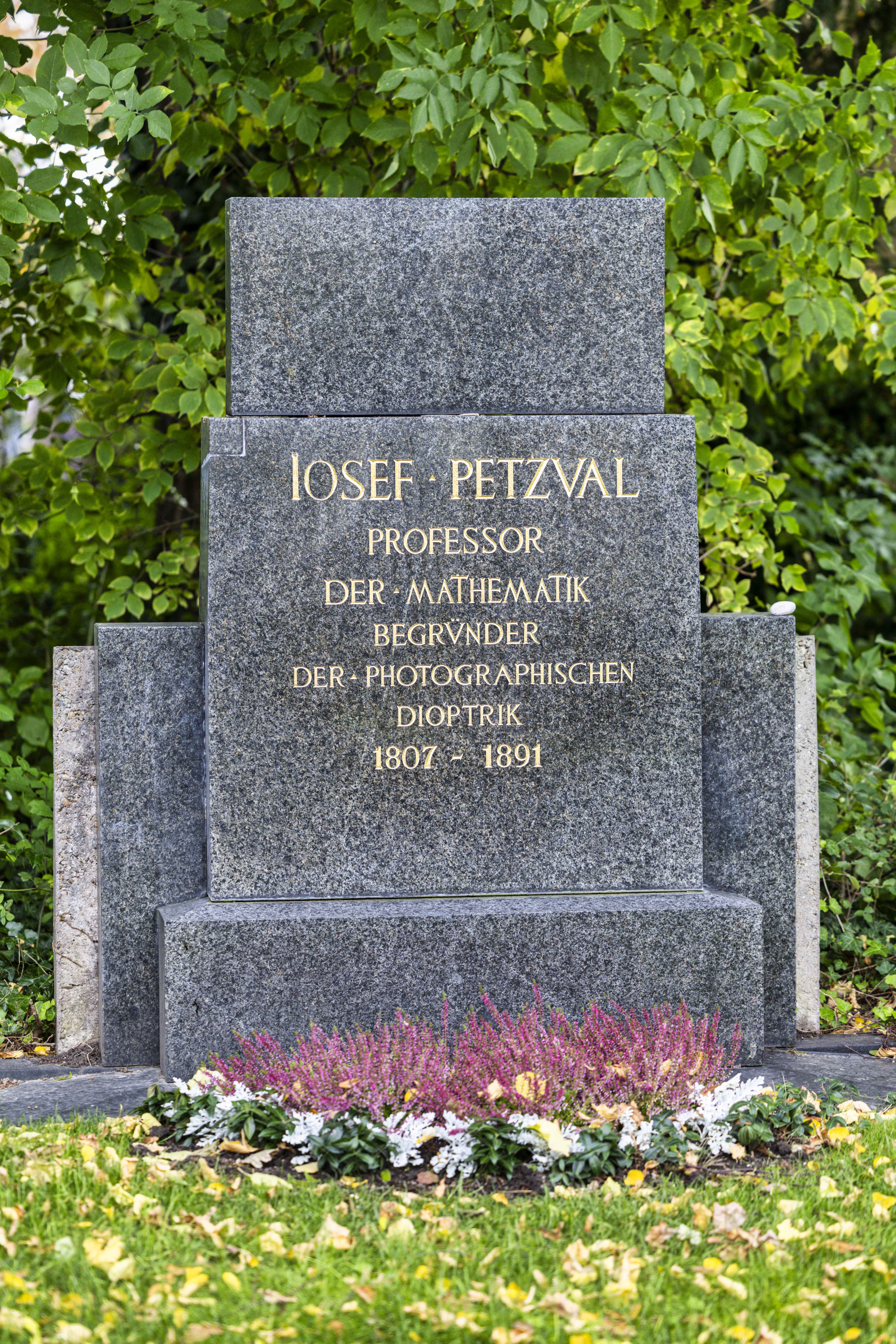
Joseph Petzval's grave
