= Johann Schnitzler =

Austrian laryngologist and professor

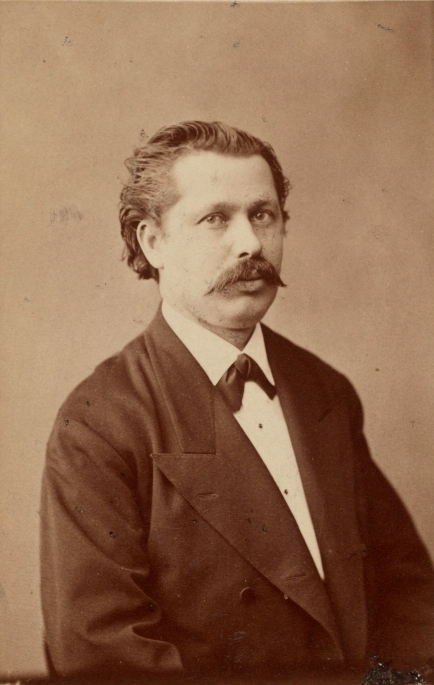
Johann Schnitzler, c. 1875

Johann Schnitzler (10 April 1835 – 2 May 1893) was an Austrian laryngologist and professor. He was the father of Arthur Schnitzler.

== Life and work ==
Johann Schnitzler, son of a carpenter, was a native of Groß-Kanizsa, now known as Nagykanizsa in Hungary (then part of the Austrian Empire). He studied medicine at the universities of Budapest and Vienna, where in 1860 he earned his medical doctorate and from 1863 to 1867 worked as an assistant to Johann von Oppolzer (1808–1871). He habilitated for percussion, auscultation and illnesses of respiratory organs in 1864. Schnitzler was among the founders of the General Polyclinic Vienna in 1872 and became head of its laryngological department. In 1880 he was appointed associate professor of laryngology at the University of Vienna, and in 1884 became medical director of the polyclinic.

He married Luise Markbreiter (1838–1911), daughter of the renowned Viennese doctor Philipp Markbreiter, and they had four children: the doctor and playwright Arthur Schnitzler (1862–1931); Joseph Emil, who died shortly after his birth in 1864; Julius Schnitzler (1865–1939), who also was a surgeon and professor; and Gisela (1867–1953).

Schnitzler was a pioneer of modern laryngology, the author of numerous works and specialist articles on diseases of the throat and larynx. His best known written work was Klinischer Atlas der Laryngologie ("Clinical Atlas of Laryngology"), which was published posthumously in 1895. In 1860, with Philipp Markbreiter (1810–1882), he founded the Wiener Medizinische Presse, a publication of which he remained as editor until 1886. His reputation as laryngologist made him a sought after physician in theatre circles; likewise his son Arthur cared for celebrated actors like Adolf von Sonnenthal and Charlotte Wolter, and numerous singers of the Viennese Court Opera.

Johann Schnitzler died in Vienna aged 58 and was buried in the Wiener Zentralfriedhof cemetery. His son Arthur perpetuated parts of his life in the 1912 drama Professor Bernhardi.

Schnitzler is credited with coining the term "spastic dysphonia" for a vocal disorder known today as spasmodic dysphonia (SD).
