= Johann Ritter von Oppolzer =

Bohemian physician (1808–1871)

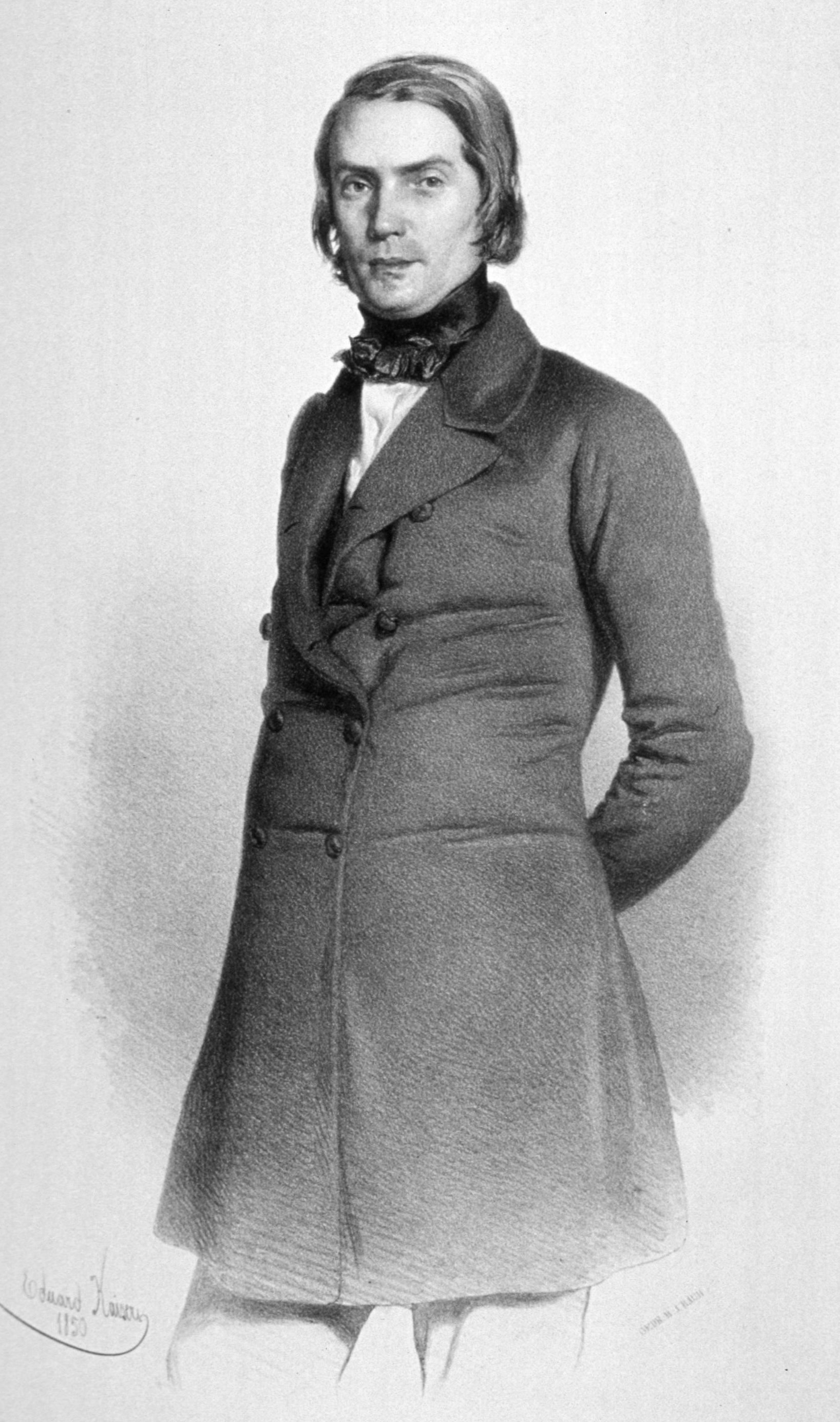
Johann Ritter von Oppolzer. 1850 lithograph by Eduard Kaiser.

Johann Ritter von Oppolzer (4 August 1808 – 16 April 1871) was a medical doctor born in Nové Hrady, Bohemia. He was the father of the astronomer Theodor von Oppolzer (1841–1886).

In 1835 he earned his medical doctorate at the University of Prague, and later worked as a university professor at Prague (from 1841), Leipzig (from 1848) and Vienna (from 1850), where he also served as rector in 1860/61. In 1863, he was elected a foreign member of the Royal Swedish Academy of Sciences.

Oppolzer was an advocate of holistic diagnostics and therapy in his approach to medicine. He was also an important influence in the career of renowned otologist Adam Politzer.

== Selected writings ==
- Vorlesungen über spezielle Pathologie und Therapie, (Lectures on Special Pathology and Therapy); 2 volumes, 1866/1872.

== External Reference ==
- biography of Johann von Oppolzer @ AEIOU Encyclopedia
- Pagel: Biographical Dictionary (translated biography)
