= Wilhelm Winternitz =

Czech-Austrian physician and hydropathis born in 1835

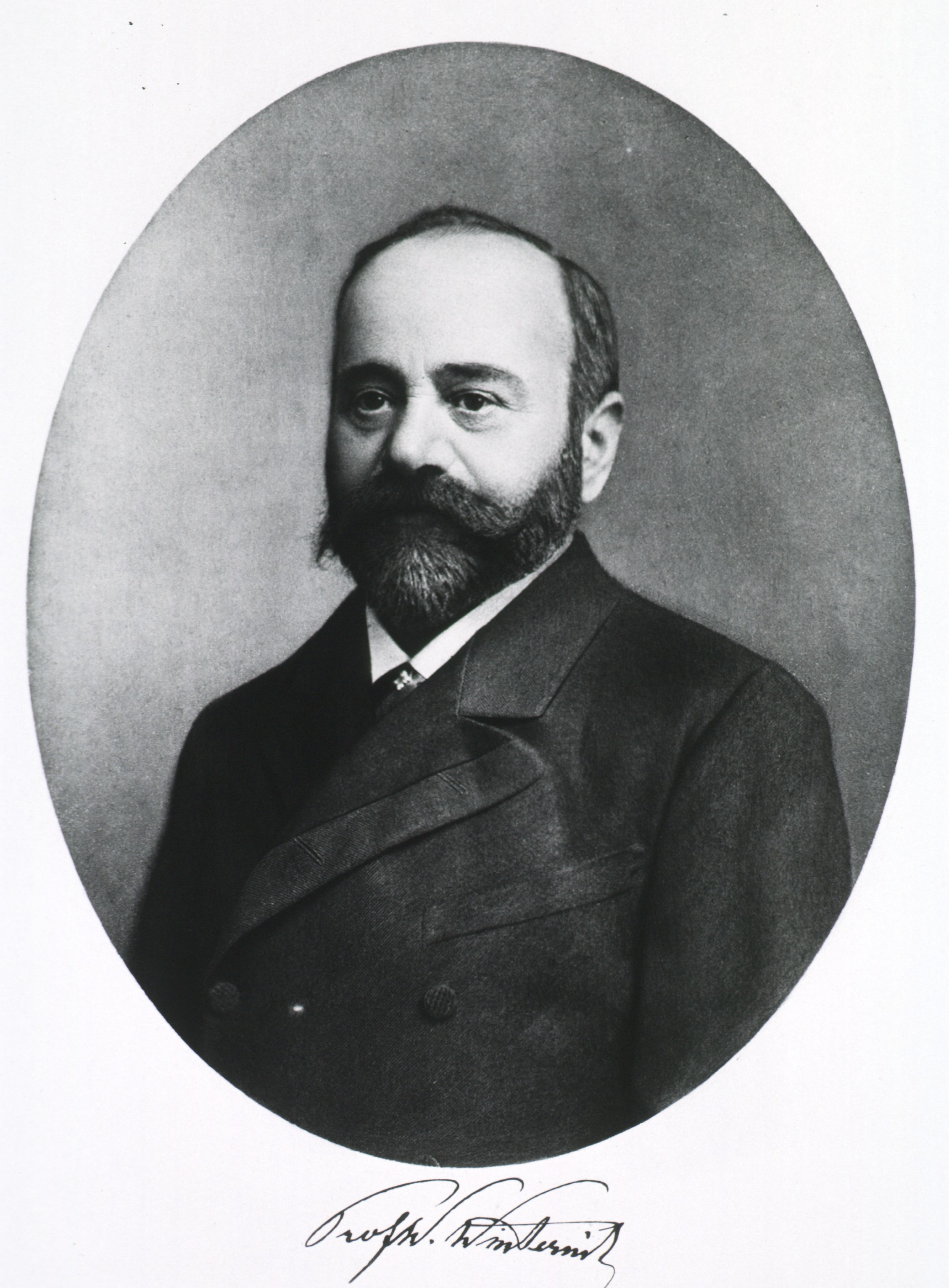
Winternitz in 1895

Wilhelm Winternitz (1 March 1835, Josefov (Jaroměř) Josefstadt (now a part of Jaroměř, Okres Náchod), Bohemia – 22 February 1917, Vienna) was a Czech-Austrian Jewish physician and hydropathist. He was an influential neurologist and hydropathist who at the time was commonly characterized as "the father of scientific hydrotherapy".

== Biography ==
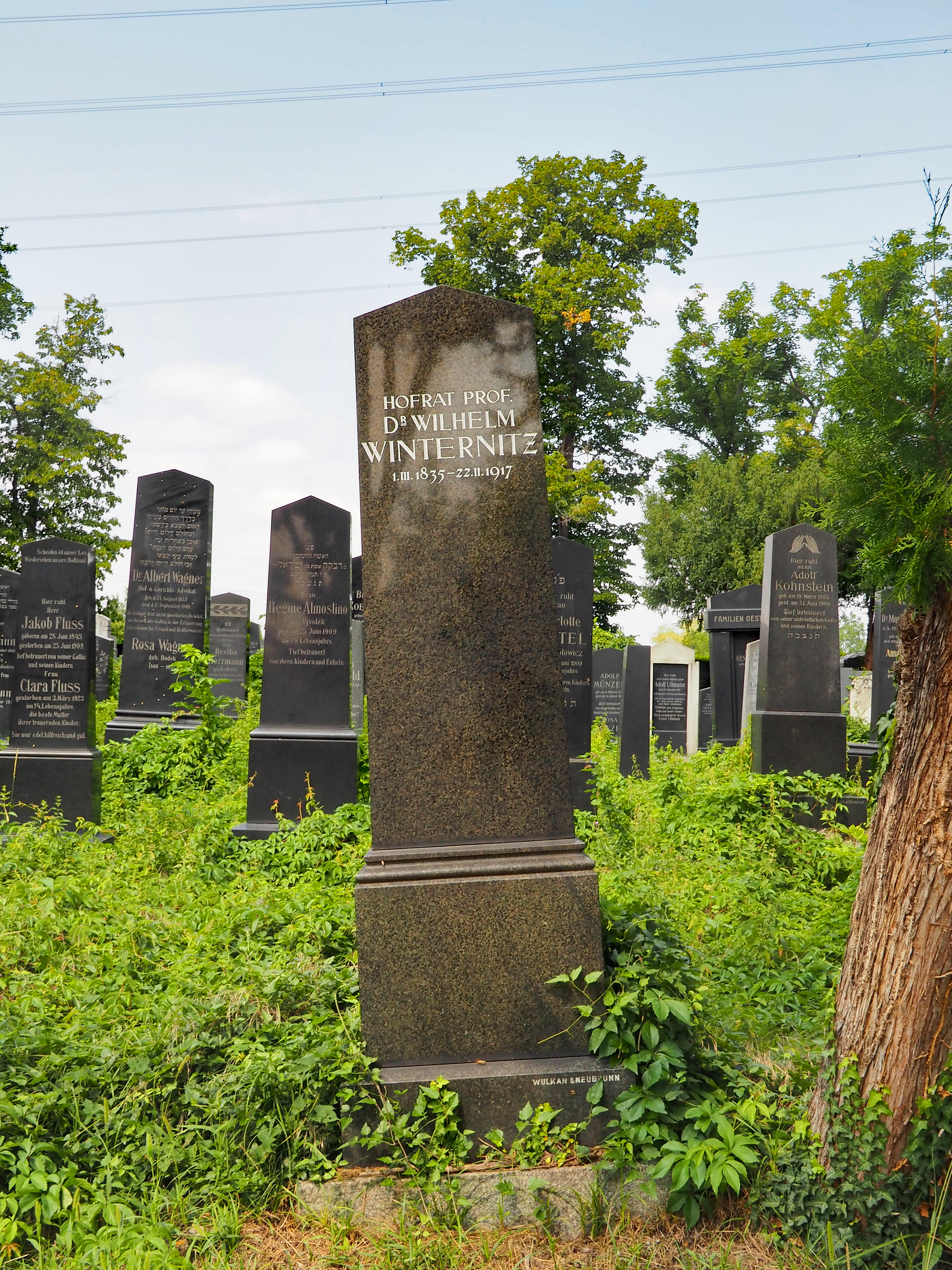
Gravestone of Winternitz in the Wiener Zentralfriedhof

Winternitz was educated at Vienna and at Prague (M. D. 1857), where he settled and became an assistant at the institute for the insane. In 1858 he entered the Austrian Navy, but resigned his position as surgeon in 1861 and established a practice in Vienna. There he became interested in hydropathy, and was soon regarded as one of the leading authorities. Admitted to the medical faculty of the University of Vienna as privat-docent for hydropathy in 1865, he was one of the founders of the General Vienna Dispensary, where by 1905 he had become departmental chief. In the same year (1865?) he opened a private hospital at Kaltenleutgeben, near Vienna. One of the people influenced by Winternitz was one of the Kellogg brothers involved in the Battle Creek Sanitarium. In 1874 Winternitz became privat-docent in medicine, and was appointed assistant professor seven years later, becoming a full professor in 1899.

Winternitz was a collaborator for hydropathy on Von Ziemssen's Handbuch der Allgemeinen Therapie (ed. 1881), Albert Eulenburg's Realencyclopädie der Gesammten Heilkunde (ed. 1897), and Eulenburg's Lehrbuch der Allgemeinen Therapie und der Therapeutischen Methodik (Berlin, 1898–99). In 1890 he founded the Blätter für Klinische Hydrotherapie, of which he was still the editor in 1905.

Winternitz advocated a strict milk diet to treat diabetes.

== Works ==
In addition to several essays and monographs in medical journals, Winternitz was the author of the following works:

- Kaltenleutgeben und Meine Wasserheilanstalt (Vienna, 1869)
- Die Hydropathie auf Physiologischer und Klinischer Grundlage (ib. 1877-80; 2d ed. 1890-92; translated into English, French, Italian, Spanish, and Russian)
- Cholera, Lungenphthise und Fieber: Klinische Studien (ib. 1887-88)

== See also ==
- Moriz Winternitz
