= Rothschild family residences =

Places occupied by members of the Rothschild family

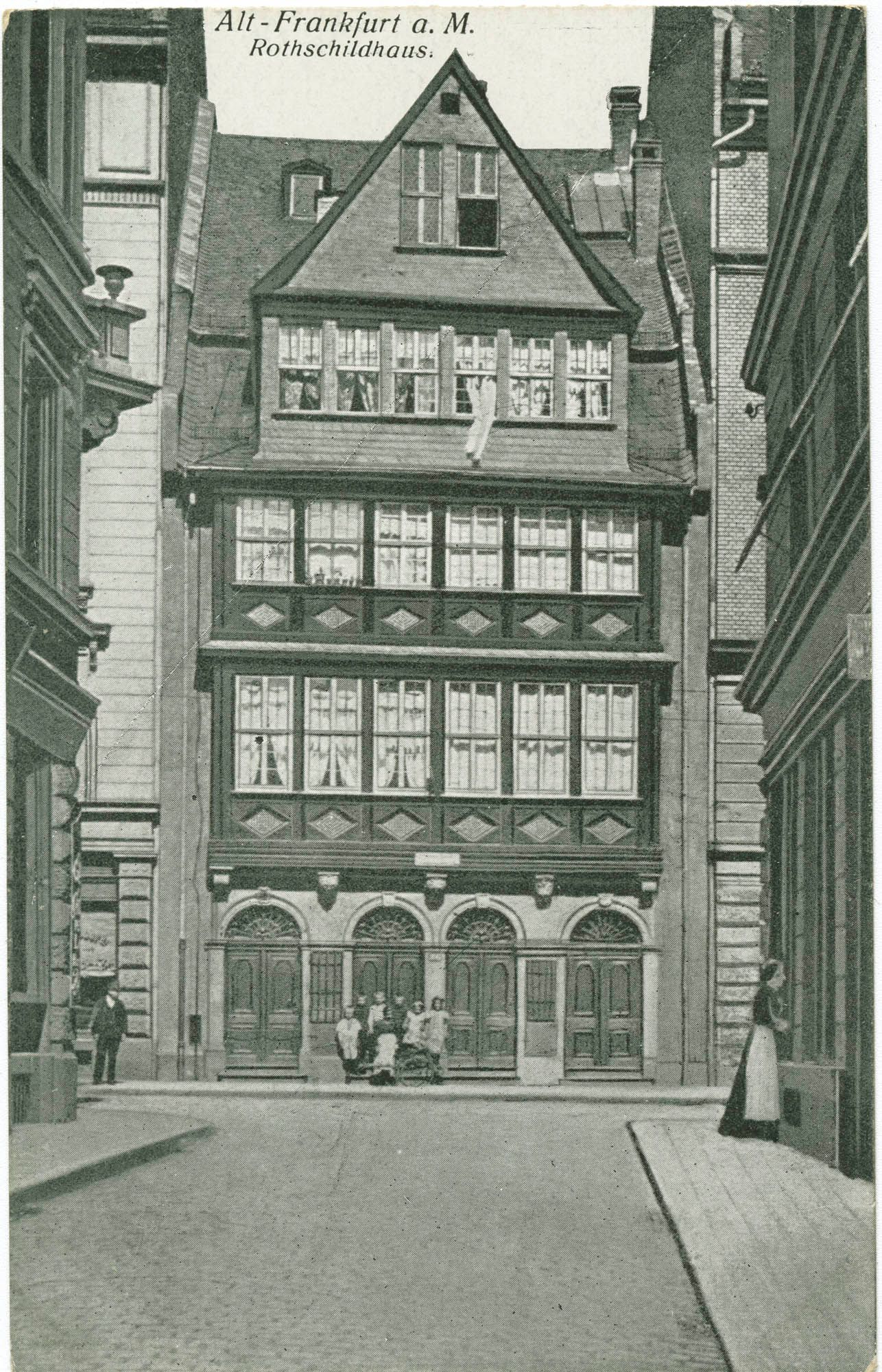
House of the Rothschild family, Judengasse, Frankfurt

The Rothschild family residences are palaces, castles and houses which are, or were, occupied by members of the Rothschild family in Europe.

== History ==
Coat of arms granted to Rothschild in 1822 by Emperor Francis I of Austria

The Rothschild family originated from Frankfurt. The family rose to prominence with Mayer Amschel Rothschild, who established his banking business in the 1760s. Rothschild was able to establish an international banking family through his five sons, who established businesses in Paris, Frankfurt, London, Vienna, and Naples. The family was elevated to noble rank in the Holy Roman Empire and the United Kingdom.

The family used their extraordinary wealth, considered the largest private fortune in the world, to acquire businesses in a diverse range of fields, including financial services, real estate, mining, energy, agriculture, winemaking. They also built or acquired a number of palaces, castles and houses throughout Europe, many of which remain standing today. In England, they owned a number of country seats in the home counties.

The Rothschild style, known as le goût Rothschild (French for 'the Rothschild taste'), describes a detailed, elaborate style of interior decoration during the nineteenth century. The Rothschild aesthetic and life-style later influenced other rich and powerful families, including the Astors, Vanderbilts and Rockefellers, and became hallmarks of the American Gilded Age. Aspects of le goût Rothschild continued into the twentieth century, affecting such designers as Yves Saint Laurent and Robert Denning.

== List of properties ==
=== Austria ===
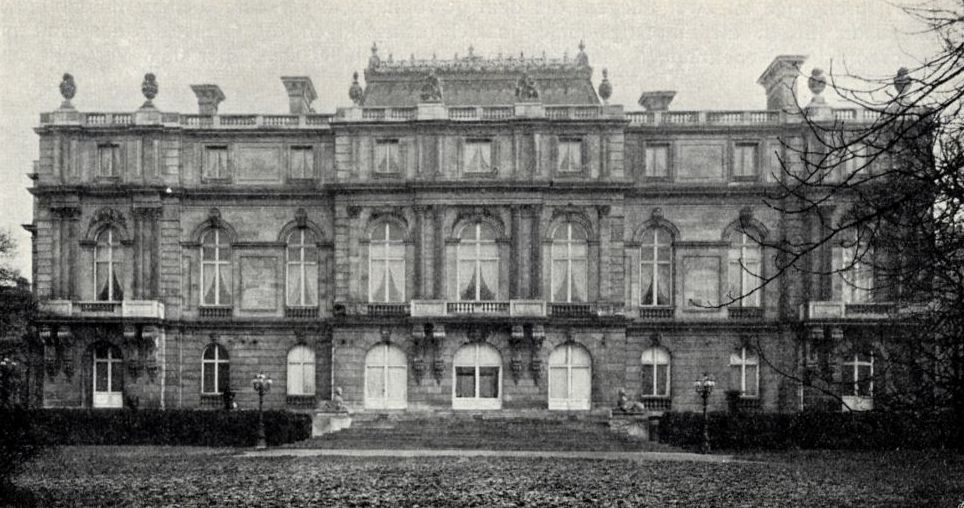
Palais Albert Rothschild, garden front, c. 1906

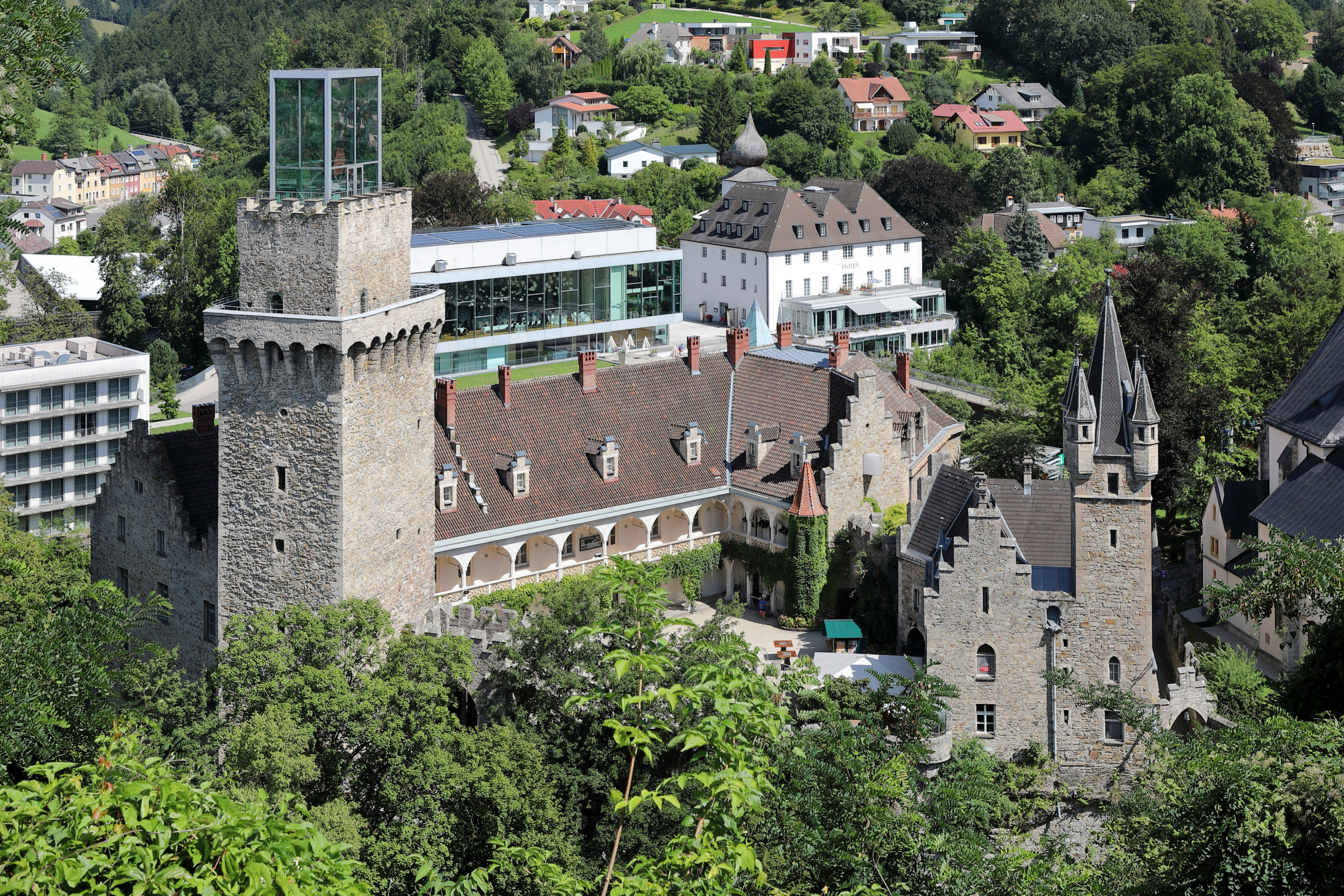
View of Rothschild Castle in Waidhofen an der Ybbs

==== Vienna ====
- Palais Rothschild
  - Palais Albert Rothschild
  - Palais Nathaniel Rothschild
  - Palais Rothschild (Metternichgasse)
  - Palais Rothschild (Prinz-Eugen-Straße)
  - Palais Rothschild (Renngasse)

==== Lower Austria ====
- Enzesfeld Castle
- Rothschild Castle (Waidhofen)
- Sitzenberg Castle
- Steinbach Castle (Göstling)

=== Czech Republic ===
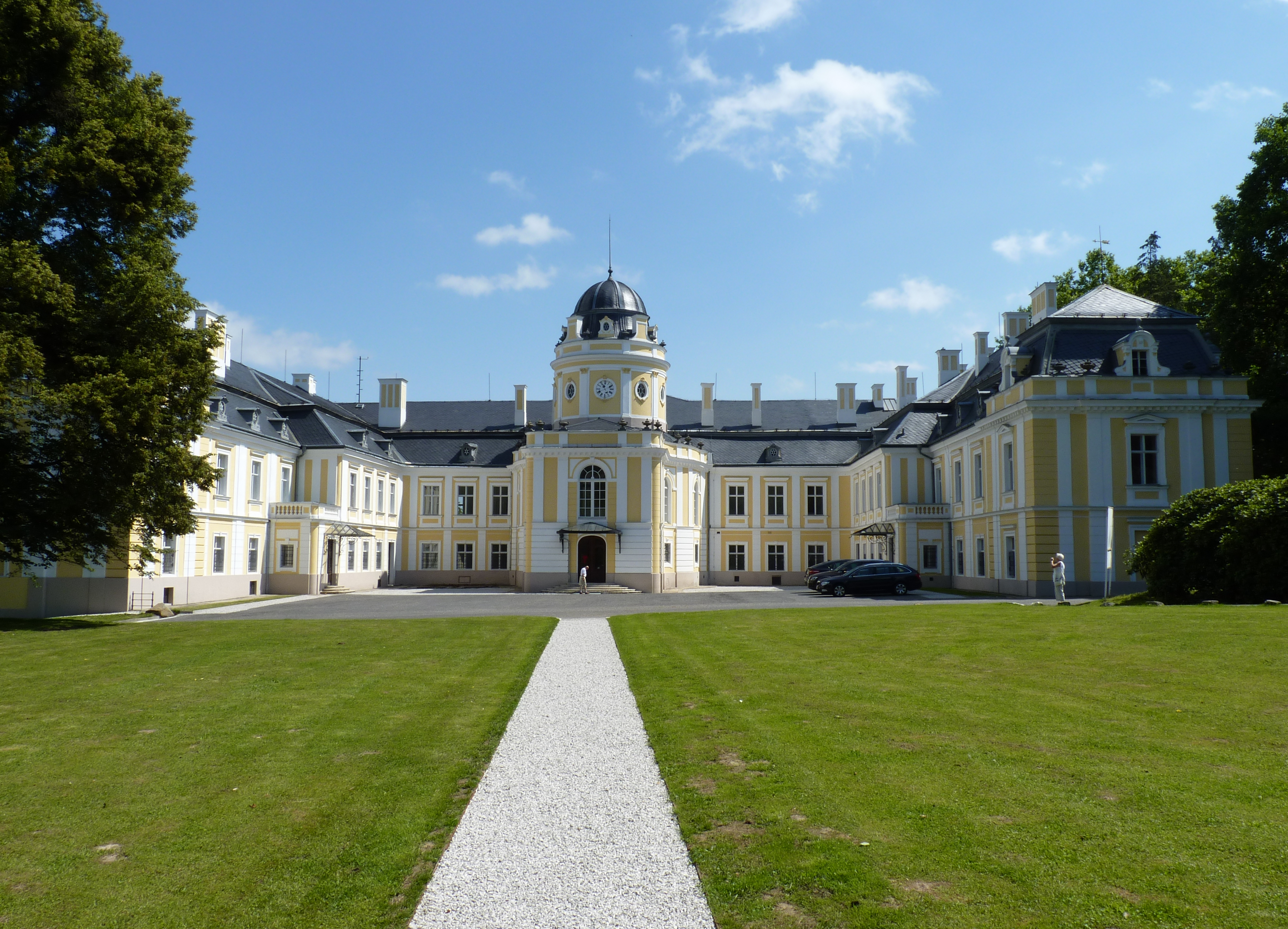
Šilheřovice Castle

- Šilheřovice Castle (also known as Schillersdorf Palace)

=== France ===
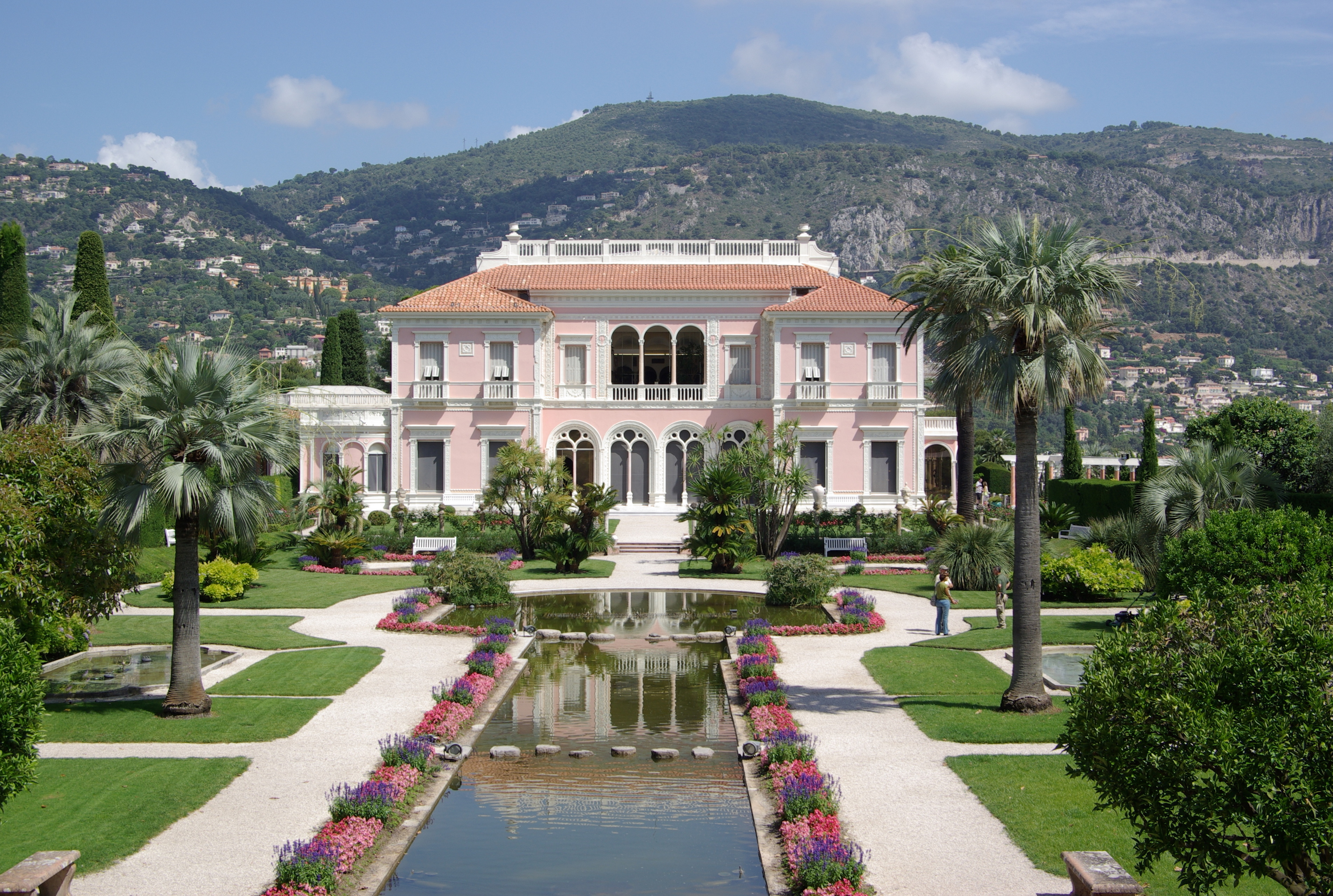
Villa Ephrussi de Rothschild, at Saint-Jean-Cap-Ferrat

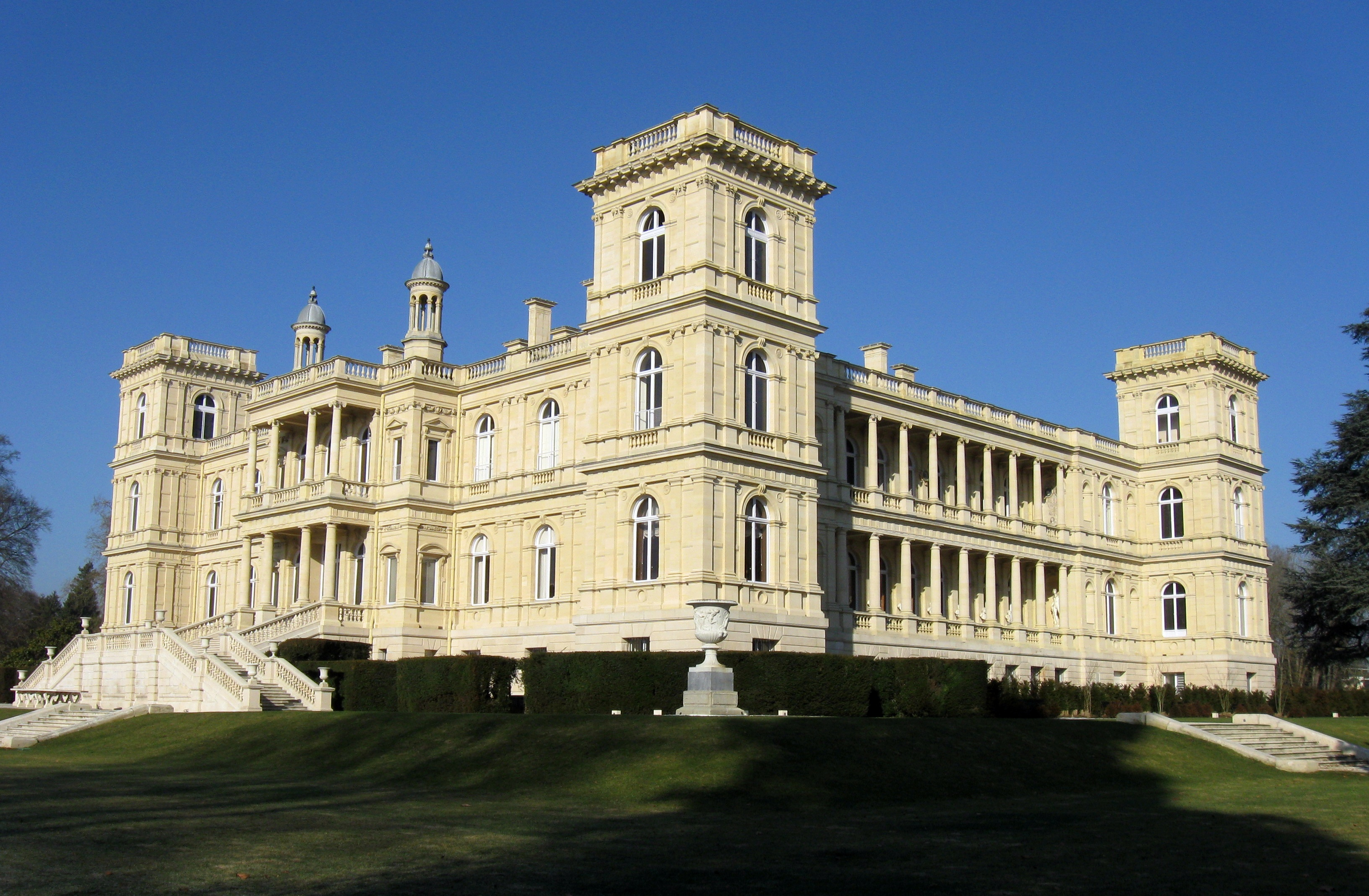
Château de Ferrières, Ferrières-en-Brie, Seine-et-Marne

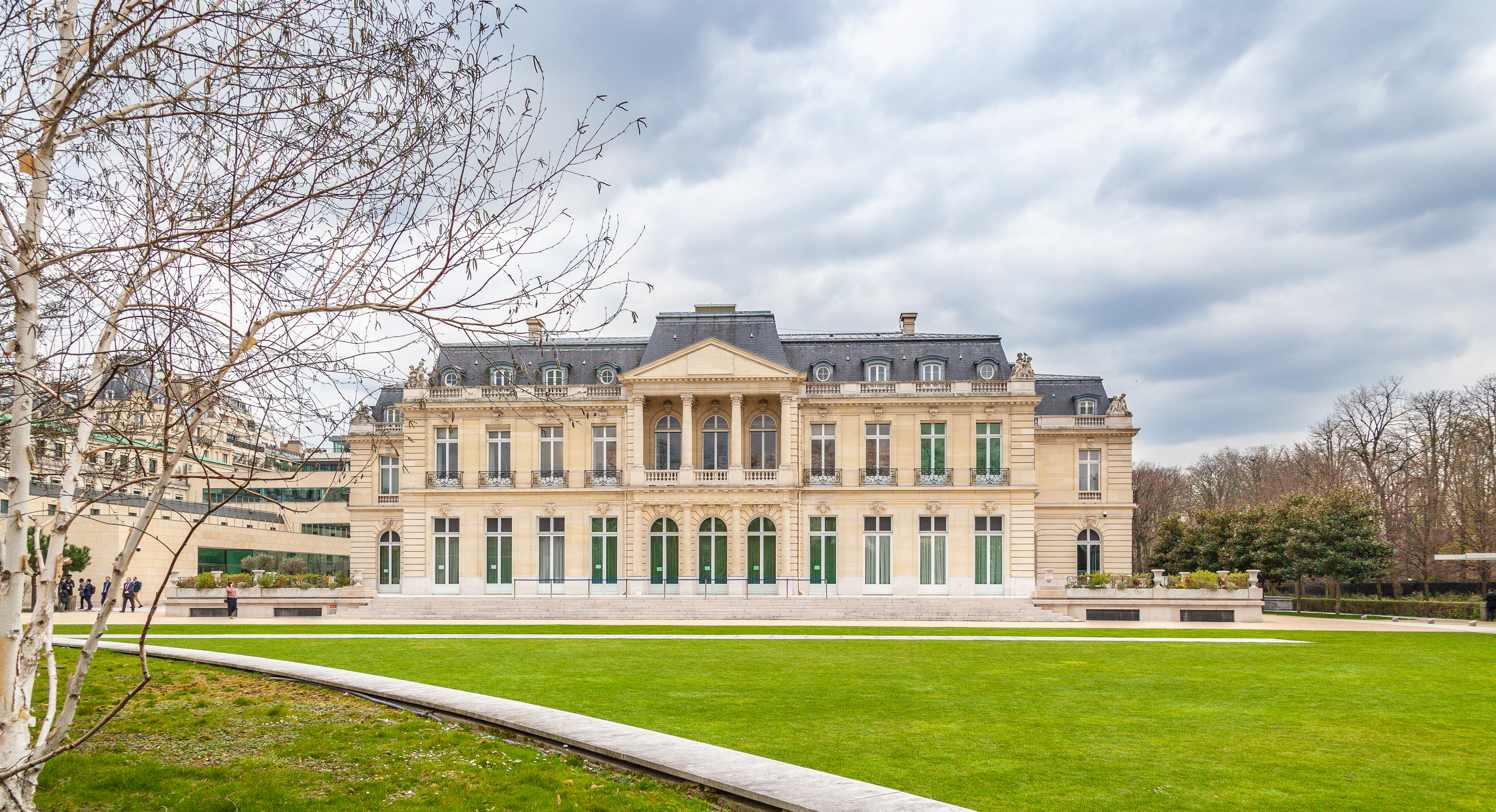
Château de la Muette, on the edge of the Bois de Boulogne in Paris

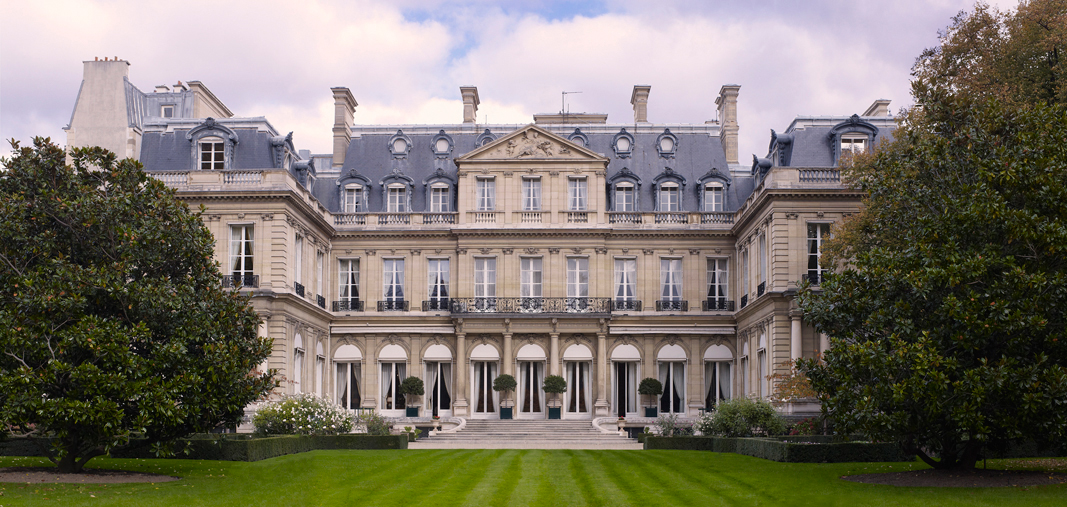
Hôtel de Pontalba, 8th arrondissement of Paris

==== Centre-Val de Loire ====
- Château d'Abondant

==== French Riviera ====
- Villa Ephrussi de Rothschild
- Villa Rothschild
- Villa Victoria (Grasse)

==== Hauts-de-France ====
- Château des Fontaines
- Château de Laversine
- Château de Montvillargenne
- Château de Vallière
- Laversine Park

==== Île-de-France ====
- Château d'Armainvilliers
- Château de Ferrières
- Château de la Guette
- Château de la Muette
- Château Rothschild
- Château de Suresnes
- Hôtel de Marigny
- Hôtel Perrinet de Jars
- Hôtel de Pontalba
- Hôtel Saint-Florentin
- Hotel Ephrussi-Rothschild
- Hôtel Lambert
- Hôtel Salomon de Rothschild
- Royaumont Abbey Palace
- Vaux-de-Cernay Abbey

==== Normandy ====
- Haras de Meautry
- Château de Reux
- Villa Strassburger

==== Nouvelle-Aquitaine ====
- Château d'Armailhac
- Château Clarke
- Château Duhart-Milon
- Château Lafite Rothschild
- Château des Laurets
- Château Mouton Rothschild

=== Germany ===
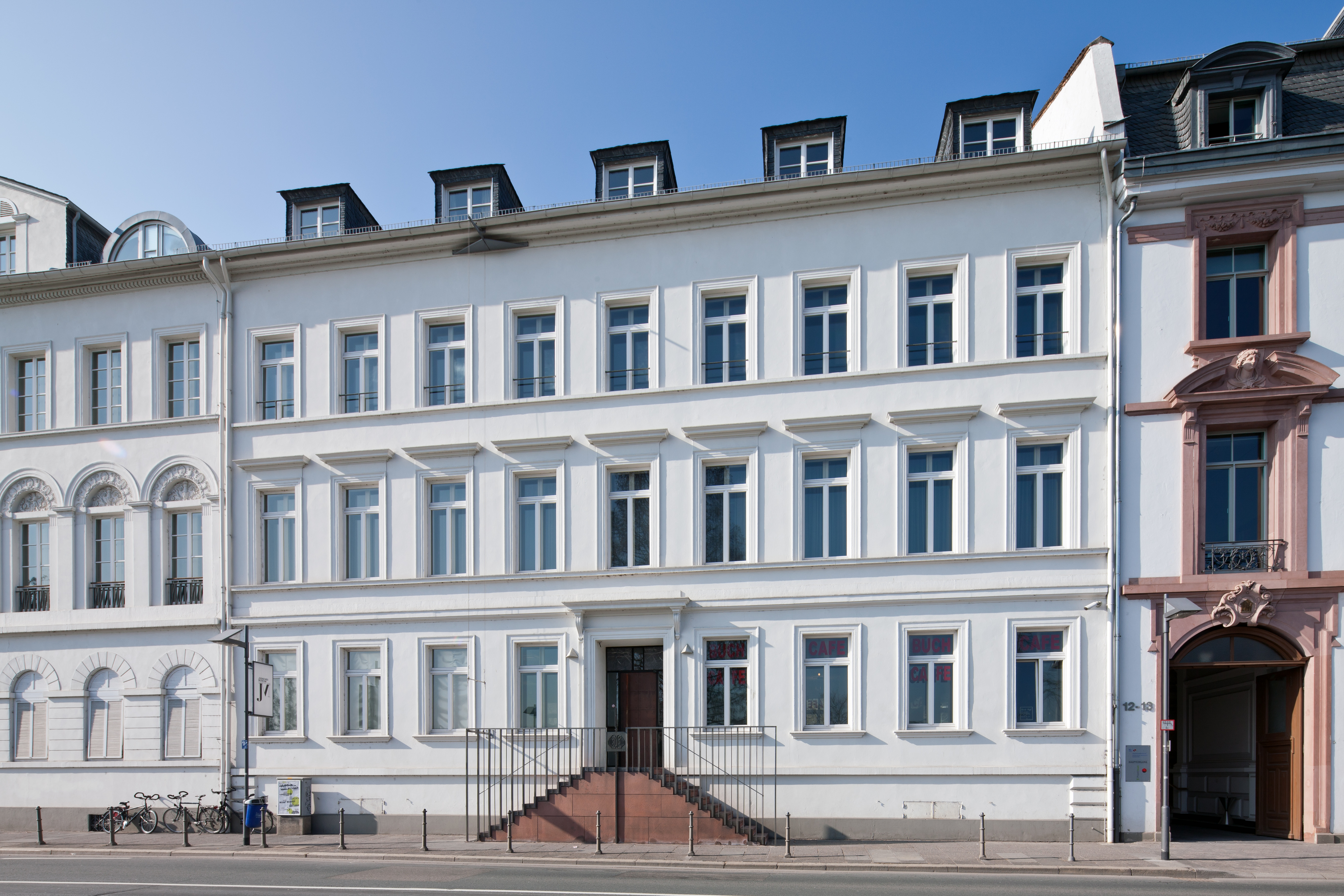
Rothschild Palace in Frankfurt

==== Hesse ====
- Rothschild Palace (Jewish Museum Frankfurt)
- Fahrgasse 146
- Rothschild-Goldschmidt Palace
- Rennhof Castle
- Villa Grüneburg
- Villa Günthersburg
- Villa Rothschild (Königstein)

==== Baden-Württemberg ====
- Rothschild Villa (Hemsbach)

=== Italy ===
==== Naples ====
- Villa Pignatelli

==== Venice ====
- Palazzo Cavalli-Franchetti

=== Netherlands ===
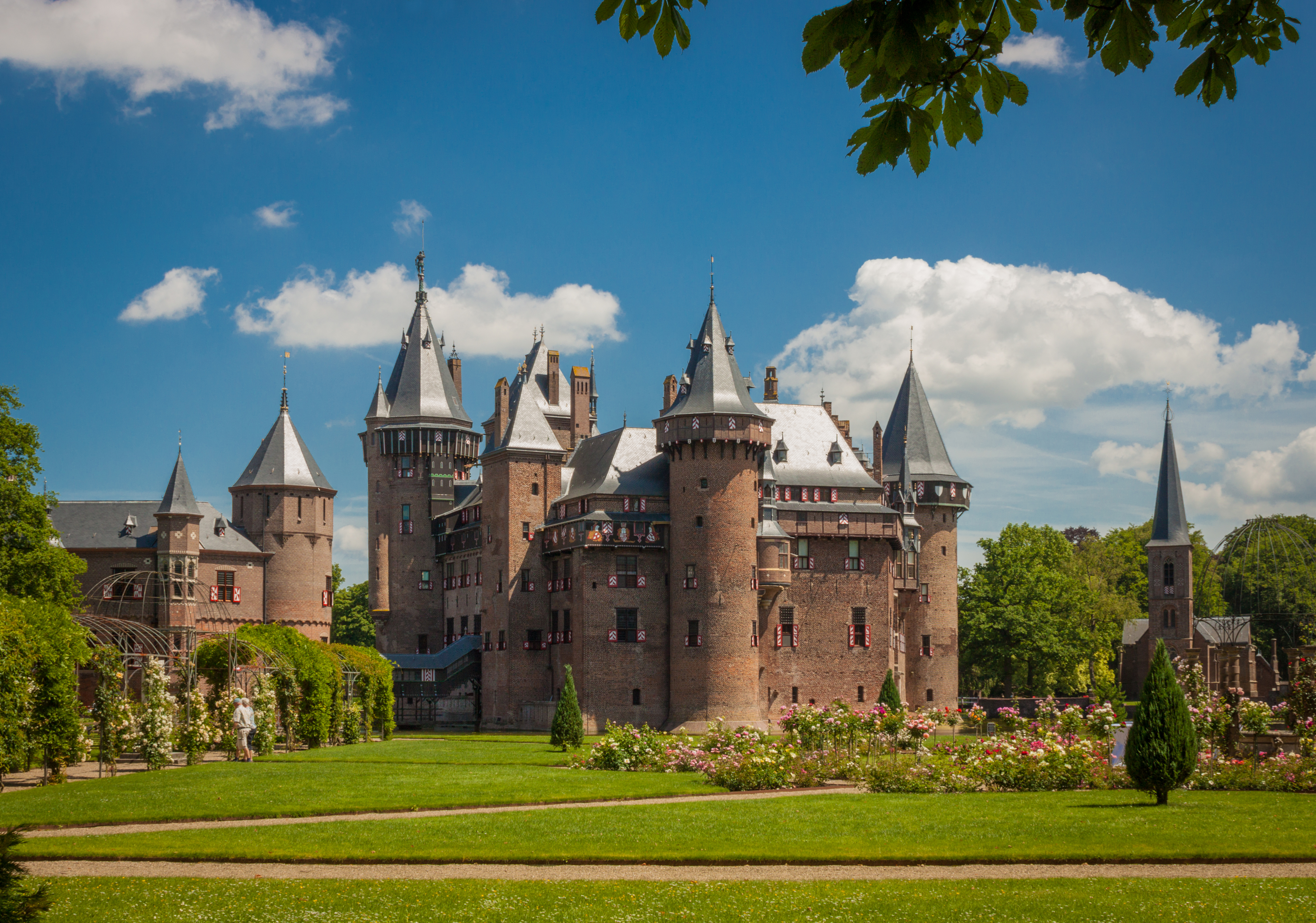
De Haar Castle, outside Utrecht

- De Haar Castle

=== Switzerland ===
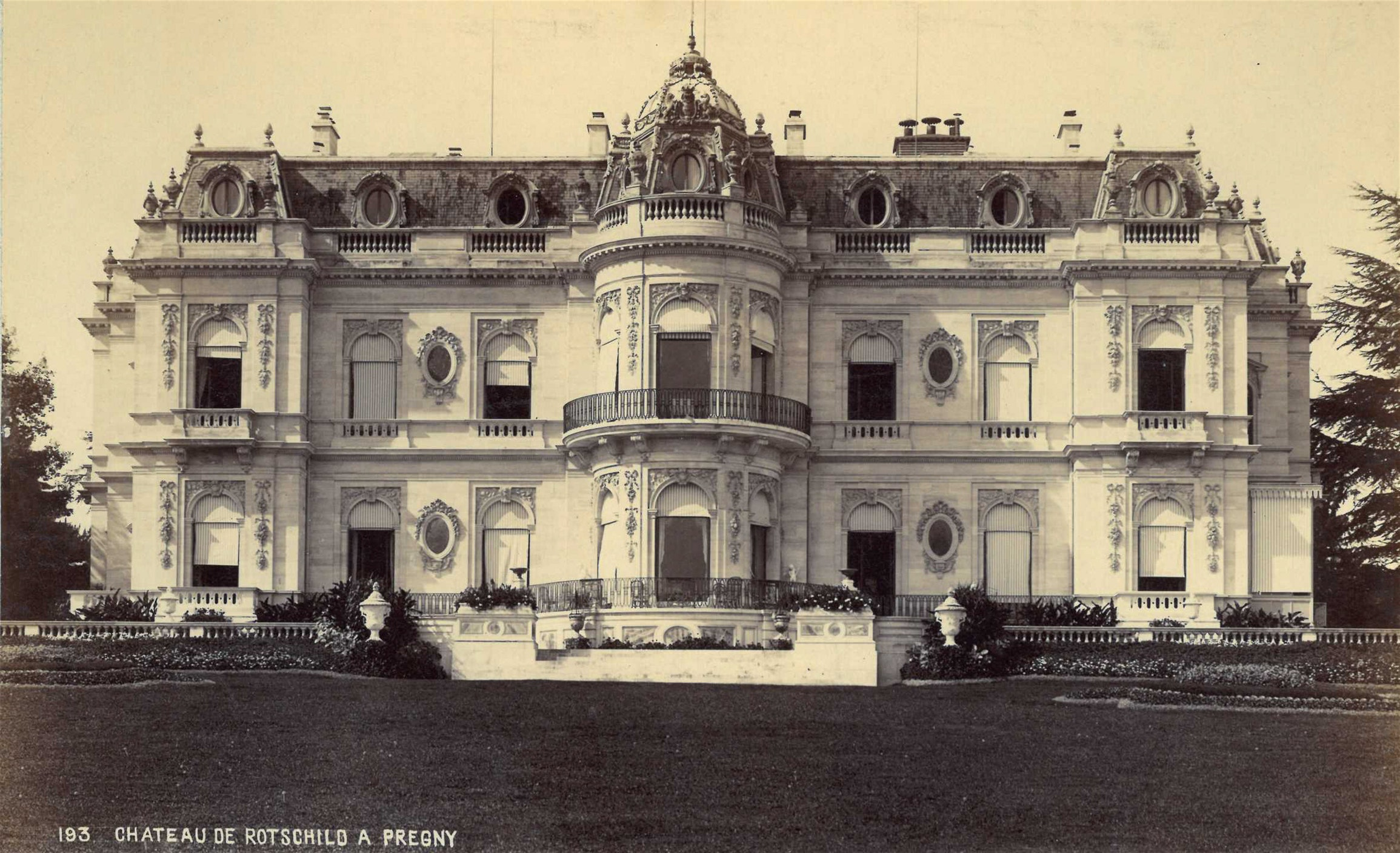
Château de Pregny, Pregny-Chambésy

- Château de Pregny
- Castel Beau Cèdre

=== United Kingdom ===
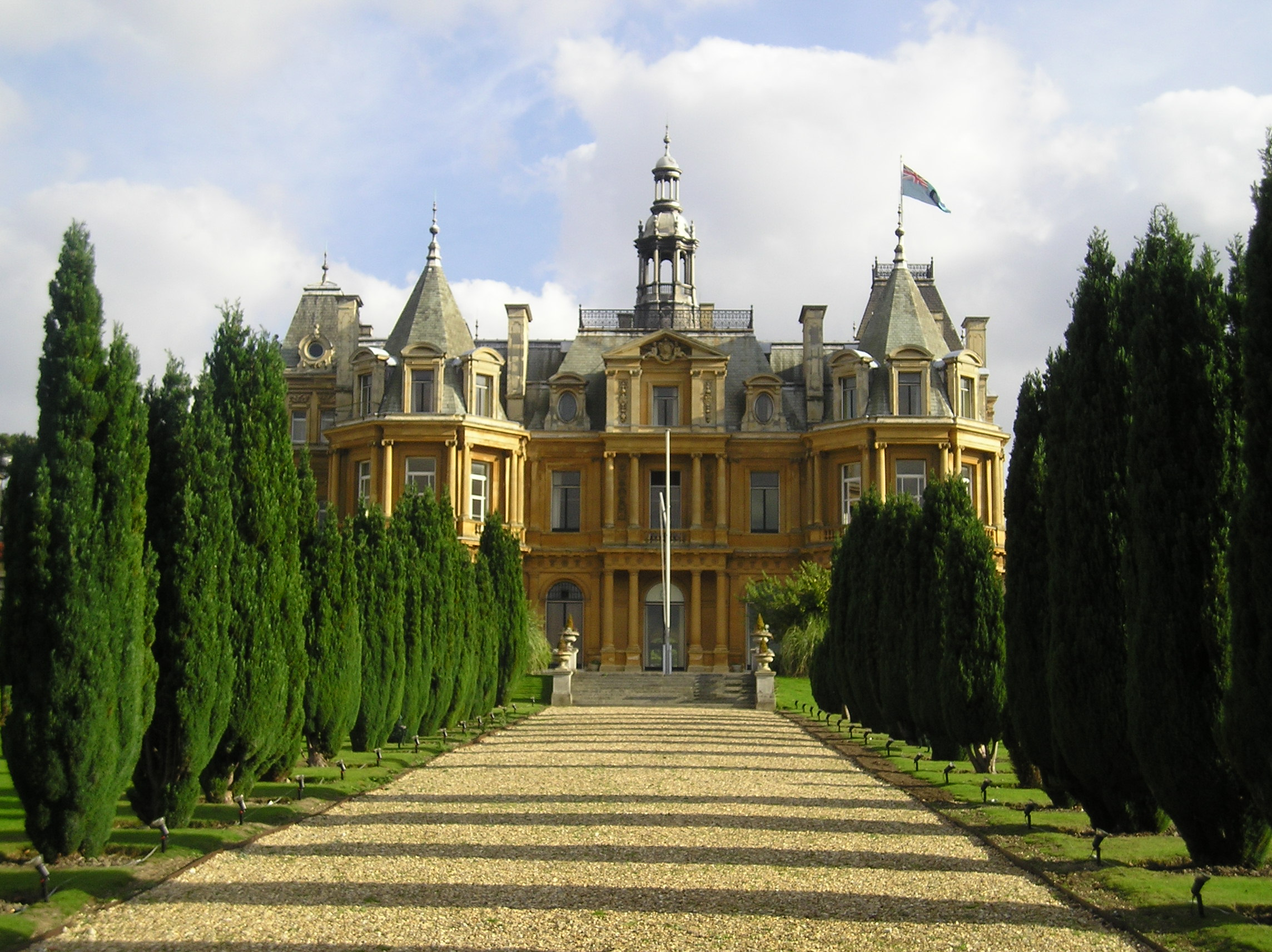
Halton House, Buckinghamshire

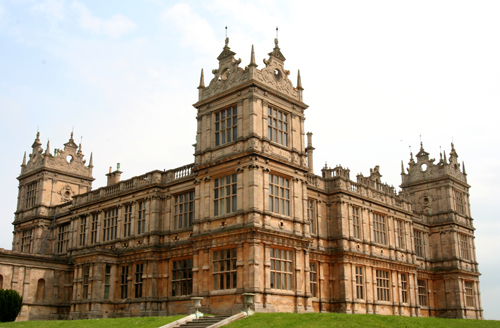
Mentmore Towers, Buckinghamshire

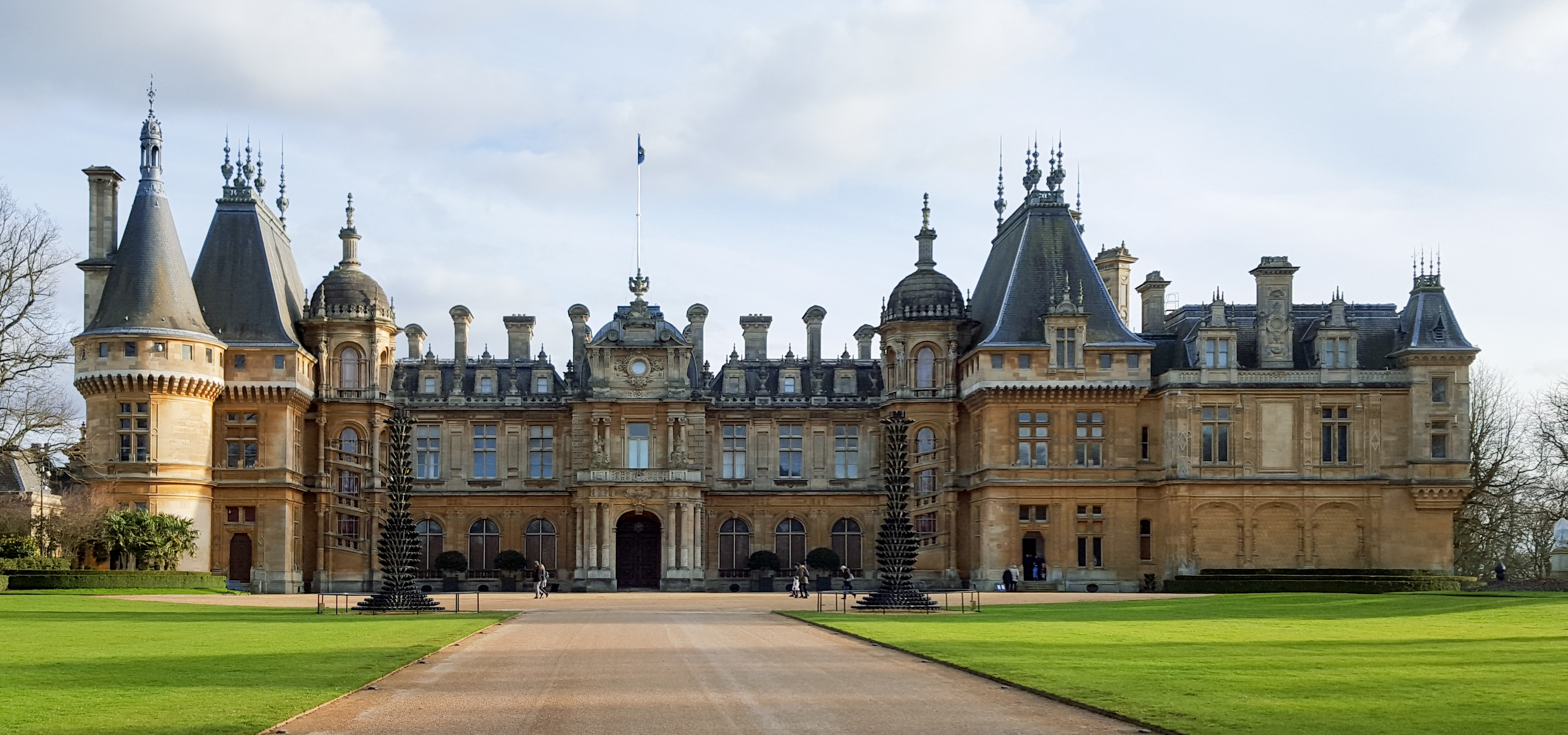
Waddesdon Manor, Buckinghamshire

==== Greater London ====
- 5 Hamilton Place
- Gunnersbury Park
- Kingston House
- New Court
- Spencer House, Westminster

==== East Midlands ====
- Ashton Wold

==== East ====
- Woodwalton Fen
- Champneys
- Pleasaunce
- Palace House
- Rushbrooke Hall
- Tring Park Mansion

==== South East ====
- Ascott House
- Aston Clinton House
- Elsfield Manor
- Exbury Gardens
- Exbury House
- Eythrope
- Flint House, Buckinghamshire
- Halton House
- Hamble Cliff House
- Mentmore Towers
- Princes Risborough Manor House
- Shorncliffe Lodge
- Waddesdon Manor

==== Yorkshire and the Humber ====
- Swinton Grange

== See also ==
- Rothschild family
