= Steinbach Castle (Göstling) =

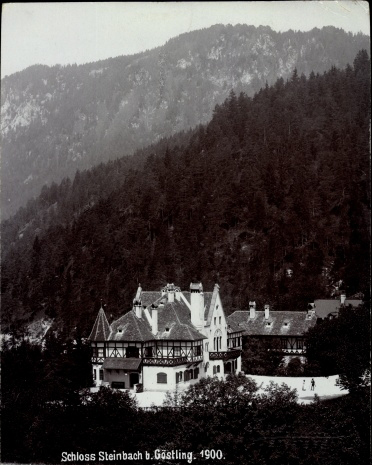
Steinbach Castle, 1900

Steinbach Castle (German: Schloss Steinbach) is a former hunting lodge located in Göstling an der Ybbs, Scheibbs District of Lower Austria.

== History ==
In 1875 Baron Albert Salomon Anselm von Rothschild bought a large estate in the south of Lower Austria, near the Styrian boarder, between Göstling, Lackenhof, and Gaming. Rothschild divided the property into five administrative areas, Waidhofen and der Ybbs, Gaming, Göstling an der Ybbs, Hollenstein and Langau. There, Rothschild established a substantial forestry business and a hunting lodge and Tyrolean style country estate for his family. The building was expanded into an elegant hunting lodge in 1894.

At the end of the nineteenth century, Rothschild had an English cottage-style hunting lodge built in Göstling. Upon his death in 1911, his sons Alphonse Meyer de Rothschild and Louis Nathaniel de Rothschild inherited the estate with Alphonse receiving Langau and Gaming, and Louis receiving Göstling an der Ybbs, Hollenstein and Waidhofen an der Ybbs.

=== World War II ===
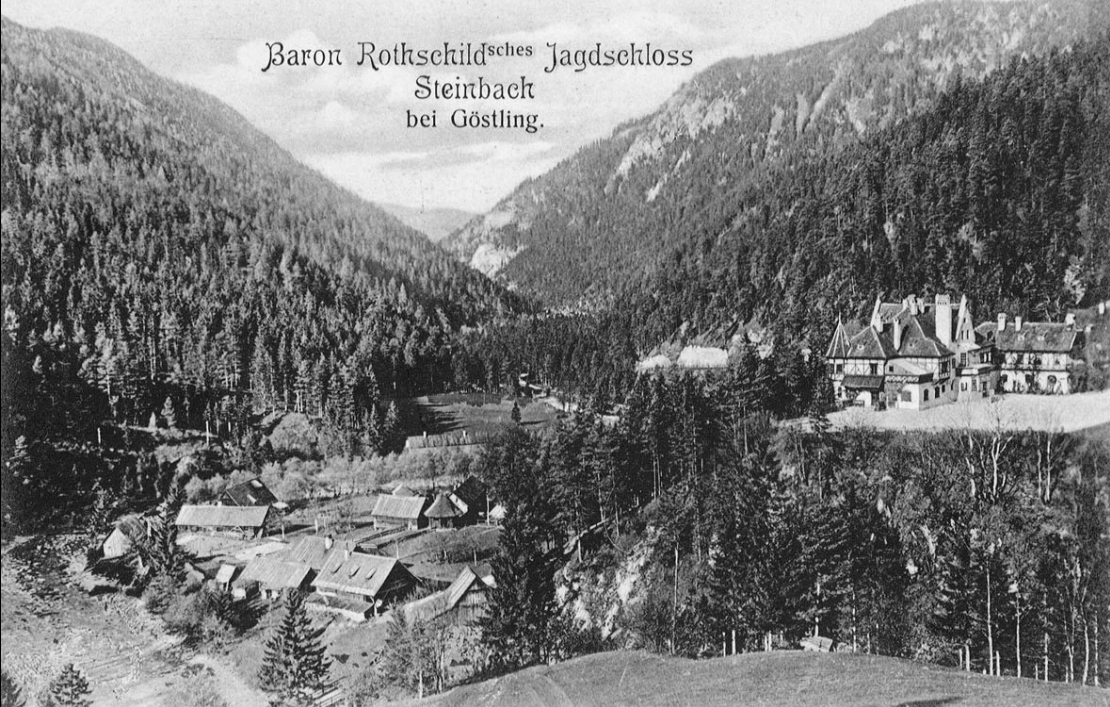
Baron Rothschild's hunting lodge, c. 1905

In April 1938, after the Anschluss where Nazi Germany annexed Austria, all of the Rothschild estates in Lower Austria were expropriated. In 1939, the Ministry of the Interior and Cultural Affairs declared Steinbach to be a secret depot (code name "Jagd") along with Gaming Castle (German: Schloss Gaming) (code name "Schloss"). From 1939, Jagd and Schloss became the most important depot outside Vienna for items from the Kunsthistorisches Museum. They held Egyptian and Near Eastern objects, Ambras portrait, antiquities and coin collections from ancient Greece and Rome, the Imperial Treasury and the Collection of Sculptures, Arts and Crafts. The provisional director of the KHM, Fritz Dworschak, who coordinated the salvage operations from the Viennese state museums, had some of the objects d'art that had been expropriated from David Goldmann, Rudolf Gutmann, Felix Haas, Alphonse and Louis Rothschild, and Alfons Thorsch sent to "Jagd". In July 1942, however, the Nazis decided to abandon the building as depot and the objects were removed in September 1942. The building was then transferred to the Reich Forestry department (German: Reichsforste).

=== Post War ===
After the war, Louis de Rothschild claimed restitution of the expropriated properties in 1946 and in 1948. Rothschild, who by then was living in New York City, gave his properties to the Austrian state, on condition that it used the proceeds to fund pensions for his former employees. Therefore, the Steinbach Castle was taken over by the Austrian Federal Forestry department in 1949. The former Rothschild hunting lodge itself was purchased by Kurt Smolka, owner of the interior design company INKU, in 1962.

== See also ==
- Rothschild family residences
