= Goût Rothschild =

Style of interior decorating

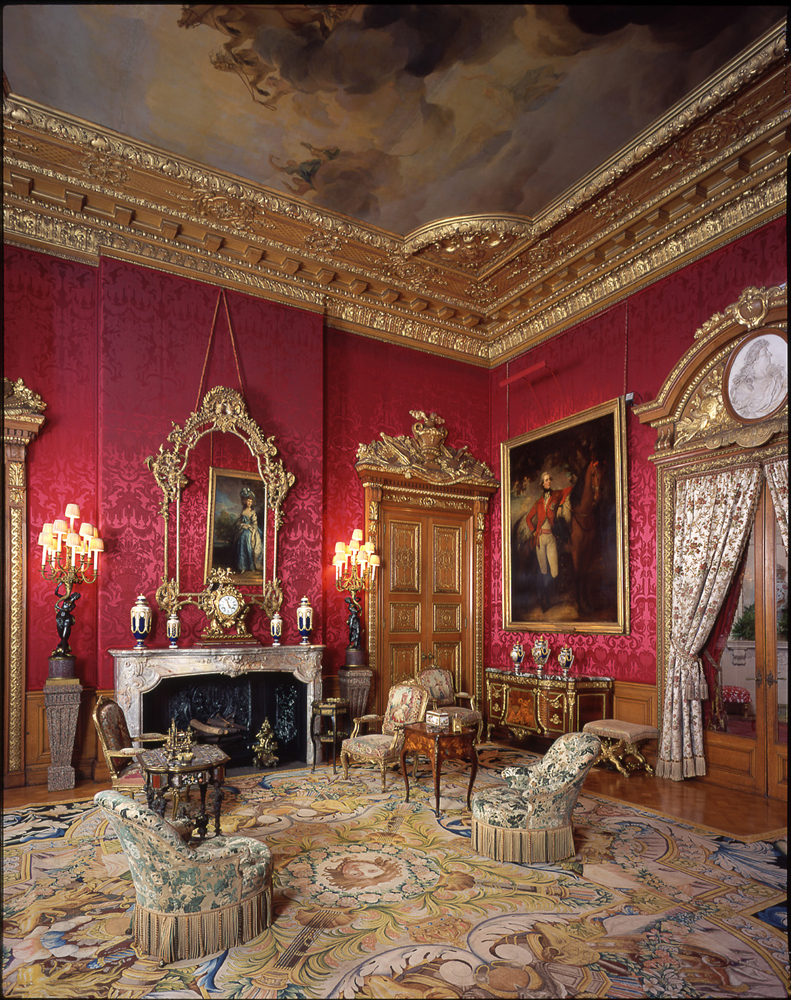
The Red Drawing Room at Waddesdon Manor.

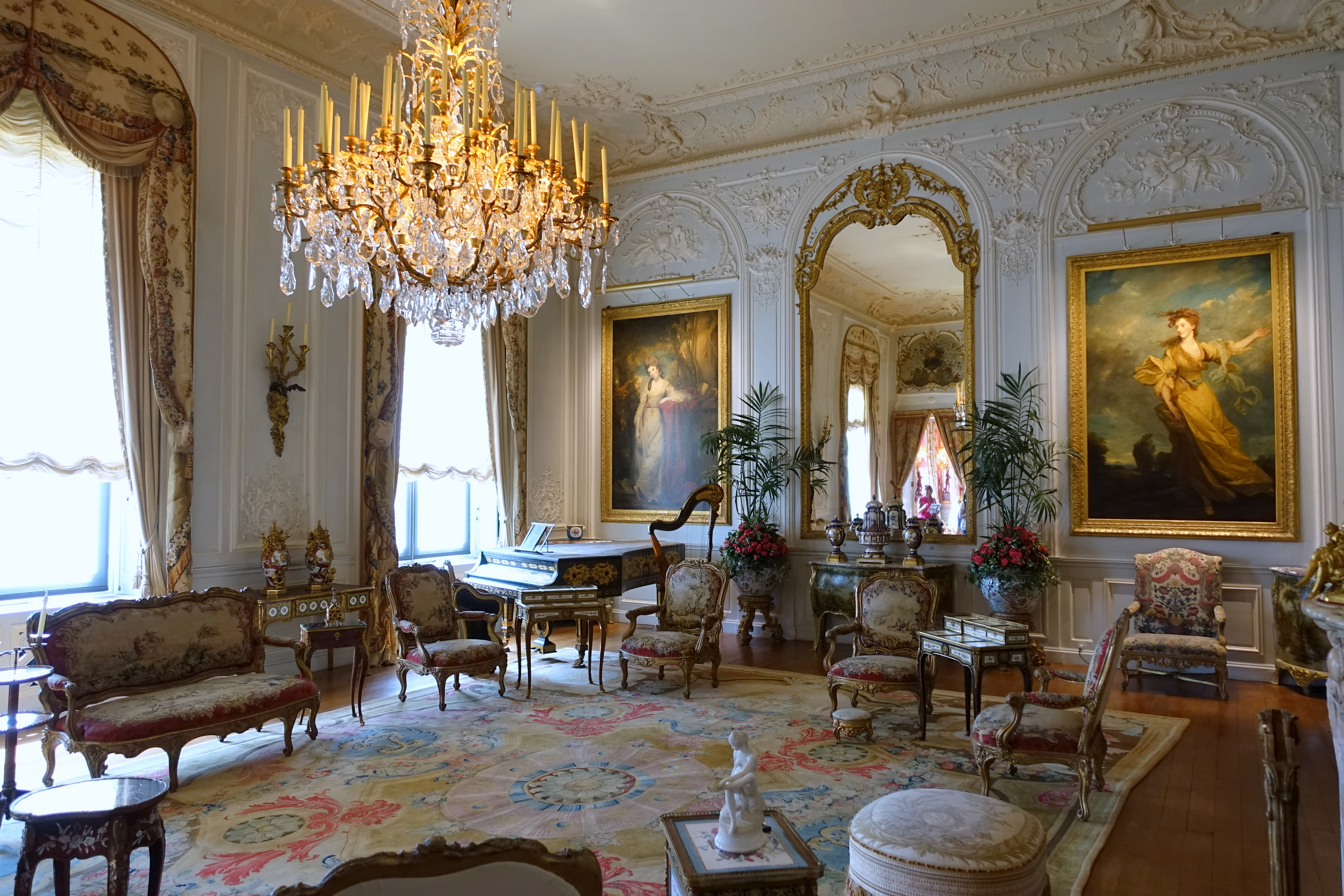
The Grey Drawing Room at Waddesdon Manor.

Le goût Rothschild (pronounced [lə ɡu ʁɔt.ʃild]; French for 'the Rothschild taste') describes a detailed, elaborate style of interior decoration and living which had its origin in France, Britain, Austria, and Germany during the nineteenth century, when the rich, famous, and powerful Rothschild family was at its height. The Rothschild aesthetic and life-style later influenced other rich and powerful families, including the Astors, Vanderbilts and Rockefellers, and became hallmarks of the American Gilded Age. Aspects of le goût Rothschild continued into the twentieth century, affecting such designers as Yves Saint Laurent and Robert Denning.

== Characteristics ==
The decorative interior elements of the "Goût Rothschild" include lavish use of extravagant heavy textile fabrics (like damask, brocade, and velvet) and much gilding, elaborate stucco ceilings, and precious (and often antique) wooden panelling and parquet flooring. This heavy abundance is combined with eighteenth-century, mostly French, furniture. For the Rothschilds, furniture and works of art often were of royal provenance. The family bought only the best which was on the market at that time, with preference for the reigns of Louis XIV, Louis XV, and Louis XVI. Following the French Revolution in 1789, there were some excellent pieces to buy, including many from the Château de Versailles. In architecture, the Rothschilds preferred styles of the Renaissance. The fusion of these uses of materials and styles, "the Rothschild style", combines a sense of Victorian horror vacui beside masterworks of art, sculpture, and armour.

With the construction of Waddesdon Manor, the newly established English branch of the Rothschild family revived imitation of French Renaissance styles in the United Kingdom. The expansive manor house was built in the tradition of the châteaux in the Loire Valley. The Rothschilds often bought original architectural elements from neglected castles and palaces and re-used these floors, fireplaces, ceilings, doors, and panellings in their own newly built castles and palaces, as, for example, in Mentmore Towers, Waddesdon Manor, the Château de Ferrières, and the Villa Ephrussi de Rothschild at Saint-Jean-Cap-Ferrat.

Yves Saint Laurent and his partner Pierre Bergé were much impressed by the interiors of the Château de Ferrières. They held the decoration of the "Blue Saloon" as a model for the decoration of their own home.

== The preferred style ==
Mark Girouard discusses the development around the opulence of the Rothschild style: "the Rothschilds moved into the market for what were known at the time as 'curiosities' rather than 'antiques' in the 1840s... In the 1870s they came to dominate that market in Europe through their number and their enthusiasm, their increasing knowledge, [and] their apparently limitless resources".

== Maison Jansen ==
The Paris-based interior decoration company Maison Jansen was one of the leading companies whose designs came close to the "Goût Rothschild", though in a less opulent way. Among their clients were the administration of John F. Kennedy who engaged them to redesign the White House and the Duke and the Duchess of Windsor whose mansion in Paris they decorated.

== Gallery ==
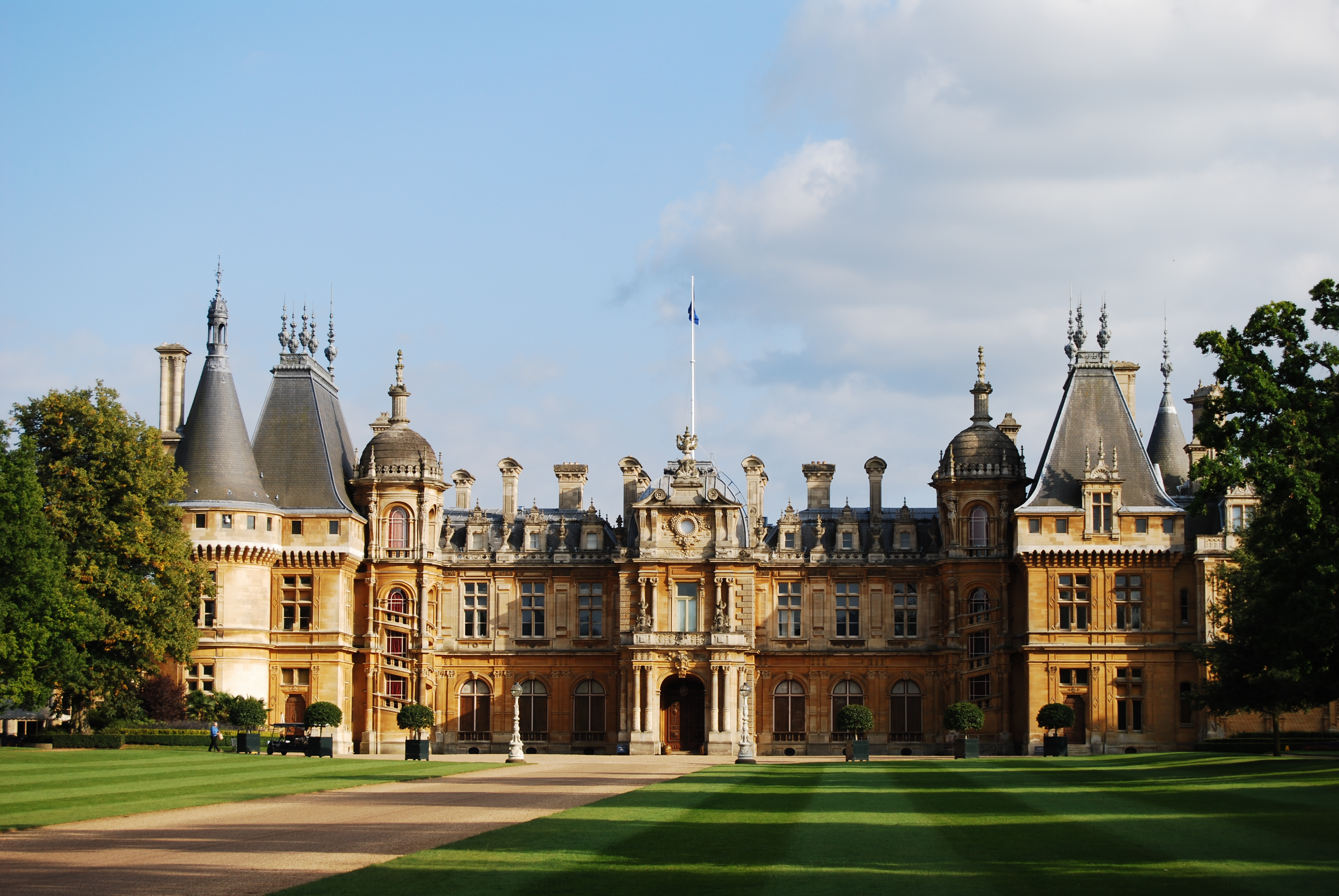
Waddesdon Manor in England

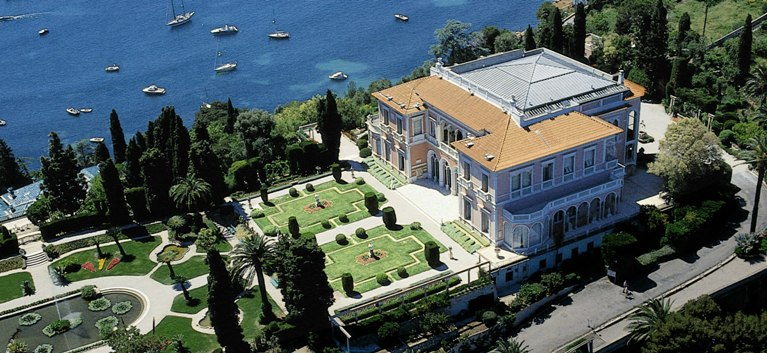
Villa Ephrussi de Rothschild in France

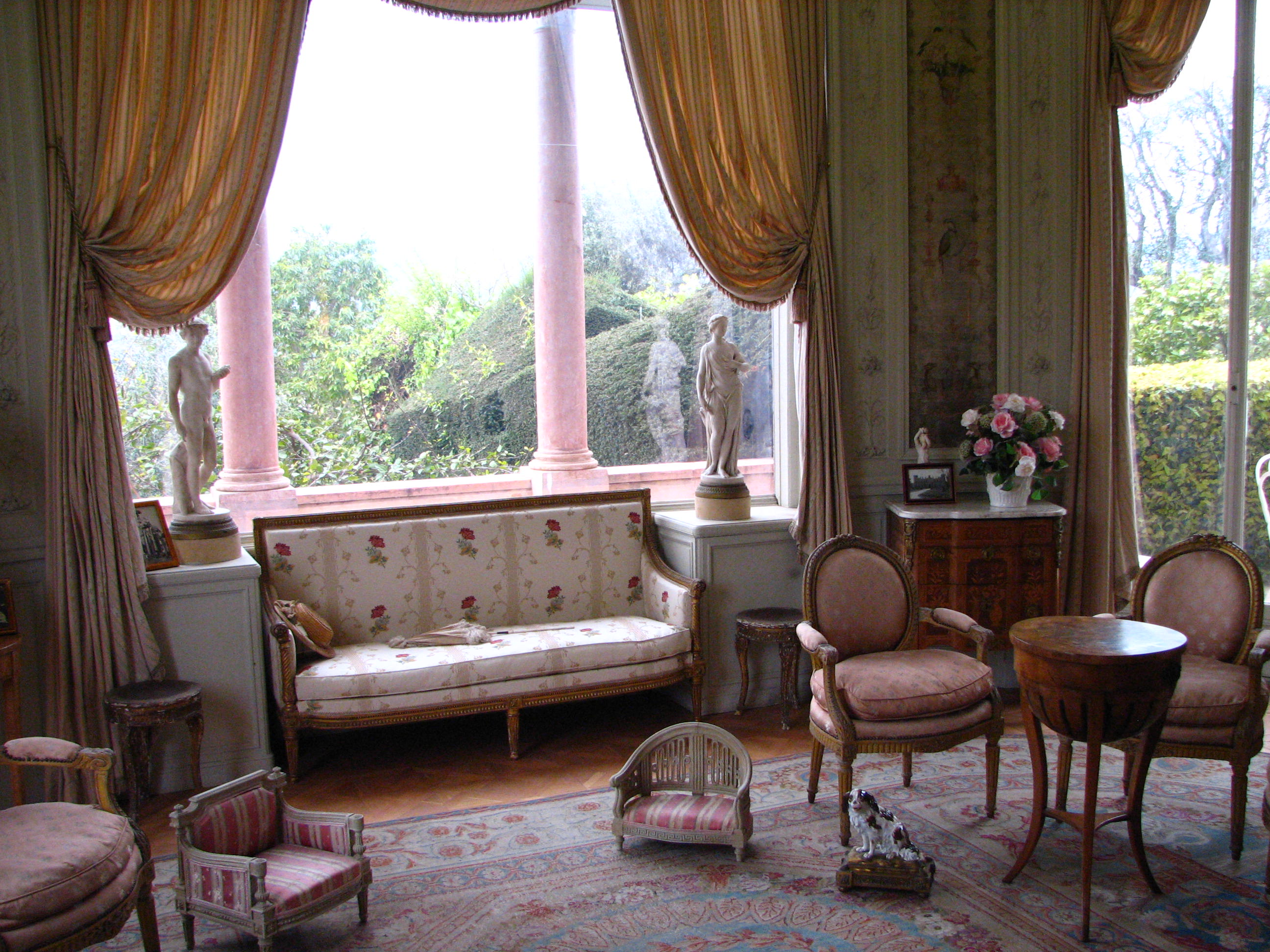
Drawing room at Villa Ephrussi de Rothschild

== See also ==
- Rothschild family residences
