= Villa Rothschild =

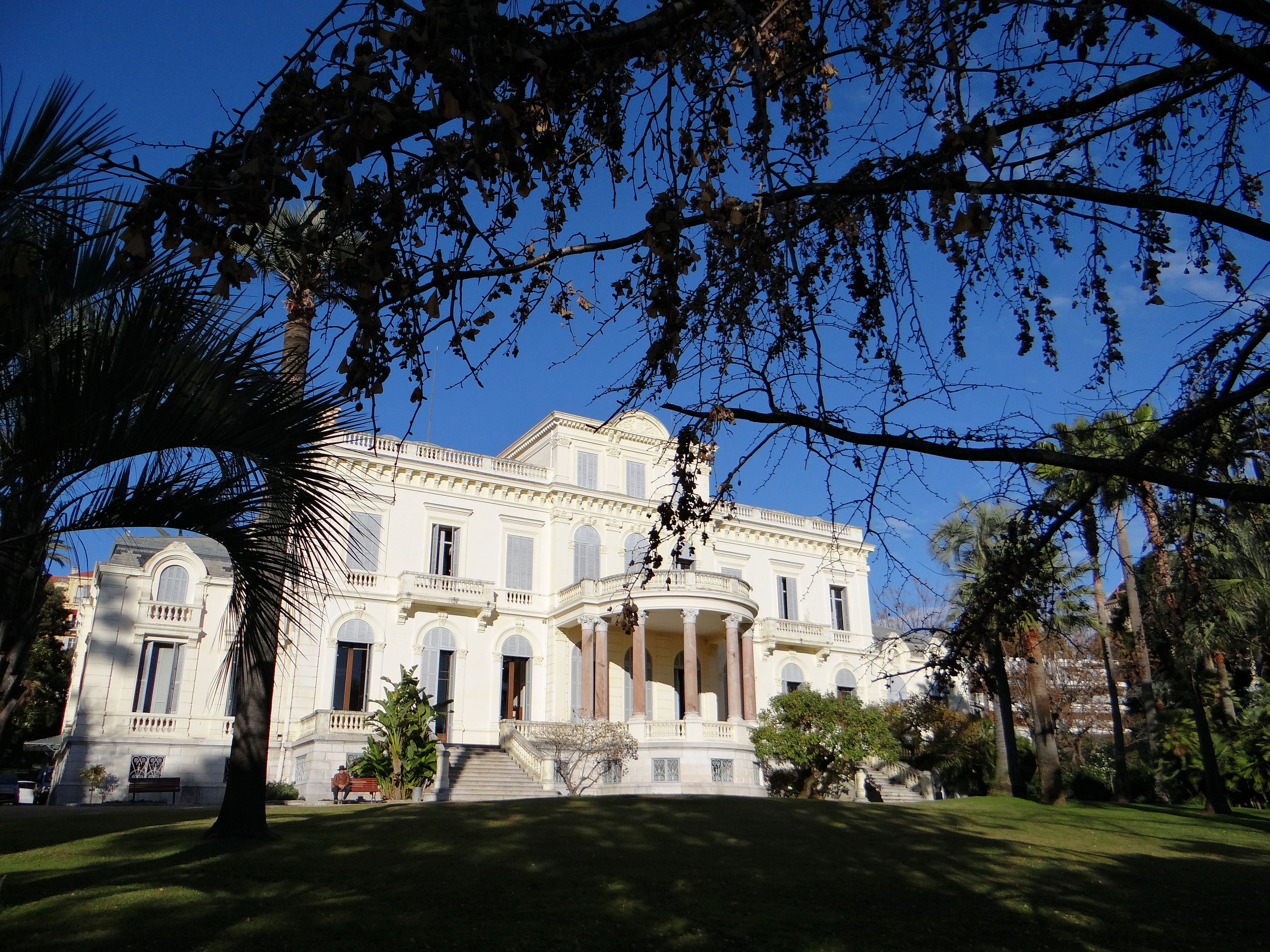
- The Villa Rothschild in 2013
- Interactive map of the Villa Rothschild area

General information
- Type: House
- Location: 7 avenue Jean-de-Noailles, Cannes, France
- Coordinates: 43.5516°N 7.0025°E
- Completed: 1881

The Villa Rothschild is a historic mansion in Cannes. It was built in 1881 for Betty de Rothschild (1805-1886), James Mayer de Rothschild's widow. It has been listed as an official historical monument since 1991. It was turned into a media library and carries the commercial name "médiathèque Noailles".

== History ==
The land (where the Villa Marie-Thèrese was standing) was acquired by Betty de Rothschild in 1881, and marked the first time a Rothschild planned the construction of an estate in Southwestern France. The local architect Charles Baron was commissioned to build the villa in 1882. The park was modelled on the Château de Ferrières' park.

Betty de Rothschild lived in the villa until her death (1886). It then belonged to her oldest son Alphonse James de Rothschild (1827–1905), and then to his son Édouard Alphonse James de Rothschild (1868-1949).

The villa was sold to the city of Cannes in 1952.

== Description ==
This neo-classical 5-story villa has 40 rooms and 28 bedrooms. The back entrance's wood-sculpted wall boards are from the Hôtel Talleyrand in Paris.
