= Jules Lemaire =

French physician and pharmacist (1814–1873)

Jules Lemaire (February 17, 1814, in Ferrières (Seine-et-Marne) – March 8, 1873, in Les Lilas [Seine-Saint-Denis]), was a French medical doctor and pharmacist. He was the first to discover the antiseptic properties of carbolic acid (phenol).

== Biography ==
Lemaire, pharmacist and chemist, had been instructed by Dr. Ferdinand Le Beuf, pharmacist in Bayonne, to experiment with a preparation of coal tar, emulsified using an alcoholic tincture of saponin. Lemaire recognized antiseptic properties in this preparation, due to the carbolic acid (phenol) from coal tar, and published the results of this research in 1860 in a book entitled Du coaltar saponiné, désinfectant énergique (Saponinated coal tar, an energetic disinfectant).

Lemaire then experimented with the effects of phenol alongside those of coal tar, and presented the results of all his work in a new book published in 1863: De l'acide phénique, de son action sur les végétaux, les animaux, les ferments, les venins, les virus, les miasmes et de ses applications à l'industrie, à l'hygiène, aux sciences anatomiques et à la thérapeutique. He gave his preference here to phenol, more energetic and easier to handle than coal tar, and recommended phenol in aqueous solution at 5%. The work was out of print in a few months and had to be republished in 1865.

A long controversy, which began in 1865, pitted him against Doctor Gilbert Déclat (1827–1896) on the primacy of this finding. The scientific publications of Lemaire on this subject were well before those of Déclat; the primacy of discovery therefore belonged to Lemaire.

== Scope of the discovery ==
The antiseptic properties of phenol discovered by Jules Lemaire were put to good use by the British surgeon Joseph Lister (1827–1912), pioneer of the antiseptic method in operative surgery, who had the idea of putting all his surgical tools and gowns in carbolic acid, as well as the wounds of the operated, thus reducing the postoperative mortality rate from 40% to 15%. He published his results in six articles in The Lancet in 1867. On September 21, 1867, in the Edinburgh Daily Review, James Young Simpson (using a pseudonym) expressed the idea that Lister's last article was misleading, as it "attribute[d] the first surgical employment of carbolic acid to Professor Lister". Simpson then mentioned Lemaire's work.

== Awards and honours ==
- Member of the Société des Sciences médicales (Society of Medical Sciences).
- Member of the Société médico-chirurgicale (Medico-Surgical Society).
- Member of the Société d’Émulation pour la science pharmaceutique de Paris (Emulation Society for Pharmaceutical Science in Paris).
- Knight of the Order of Isabella the Catholic.
