= Bert Ehgartner =

Austrian film director and journalist

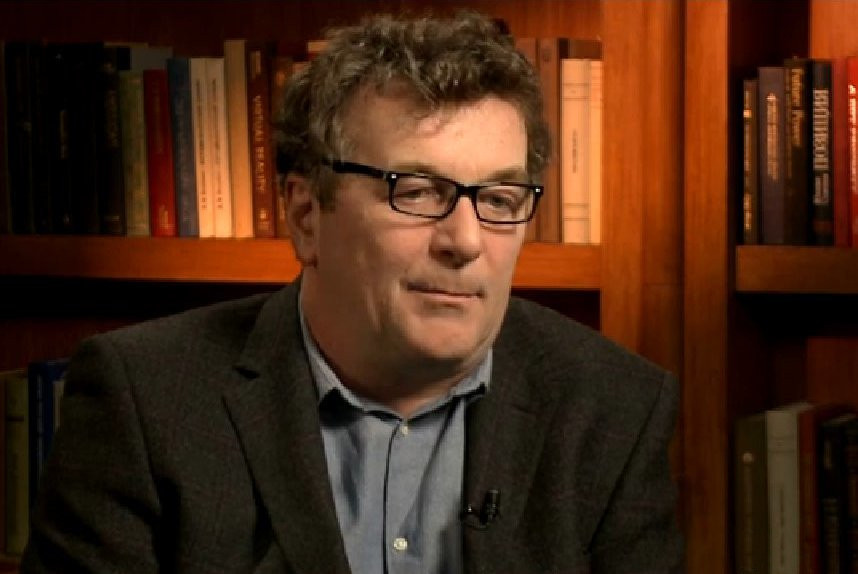

Bert Ehgartner (born 7 October 1962 in Waidhofen an der Ybbs, Lower Austria, Austria) is an Austrian author, journalist, screenwriter, executive producer and director.

== Early life ==
Ehgartner studied journalism, political science and computer science in Vienna, and completed courses in evidence-based medicine. Since 1987 Ehgartner has worked as a freelance journalist, writing for the weekly news magazine profil, Der Standard, an Austrian daily newspaper, and for Süddeutsche Zeitung, the largest German daily newspaper. From 1990 to 1996, he was editor in charge of the Austrian weekly magazine Die Ganze Woche, and from 2000 to 2005 he was editor in charge of the health website surfmed.de.

He also wrote several books on health and science topics.

Ehgartner wrote Dirty Little Secret – The Aluminum Files (available only in German and Polish) and directed a 90-minute documentary film, The Age of Aluminium, where he explains the science behind the threat that he infers from certain aluminium compounds (e.g. aluminium sulfate by referencing the Camelford water pollution incident).

== Awards and nominations ==
- 2000: Medikinale-International Munich, Germany: First prize "summa cum laude" for the documentary film Ticks – The Real Vampires (2000)
- 2001: Grand prix at the 39th TECHFILM – International Festival of Films on Science, Technology and Art, Prague, Czech Republic for the documentary film Ticks – The Real Vampires (2000)

== Bibliography ==
- Dirty little secret – The Age of Aluminium (2012)
- Gesund bis der Arzt kommt: Ein Handbuch zur Selbstverteidigung (Healthy until the doctor comes: A book for self-defence) (2010)
- Lob der Krankheit: Warum es gesund ist, ab und zu krank zu sein (Praise the disease: why it is healthy to get sick from time to time) (2008)
- Die Lebensformel: Sieben Voraussetzungen für ein glückliches langes Leben (The life formula - Seven secrets to living a long and happy life) (2004)
- With Kurt Langbein: Das Medizin-Kartell: Die sieben Todsünden der Gesundheitsindustrie (The health care cartel – The Seven Deadly Sins of the medical industry) (2002)
- With Kurt Langbein, Christian Skalnik, Inge Smolek, Michaela Streimelweger, Doris Tschabitscher: Bioterror: Die gefährlichsten Waffen der Welt. Wer sie besitzt – was sie bewirken – wie man sich schützen kann (Bioterrorism – The most dangerous weapons of warfare in the world. Who possesses them - what they can do - how to protect yourself) (2002)

== Filmography ==
- The Age of Aluminium (director), ZDF / ARTE, ORF und SRF, Menschen & Mächte, (2012)
- Essen ohne Tiere (Eating without animals) (director), ORF, Kreuz & Quer, (2011)
- Kampf gegen Korruption und Verschwendung – 250 Jahre Rechnungshof (Fight against corruption - 250 years Austrian Court of Audit) (director), ORF, Menschen und Mächte, (2011)
- Patient Gesundheitswesen (Patient healthcare system) (director), ORF, Report Spezial, (2008)
- Das ganz normale Verhalten der Österreicher (The common habits of Austrians) (director), ORF, various episodes (2003-2006)
- Feng Shui im Alltagstest (Feng Shui – in the everyday life) (director), ORF (2003)
- Bioterror (director), RTL (2001)
- Ticks – The Real Vampires (director), WDR / ARTE, ORF, Discovery Channel (2000)
- Die Haut – Spiegel der Seele (The Skin – Mirror of the Soul) (director), ORF, RTL (1999)
- Allergien – Wenn die Umwelt zum Feind wird (Allergies – If nature becomes your enemy) (director), ORF (1999)
- Der Krieg im Körper ('War within the body')(director), RTL (1998)
- Bergmenschen (Hillmen) (director), ORF (1998)
