= Château de Suresnes =

French château

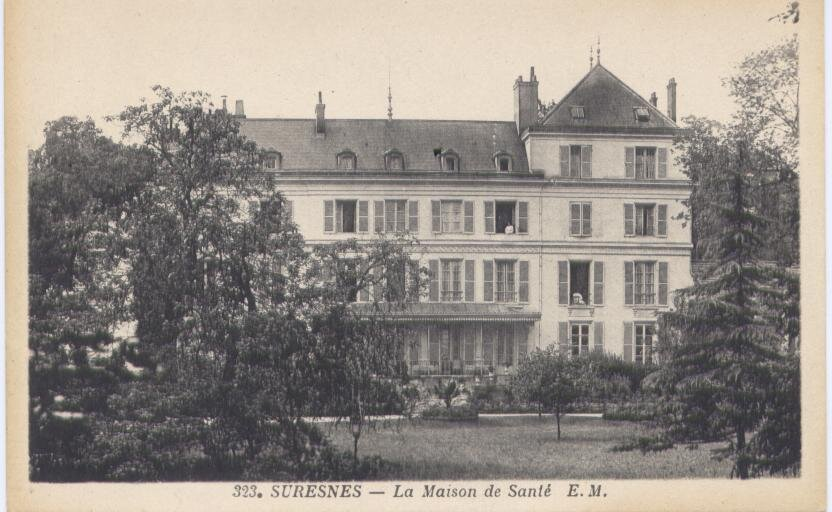
Postcard of the Château de Suresnes, between 1900 and 1920

The Château de Suresnes was a French château in Suresnes, a commune in the western inner suburbs of Paris, France. Located in Hauts-de-Seine, 9.3 km (5.8 mi) from the centre of Paris.

== History ==
In 1826 Salomon von Rothschild (the founder of the Austrian branch of the Rothschild family) purchased the Suresnes château and estate along the banks of the Seine (across from his daughter, Betty's Château de Boulogne, today known as Château Rothschild). Sold as state property during the Revolution, it had been acquired by the Count de Lagarde who built a château there in the 19th century. On the estate, Rothschild built a farm and cultivated crops. Between 1832 and 1841, Swiss architect Joseph-Antoine Froelicher (the official architect to the duchess of Berry) built a number of conservatories which Rothschild used to grow exotic plants and fruits. Salomon was a shareholder of the de Rothschild Frères bank when it was opened in Paris by his brother James Mayer de Rothschild (considered founder of the French branch of the family).

During the French Revolution of 1848, the estate was plundered, "led by the local poultry butcher, smashing furniture and gilt mirrors while slashing paintings and stealing what they could carry, before then burning it to the ground." The royal Château de Neuilly was also sacked at the same time. Upon Salomon's death in Paris in 1855, the estate was inherited by his brother James, who reportedly considered restoring it, but instead, had the house was taken down and the land sold off in 94 parcels. James' son, Salomon James de Rothschild, retained land in Île de Puteaux nearby, and built a model farm.

== Gallery ==
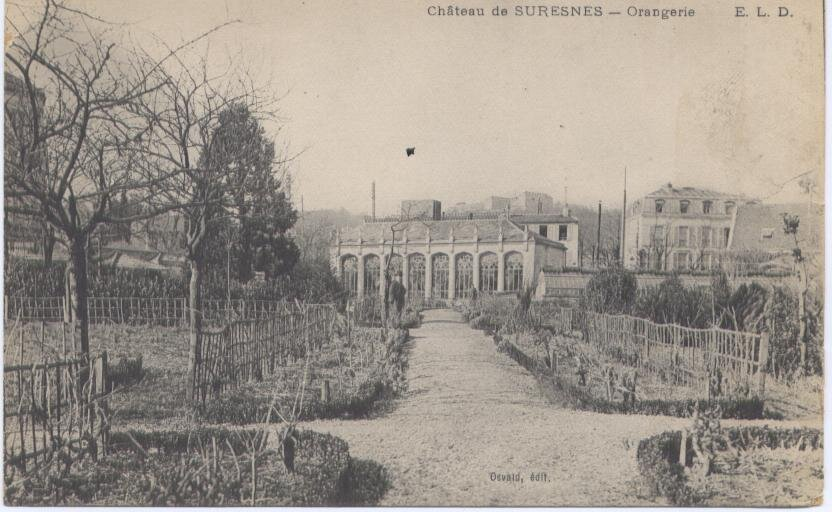
Postcard of the orangery at Suresnes, between 1900 and 1910

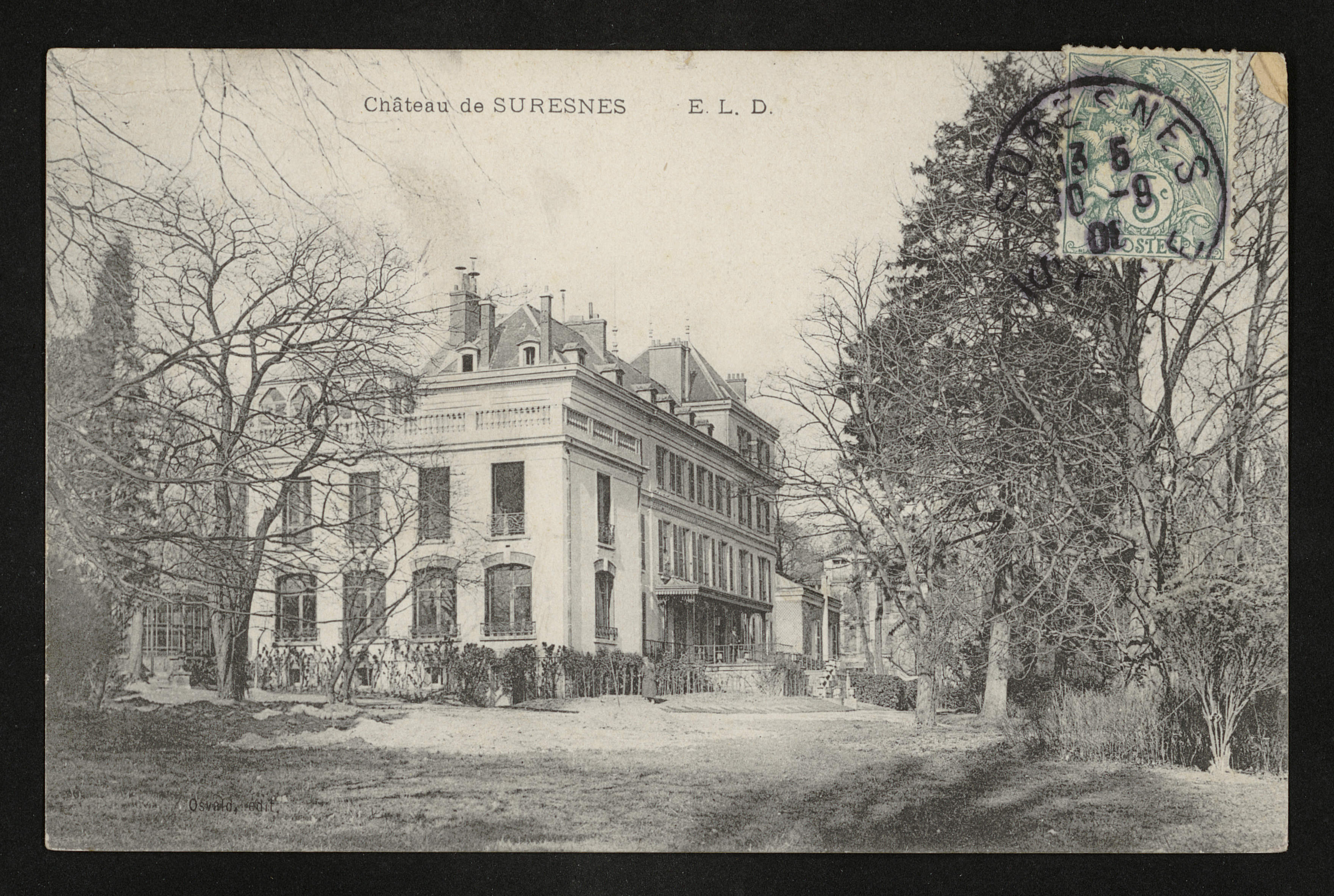
Postcard of the Château de Suresnes, 1910

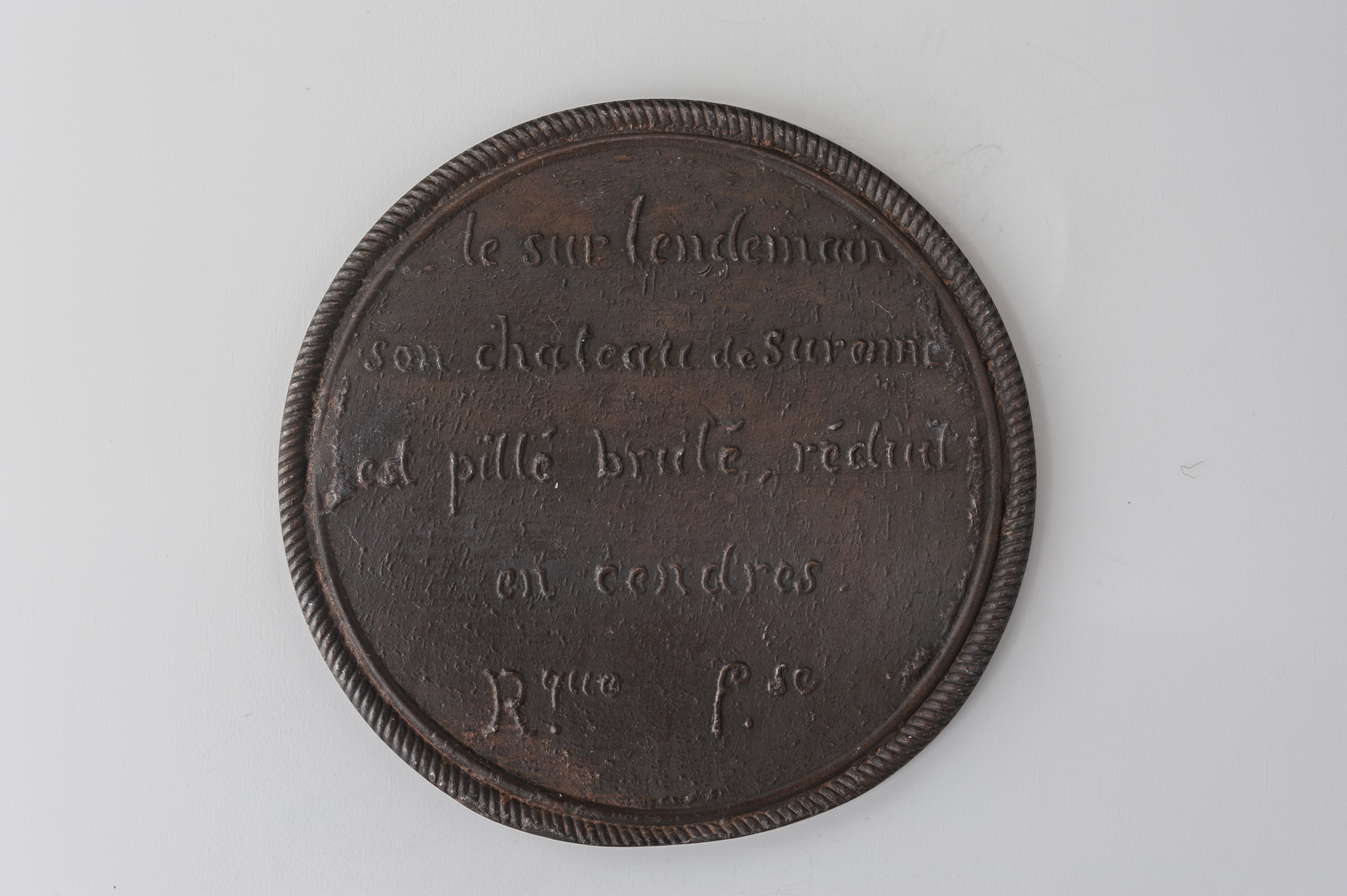
Medal engraved from 1848

== See also ==
- Rothschild family residences
