= Rothschild Castle (Waidhofen) =

Castle in Lower Austria, Austria

Coordinates: 47.9630°N 14.7737°E

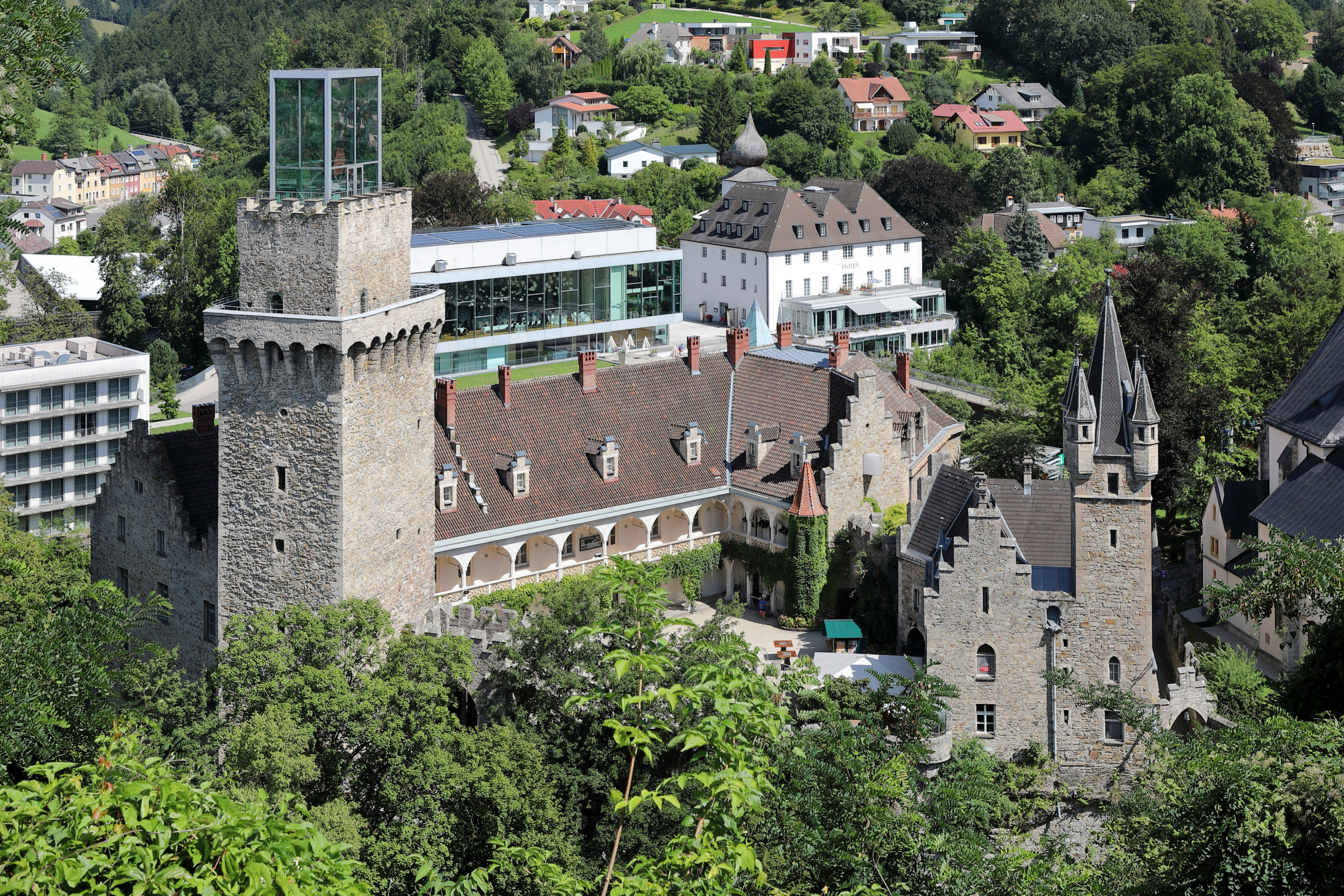
West view of Rothschild Castle

Rothschild Castle (German: Schloss Rothschild), also known as Waidhofen Castle (German: Schloss Waidhofen), is a historic castle located in the town of Waidhofen an der Ybbs in southwestern Lower Austria. Originally a medieval castle from the first half of the 13th century, it was the seat of the Freising governors for centuries. Albert Salomon Anselm von Rothschild expanded it in 1875 to become the seat of his extensive estates. Rothschild utilized Friedrich von Schmidt for the neo-Gothic reconstruction.

Today, it is owned by the city and underwent a major renovation in 2007, during which the architect Hans Hollein added new architectural accents. In 2007, it was the venue for the Lower Austrian State Exhibition alongside Sankt Peter in der Au Castle. Today, it houses the "5e Museum", dedicated to the history of the city, as well as various other institutions in the city of Waidhofen.

== History ==
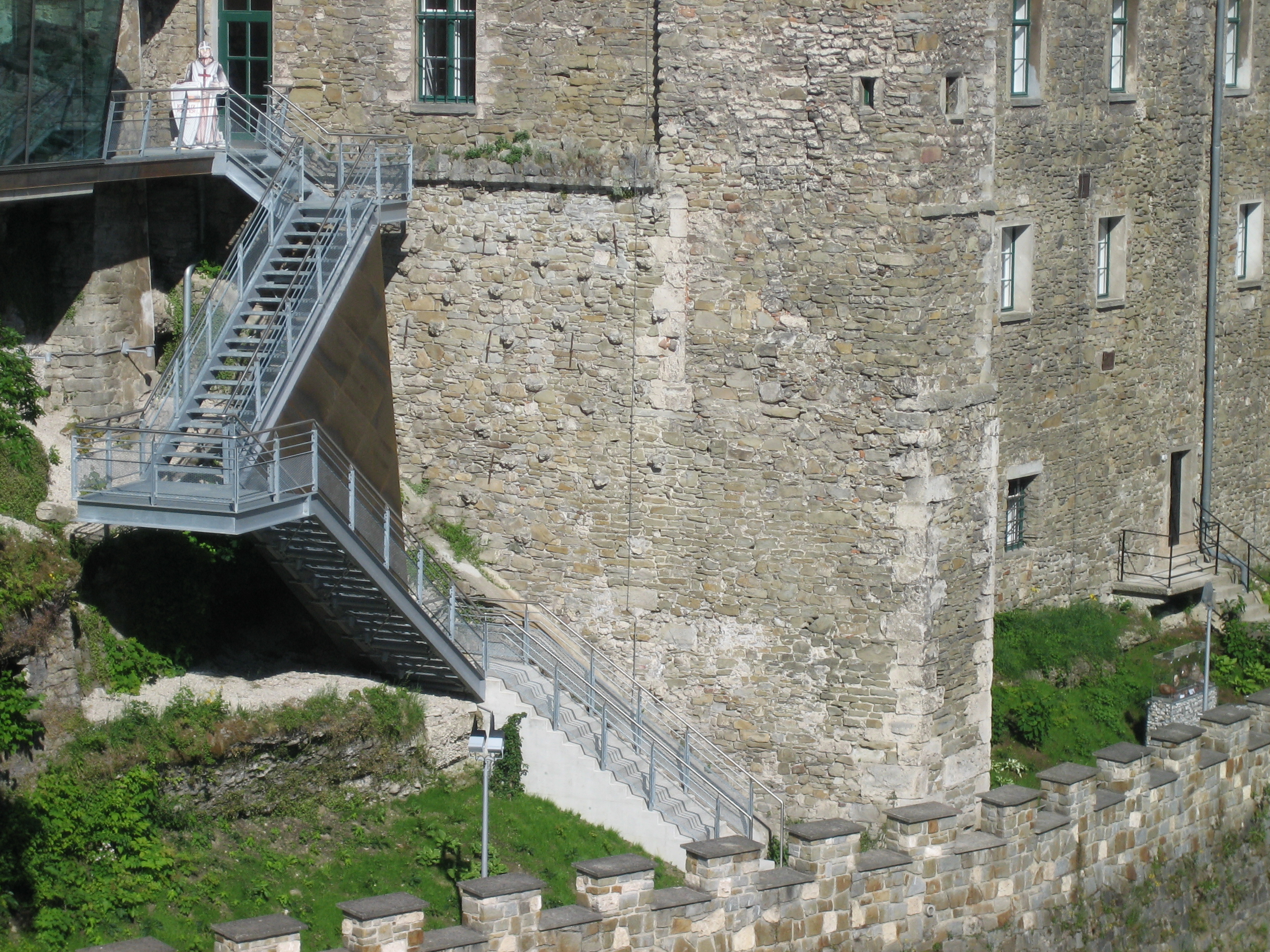
The oldest preserved part of the building is this wall in the basement of the stately residential building

Waidhofen Castle, and the associated market town, were founded by the Counts of Peilstein. As bailiffs, they were vassals of the Bishops of Freising, but also owned considerable land in other parts of what is now Lower Austria and pursued a conscious policy of increasing their economic and political power. From 1190 to 1218, a complex legal dispute spanning several generations broke out between bailiffs and bishops over ownership of Konradsheim Castle, which no longer exists but was important at the time. The oldest parts of Waidhofen Castle date from the first half of the 13th century. The dispute was only ended when the successors of the Counts of Peilstein died out and the property finally fell to Freising, where it was decided not to entrust it to any more bailiffs in the future.

Waidhofen Castle reached increasing importance in the second half of the 13th century, likely due to the steadily growing population as can be seen in the frequent visits of the Freising bishops. According to the Freising Bishop Chronicle, Bishop Berthold von Wehingen was the builder of the keep and enlarger of the castle. He was able to significantly increase the Freising possessions in Lower Austria through his simultaneous activity as chancellor of the Austrian dukes.

The great city fire of 1515 destroyed not only the castle but also the church and the entire upper town. On Holy Saturday 1571, the bishop's fisherman started a fire by shooting at jackdaws, which also reduced the castle and large parts of the city to rubble and ashes. During this time, extensive renovations and some changes were made to the castle buildings. From the 15th century onwards, Waidhofen Castle was referred to as the "castle".

=== Downfall ===
Due to debts of the Freising Cathedral chapter, it was decided in 1796 to lease the Waidhofen domain to Count Johann Josef von Stielbar. This proved to be a failure, however, and was reversed just two years later. The Waidhofen domain was then administered from the Ulmerfeld domain, also in Freising. In 1802, the Bishopric of Freising was secularized by the Bavarian state, which also ended the Freising rule in Waidhofen (which was confirmed in 1803 by the Reichsdeputationshauptschluss, which abolished all ecclesiastical principalities of the Holy Roman Empire of the German Empire). It was not until 1806 that it was finally regulated that all parts of the ecclesiastical properties located in Austria would go to the Austrian state. This turbulence was not noticed much in the castle itself: the last Freising caretaker conveniently became the first Austrian administrator.

In 1822 the castle was in such a bad condition that the lord's office had to be moved to the city. It is assumed that the apse of the castle chapel collapsed around this time, rendering large parts of the wall of the main building facing the Ybbs unstable. From 1840 onwards the most urgent damage was repaired and the lord's office returned. The bridge over the Schwarzbach was built of stone for the first time and the buildings on the Schwarzbach side that were in danger of collapsing were completely rebuilt. In 1848 the moat between the church and the castle was filled in. From 1850 onwards the district collegiate court and the tax office also moved in for a few years.

But by 1864, the building was no longer of any real use. It was mortgaged to the state bank along with the estate and sold to private investors in the same year. In the following years, up to 1875, the owners changed four times: 1864: Hermann Mayer Löwy von Fürth in Bavaria, 1865: Götz Brothers Timber Merchants' Company in Strasbourg, 1869: Joint Stock Company for Forest Industry in Vienna.

A permanent change to the exterior of the castle occurred in 1868, when it was decided not to repair the pyramid-shaped roof of the keep, which had collapsed a year earlier. Instead, in order to improve the appearance of the tower, the top platform, which was now visible for the first time, was raised by around 3 meters and fitted with battlements.

=== Rothschild era ===
In 1875, the powerful Austrian banker Albert Salomon Anselm Freiherr von Rothschild (1844–1911) bought the Waidhofen Castle together with the former estates of Waidhofen an der Ybbs, Gaming and Enzersfeld for 2.9 million guilders. He thus became the largest landowner (31,000 ha) in Lower Austria. He intended to set up the estate administration of his domains in the Ybbstal in the castle.

The neo-Gothic reconstruction began in 1881, was stopped briefly, resumed in 1885 and completed in 1890. From 1887, the builder of the Vienna City Hall and Viennese cathedral master builder Friedrich von Schmidt (1825–1891) worked on the reconstruction. He designed the Court Arcades and the Stöckel Building, which were Rothschild's main interest. Since the population had long been allowed to use the palace as a passageway, Baron Rothschild had an additional bridge built over the Schwarzbach at his own expense as an extension of the moat between the palace and the church, which had already been filled in for several decades.

The interior of the castle was furnished with high-quality, historicist and romantic interior design in keeping with its status. The representative rooms were located in the basement and the private area on the upper floor. In addition, there was also space for household management, storage rooms and administrative offices for the forestry property.

After Rothschild's death in 1911, his son Louis Nathaniel de Rothschild (1882–1955), President of the Creditanstalt and one of the most influential men in the monarchy, took over the property. He had the interior of the private rooms on the upper floor redesigned in the Louise Francais style with characteristic white furniture by de Cour (Paris). In 1938 he was arrested by the SS. An enormous ransom was extorted for his departure, the castle and land were expropriated and became state property (Reichsforstmeister).

=== World War II to present ===
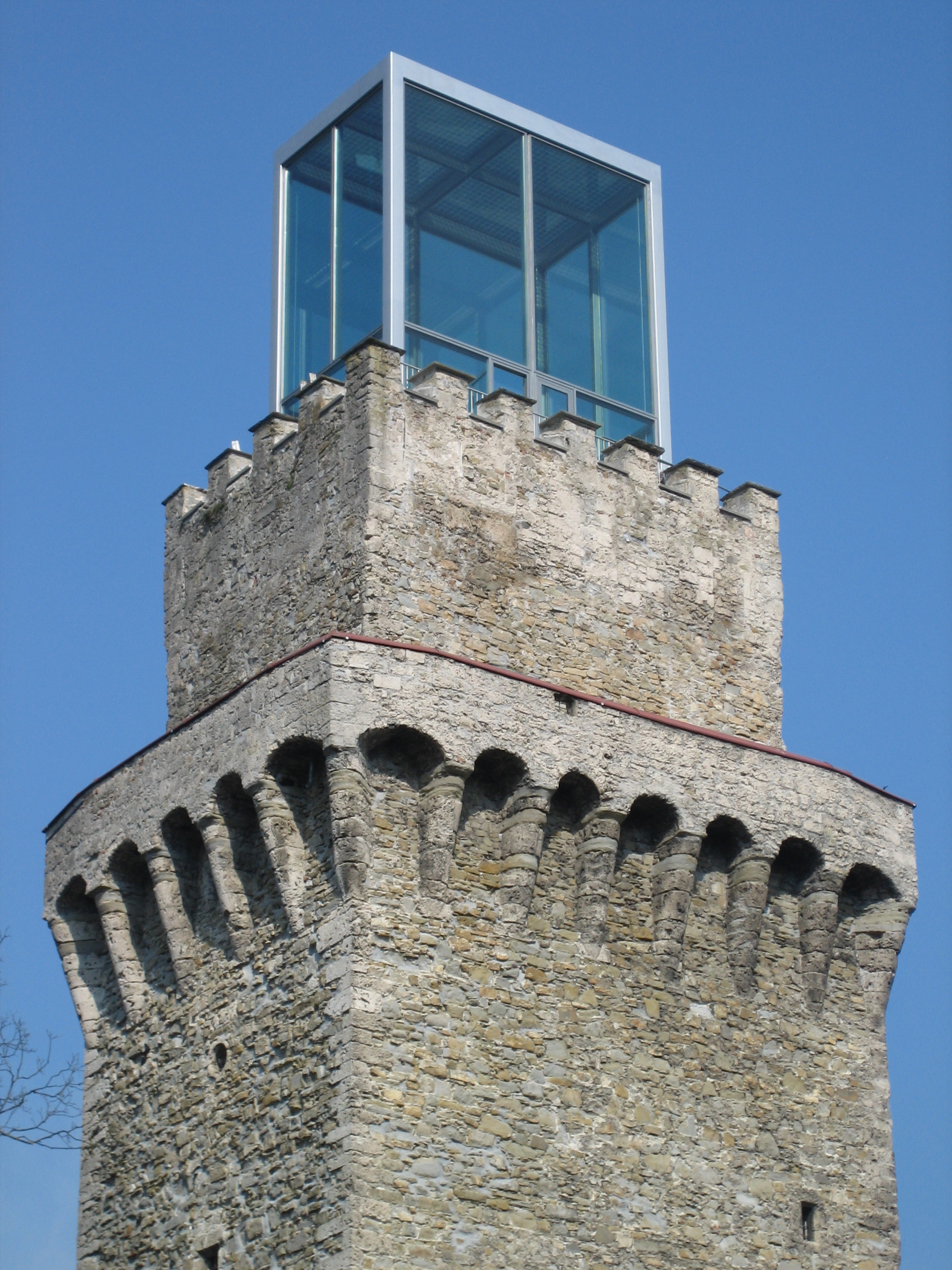
Keep built around 1380–1410. Metal-glass construction from 2006

In 1943, the Gau leadership transferred the castle to the town of Waidhofen. General Lothar Rendulic, Commander-in-Chief of Army Group South and Army Group Ostmark, had his last headquarters in Waidhofen Castle. Here he discussed the terms of the armistice with American negotiators on 6 May 1945, and on 7 May the surrender of Army Group South was signed in Steyr with the Commander-in-Chief of the Third American Army. The next day Rendulic left the castle for good and went into American captivity with his staff.

In the first weeks after the end of the war, the castle was badly damaged by looting by the population and was then confiscated by the Soviet occupying forces for several years, which ultimately led to the complete destruction of the interior. In addition, in 1946, part of the castle tower collapsed onto the roof of the main building. Eventually, it was returned to its rightful owner, Louis Rothschild, who, however, donated it to the Austrian state in return for the promise to take over the pensions of his former servants.

In 1949, one of the three Austrian Federal Forestry schools was set up in the completely renovated castle. Since 1953, the popular castle courtyard plays of the Volksbühne Waidhofen have taken place in the inner courtyard.

As part of a school reform, Austria's only forestry school was built here in 1974/75. In 2002, the castle was sold to the town of Waidhofen to be used for cultural and tourist purposes, and the school was moved to alternative accommodation. Since then, the old name "Rothschild Castle" has been increasingly used again to clearly distinguish Waidhofen Castle from the "Schloss an der Eisenstrasse" hotel and event center opposite.

The well-known Austrian architect Hans Hollein was brought in to adapt the castle at record speed from 2006 to 2007. In addition to the complete redesign of the interior, a number of interventions that clearly contrasted with the historical building structure by using glass and metal resulted in a new interpretation of the castle building that was noticed but extremely controversial among the Waidhofen residents. The state exhibition hosted in the castle in 2007 brought this conflict to Austria-wide attention and also became the most important election issue in the local council elections in March 2007.

The Lower Austrian State Exhibition 2007 was held under the title "Fire & Earth" at two locations in the Mostviertel: In the Rothschild Castle in Waidhofen an der Ybbs, which represented the Iron Road, the element "fire" was presented from a cultural history perspective, from mythology to modern art. Various physical and technical aspects were also taken into account. In the St. Peter in der Au Castle, in keeping with the Moststraße there, the element "earth" was the focus. 401,000 visitors were counted at both venues together.

After a further adaptation in the winter of 2007/08, the castle now serves various purposes for the town of Waidhofen: It houses the town's historical "5e Museum", the town archives, the Iron Road Library, the library, the wedding hall, a multifunctional event hall, rooms for medieval events and the tourist information office.

== See also ==
- List of castles in Austria
