= Waidhofen an der Ybbs =

Waidhofen an der Ybbs Waidhofen an der Ybbs
- Statutory city
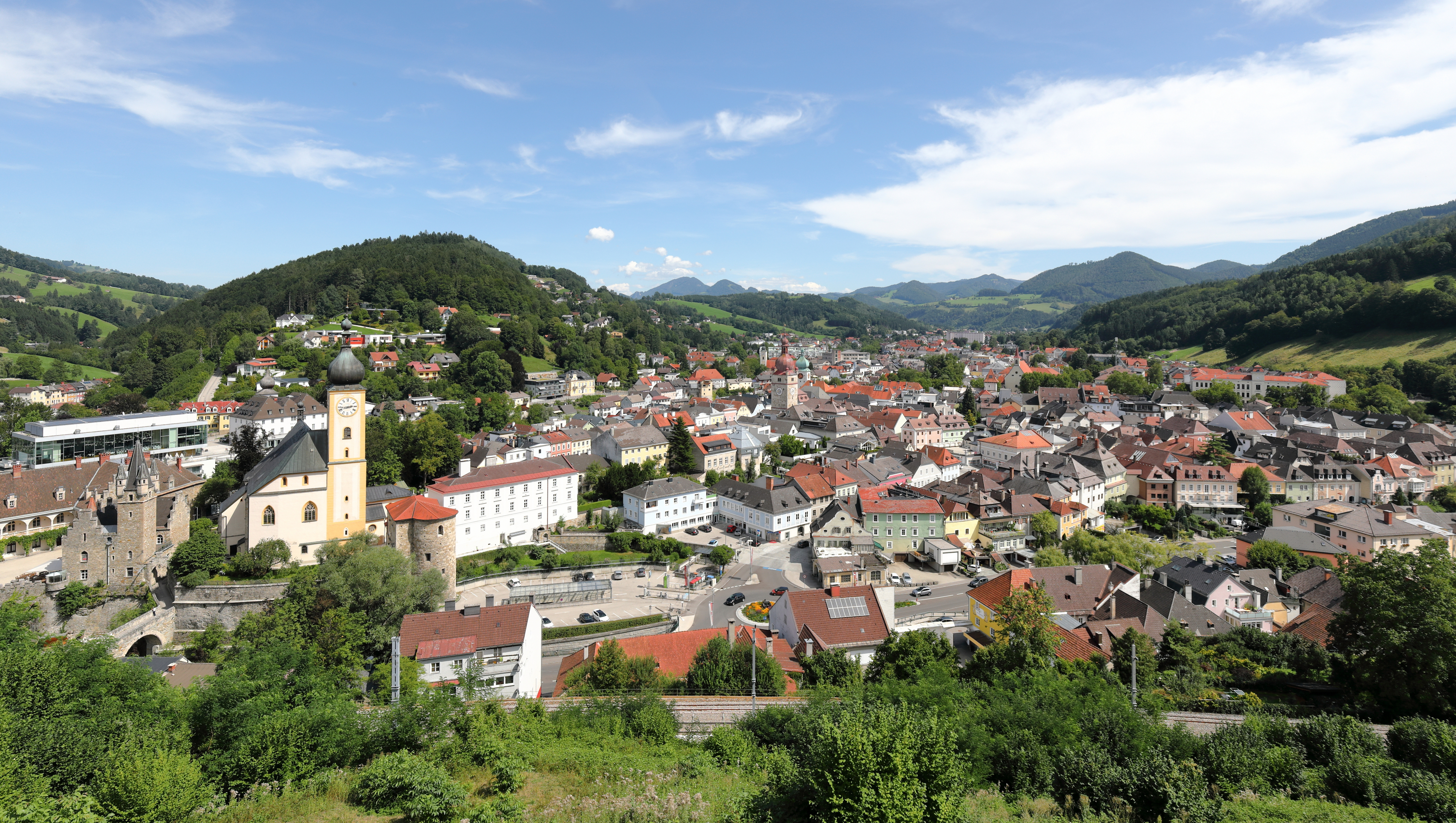
- Waidhofen an der Ybbs, centre

- Flag Coat of arms

- Location within Austria Waidhofen an der Ybbs (Austria)
- Coordinates: 47°58′00″N 14°46′00″E
- Country: Austria
- State: Lower Austria
- District: Statutory city

Government
  - Mayor: Werner Krammer (ÖVP)

Area
  - Total: 131.57 km^{2} (50.80 sq mi)
- Elevation: 356 m (1,168 ft)

Population (2018-01-01)
  - Total: 11,333
  - Density: 86.137/km^{2} (223.09/sq mi)
- Time zone: UTC+1 (CET)
  - Summer (DST): UTC+2 (CEST)
- Postal code: 3340
- Area code: 07442
- Vehicle registration: WY
- Website: www.waidhofen.at

Waidhofen an der Ybbs (Austrian German: [vaɪdˈhoːfn̩ an deːɐ̯ ˈɪps], lit. 'Waidhofen on the Ybbs') is a statutory city (Statutarstadt) in the Austrian state of Lower Austria. The city had a population of 11,662 as of the 2001 census and an area of 131.56 km^{2}. It was first mentioned in 1186 and has been the economic centre of the Ybbstal region since the 14th century.

== Sites and attractions ==
Innenstadt: Waidhofen's Old City has many late medieval houses and public buildings enclosed within the old city walls. Several Gothic courtyards and arcades are still present, as are many renovated facades in the Biedermeier, Neo-Renaissance and Neo-Baroque styles.

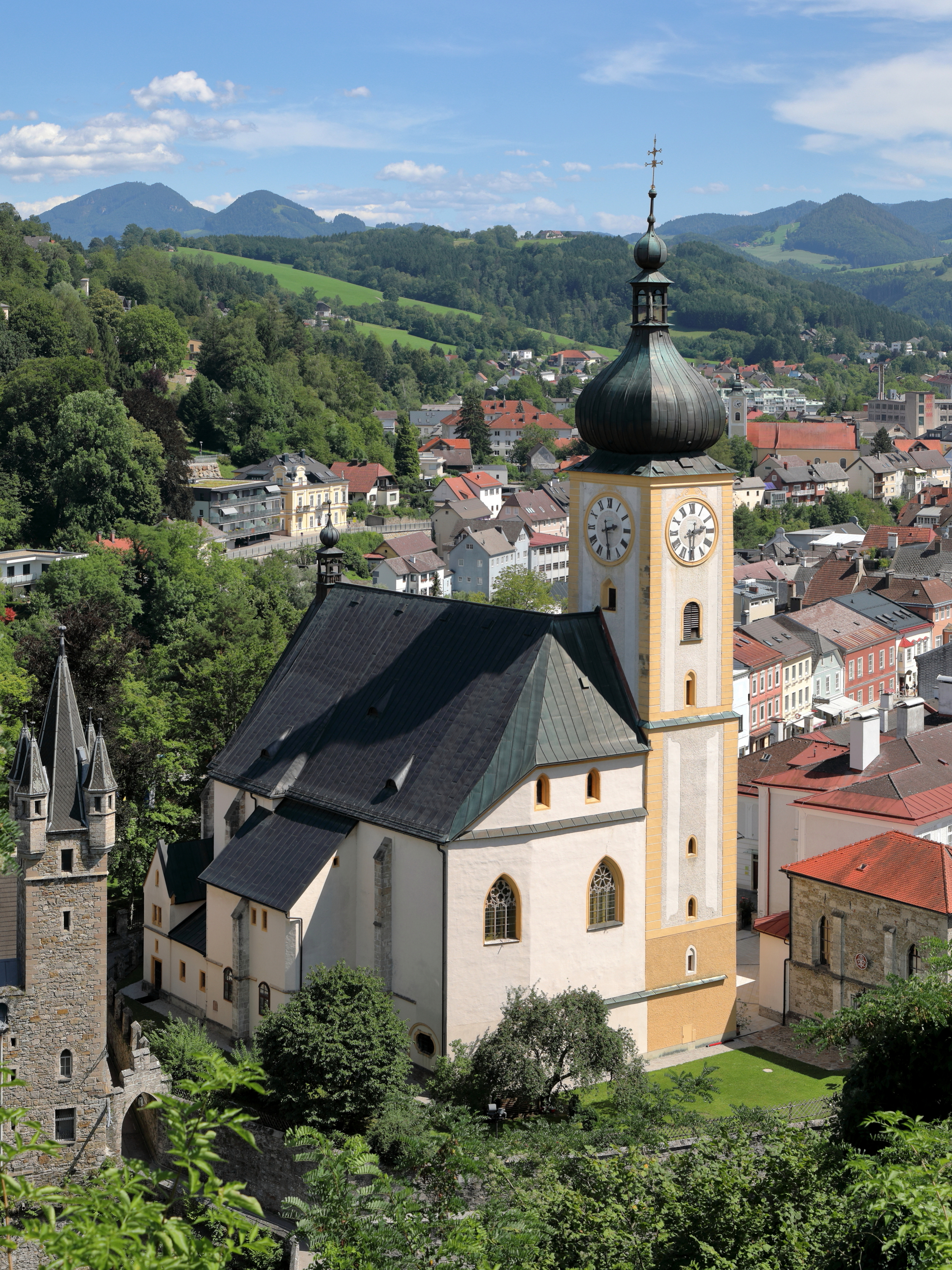
Parish church of Waidhofen an der Ybbs

Stadtpfarrkirche: One of Waidhofen's largest and most historic churches, the Stadtpfarrkirche was built between 1470 and 1510. The interior of the church is home to a Gothic winged altar, transplanted to the site from another church in the 1930s. The church's wooden gate dates from the time of original construction.

Rothschildschloss: A castle has existed on this site inside the Old City since the twelfth century, although the oldest portions of today's building was built around 1400. The building was home to the region's Bavarian governors out of Freising for centuries and thus the administrative center of the region. The castle is named after the most important former owner, the banker Albert Salomon Anselm Freiherr von Rothschild (1844–1910). An extensive renovation in the late nineteenth century again altered the character of the castle, as did a redesign in 2006/2007 that made use of contrasting modern materials like glass and steel. In 2007, the Rothschildschoss was home to the Lower Austrian Provincial Exhibition and today the castle houses a park, gift shop, and tourism center. The building also houses the 5e-Museum, named after the five elements – fire, water, wood, earth, and metal – that the museum focuses on thematically. During Advent, the castle and its grounds host the town's Christmas market, with crafts, food, punch, music, etc. Once a month during the school year, the castle's interior is transformed into "Crystal Club".

Stadtturm (City Tower): This square clock tower is one of the foremost symbols of the city and, at 50 m high, is clearly visible for many miles. It was constructed in the 1530s with the spoils from the expulsion of the invading Turkish hordes. The inscription, dating from 1932, reads "In the year 1532 the citizens, smiths, and farmers forced the Turkish to flee, and built this tower in remembrance." One of the faces of the tower is set permanently to 11:45 to commemorate the hour of the citizens' victory.

Ybbsturm and Stadttor (Ybbs Tower and City Gate): Another of Waidhofen's towers, the Ybbsturm is the only surviving medieval gate tower in the city walls. The city's motto is inscribed here in Latin: Ferrum chalybsque urbis nutrimenta – "Iron and Steel Nourish the City."

Mariensäule: This baroque column and figure of the Virgin Mary in the center of the city was constructed in 1665 as a symbol of the Counter-Reformation.

Schwarzbachviadukt: This historic bridge from the late nineteenth century crosses the valley of the Schwarzbach (Black Stream) just outside the city center. It is used by the narrow-gauge Ybbstalbahn (Ybbs Valley Railway), which formerly ran from Waidhofen to Lunz am See, but now provides a shortened service across the city.

Krautberg: This small hill just a short walk from town, easily identifiable by its large white cross, offers a view of the old city. From the Stadt train station on Reichenauer Strasse, cross the train tracks and climb the path called the Reinhold Klaus Weg.

Wallfahrtskirche Basilika Sonntagberg: There is a large and important Catholic pilgrimage site located just north of Waidhofen. The baroque church, built in 1706–1732, is clearly visible across the surrounding area and has had the status of a minor basilica since 1964. It is possible to walk there from Waidhofen (about a 10 km walk), but it is quicker to take a short train ride to Rosenau and the hike the remaining 5 km to the peak and the church.

== Notable people ==
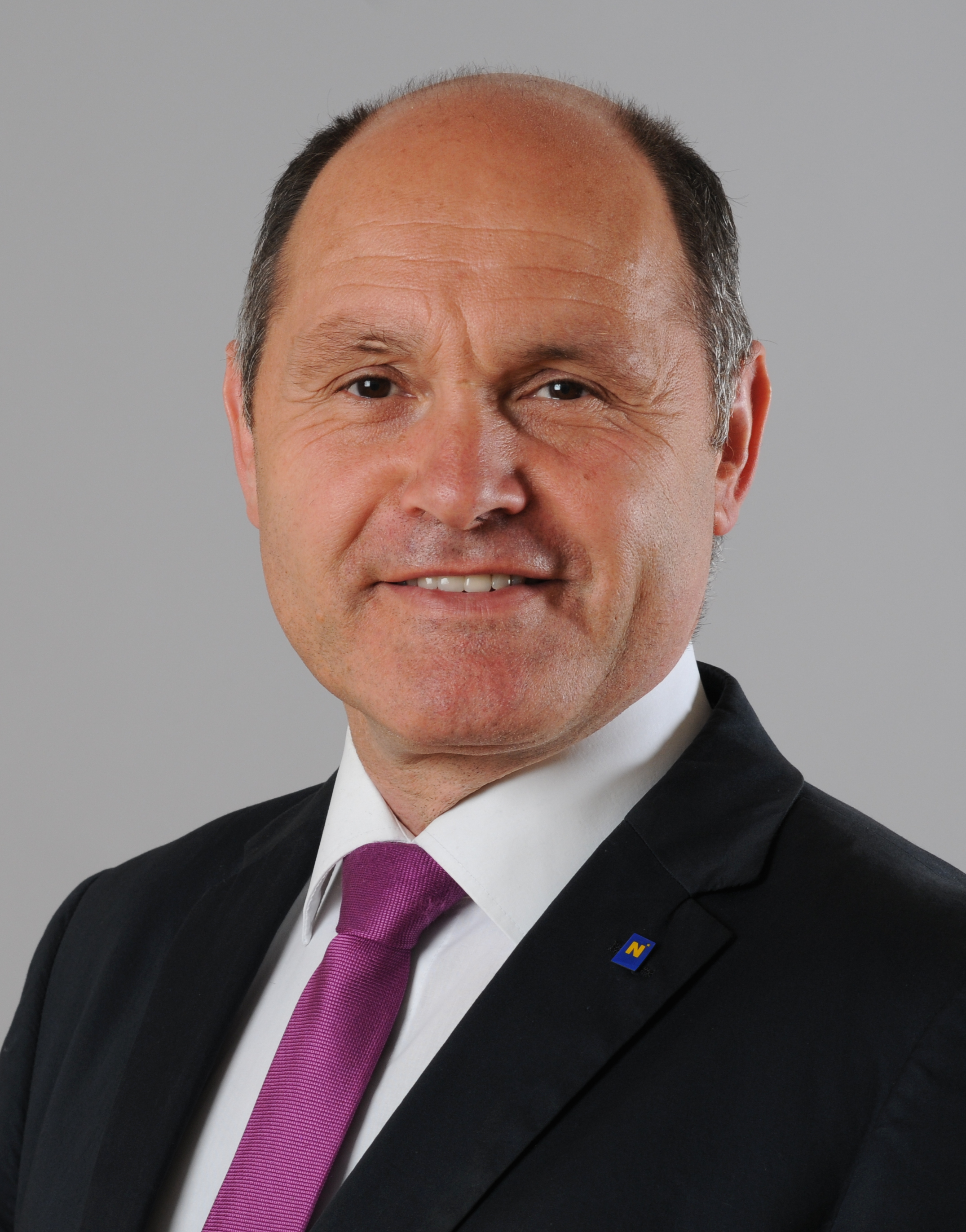
Wolfgang Sobotka, 2013

- Ferdinand Andri (1871–1956), architect
- Alexander Lernet-Holenia, (1897–1976), poet, novelist and writer of screenplays and historical studies
- Frieda Berryhill (1922–2012), an American anti-nuclear and peace activist.
- Rainer Küchl, (born 1950), violinist
- Wolfgang Sobotka (born 1956), teacher, conductor and politician
- Bert Ehgartner (born 1962), author, journalist, screenwriter, executive producer and director.
- Babsie Steger (born 1968), TV presenter and actress, dancer and singer.
- Günther Groissböck (born 1976), operatic bass.

=== Sport ===
- Georg Zellhofer (born 1960), football manager and a former player who played 305 games
- Richard Lietz (born 1983), professional racing driver for Porsche.
- Kilian Fischhuber (born 1983), rock climber, does bouldering and sport climbing
- Melanie Klaffner, (born 1990), tennis player.

=== John Irving ===
The American novelist John Irving chose Waidhofen an der Ybbs and Vienna as the main settings of his early novel Setting Free the Bears.

=== Adolf Hitler as an honorary citizen ===
It took until May 2011 for the municipal council of Waidhofen an der Ybbs to finally vote in favour of repealing Adolf Hitler's honorary citizenship.

== Twin cities ==
- Tuttlingen, Baden-Württemberg, Germany
- Bischofszell, Thurgau, Switzerland

== See also ==
- Ybbs
