= Château de Ferrières =

Château in Seine-et-Marne, France

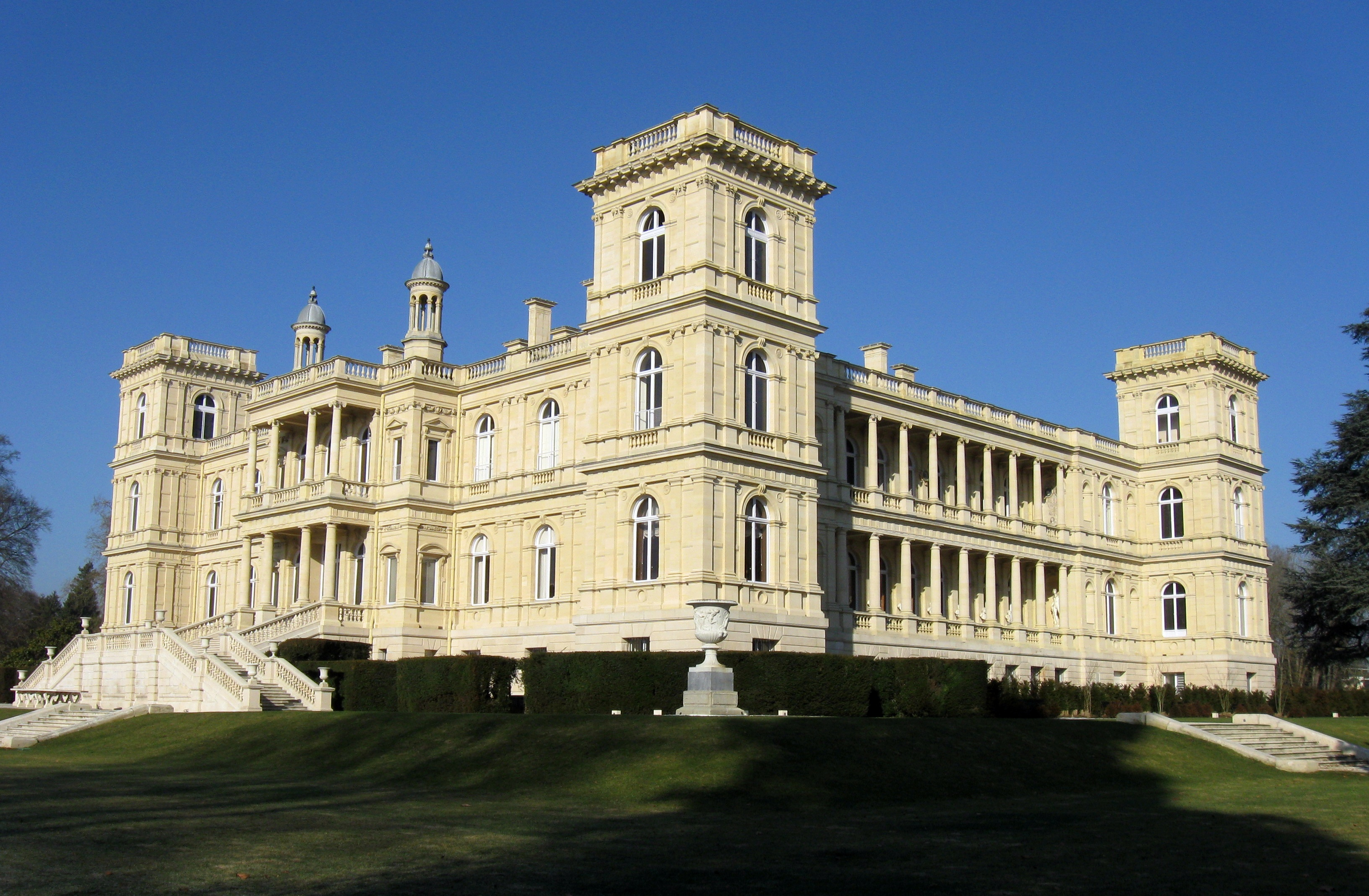

- Location within Île-de-France (region)

General information
- Type: Château
- Architectural style: Neo-Renaissance
- Location: Ferrières-en-Brie, Seine-et-Marne, France
- Coordinates: 48°49′11″N 2°42′43″E
- Construction started: 1855
- Completed: 1859

The Château de Ferrières (French pronunciation: [ʃɑto d(ə) fɛʁjɛʁ]) is a French château built between 1855 and 1859 for Baron James de Rothschild in Goût Rothschild style in Ferrières-en-Brie, Seine-et-Marne, France, some 26 km east of Paris.

James de Rothschild originally bought the property in 1829 from the heirs of Joseph Fouché, a minister of Napoleon. At that time, the property consisted of only a small castle on the bank of a pond with a few additional land plots that James de Rothschild added through successive acquisitions. Rothschild ownership of the Château de Ferrières was passed down through the male line according to the rule of primogeniture, until it was donated by Guy and Marie-Hélène de Rothschild in 1975 to the University of Paris. Considered to be the largest and most luxurious 19th-century château in France, it can be reached from Rue Rucherie in the town of Ferrières-en-Brie.

== Early history ==
Sitting at the crest of a long entry drive, the château was designed by the English architect Joseph Paxton. The inspiration for the design of Ferrières was Mentmore Towers in Buckinghamshire, England, the house that Paxton had built for Baron James's nephew, Mayer Amschel de Rothschild. On seeing Mentmore, Baron James is reputed to have summoned Paxton and ordered him to "Build me a Mentmore, but twice the size".

Built in the Neo-Renaissance style inspired by the architecture of the Italian Renaissance, with square towers at each corner, the house sits on a formal terrace that gives way to 1.25 km² of gardens in a parkland landscaped à l'anglaise that was part of a surrounding 30 km² forest contained in the estate. The showpiece central hall is 120 feet (37 m) long and 60 feet (18 m) high, its roof a full glass skylight. The sculpting of the interior atlas columns and caryatids was by Charles Henri Joseph Cordier, and the decorative painting was supervised by Eugène Lami. The massive library held more than 8,000 volumes. Because lavish entertaining was important, in addition to the private Rothschild apartments, the Château de Ferrières was built with eighty guest suites. Ferrières was inaugurated 16 December 1862 with a gala attended by Napoleon III.

Baron James acquired a vast collection of works of art, and statues adorned a number of the château's rooms. Several of the many sculptures were by Alexandre Falguière and the 18th-century Italian, Antonio Corradini and the Baron's son later added works by René de Saint-Marceaux.

"No Kings could afford this! It could only belong to a Rothschild"
— Wilhelm I, the Emperor of Germany, on visiting Ferrières.

During the Franco-Prussian War of 1870-71, the Château de Ferrières was seized by the Germans and was the site of negotiations between Otto von Bismarck, Chancellor of the North German Confederation, and the French Minister of Foreign Affairs, Jules Favre. During World War I, the children of the family, Guy de Rothschild with his sisters and cousins Diane, Alain, Cécile and Elie, were sent to the safety of the chateau, when the Germans approached Paris close enough to be able to bombard it. Guy recalled that they found it amusing to be awoken at night by the sounds of Big Bertha and hide under the cage of the grand staircase, which, according to the words of the architect, provided the best protection in the house. One time, an explosion at the ammunition warehouse in La Courneuve that broke the windows of the chateau kept them there for hours until the good news were brought that they were safe to leave the protected area. The Germans again seized the château during the occupation of France in World War II, and this time, they looted its vast art collections.

The château remained empty until 1959, when Guy de Rothschild and his new wife, Marie-Hélène de Zuylen van Nyevelt, set about refurbishing it. From 1959, they hosted regular parties at the château, the theme of which would be personally designed by artists or designers such as Yves Saint Laurent. Their parties would mainly consist of aristocrats, but they always included many of her friends from a wider society, such as Brigitte Bardot, Grace Kelly and Audrey Hepburn.

== Recent history ==
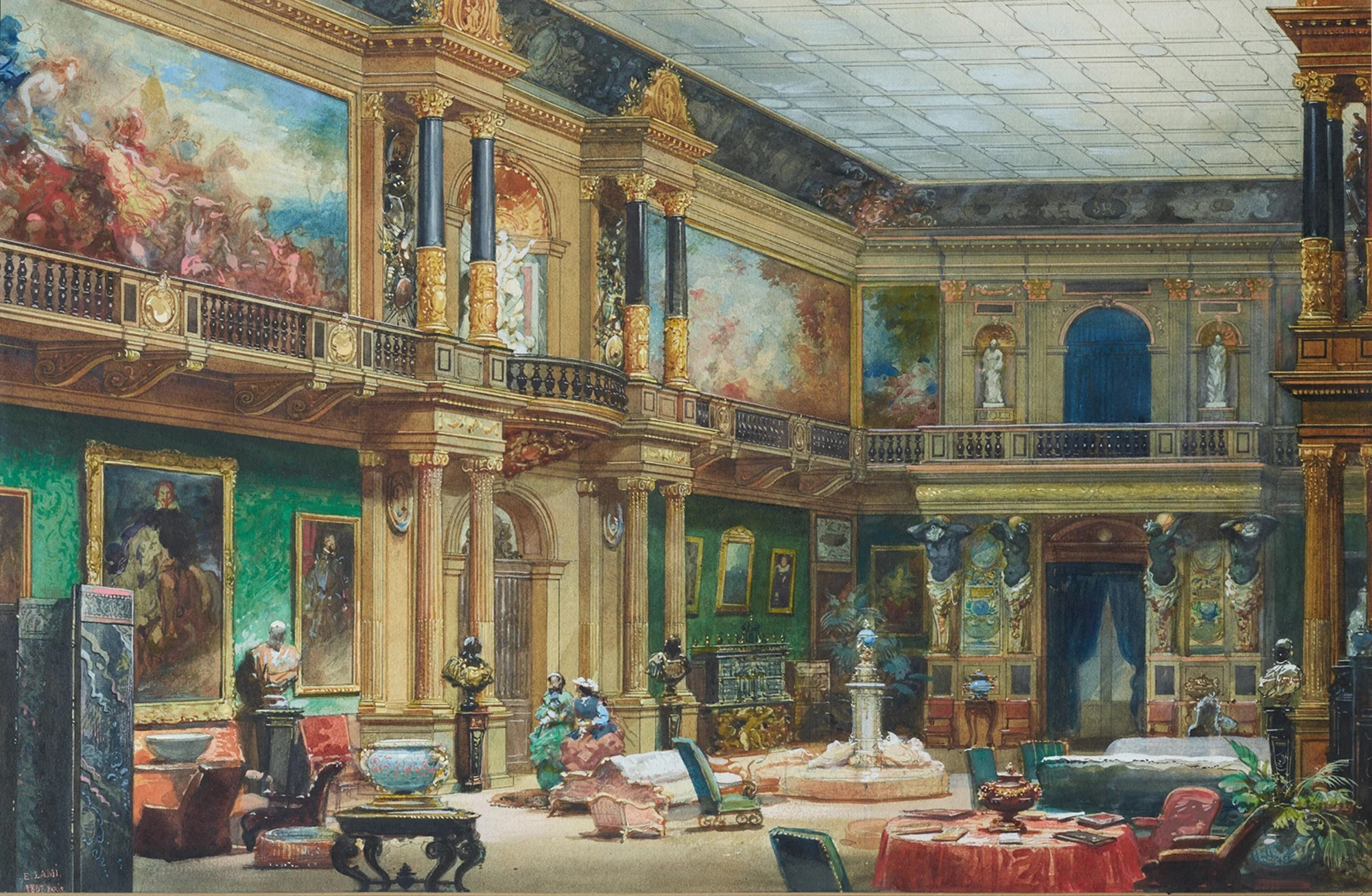
Watercolour painting of the Great Hall, by Eugène Lami

On 12 December 1972, the château hosted the Surrealist Ball, organised by Baroness Marie-Hélène de Rothschild. Designed with a dreamlike, Dali-inspired aesthetic, the event featured fur-covered plates, taxidermied centrepieces, and an elite guest list that included Salvador Dalí and Audrey Hepburn.

In 1975, Guy de Rothschild and his wife Marie-Hélène donated the château to the chancellery of the University of Paris for charitable purposes.

Since 2015, the property has been home to the "École Ferrières", a private institution specialising in gastronomy and hospitality. Two restaurants operate on-site: "Le Baron" and "Le Chai".

== In popular culture ==
- Several episodes of Highlander: The Series and Highlander: The Raven were filmed at the château between 1995 and 1999
- Scenes in the Roman Polanski film The Ninth Gate (2000) were filmed at the château in 1998
- An episode of the TV series Relic Hunter (1999-2002) was filmed at the château
- The music video of American singer Beyoncé’s song "Partition" was filmed at the château in 2013
- The music video of French singer Indila's song "Tourner dans le vide" was filmed at the château in 2014
- Scenes in the film The Count of Monte Cristo were filmed there in 2023.
