= Palais Rothschild (Prinz-Eugen-Straße) =

Former palatial residence in Austria

Coordinates: 48.1942806°N 16.3771126°E

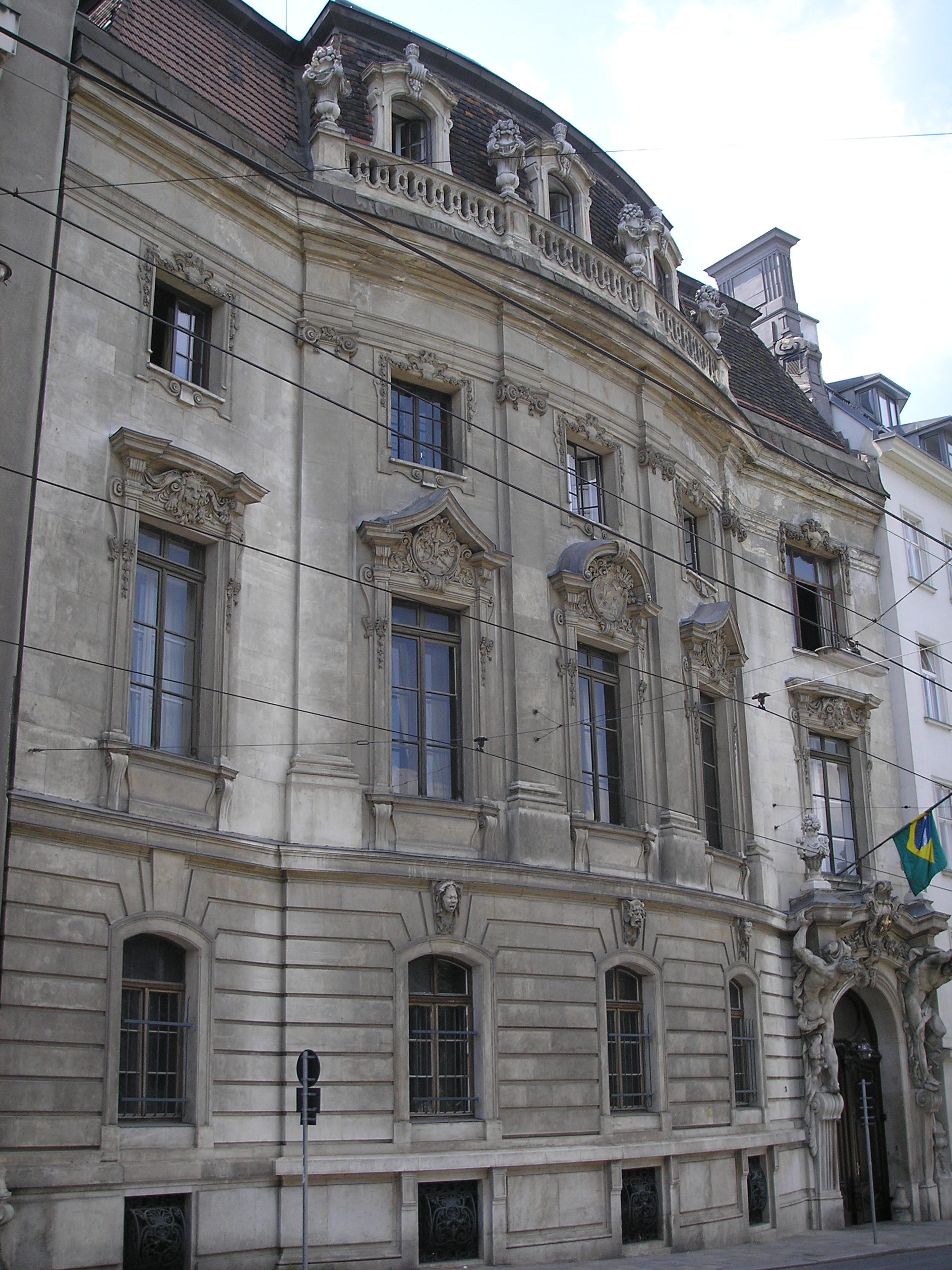
Palais Rothschild at Prinz-Eugen-Straße 26 in Vienna, 2006

The Palais Rothschild (at Prinz-Eugen-Straße 26) is a former palatial residence in Vienna, Austria. It was one of five Palais Rothschild in the city that were owned by members of the Rothschild banking family of Austria.

== History ==
It was the second Palais Rothschild commissioned by Baron Albert von Rothschild, on the same street as his larger Palais Albert Rothschild at Prinz-Eugen-Straße 20-22 (demolished in 1954).

It was designed and built in 1894 by the theatre architects Ferdinand Fellner and Hermann Helmer. The building is four storeys high and was designed in a neobaroque style.

Like all Jewish property at the time, it was seized by the Nazis follow the Anschluss. The Rothschilds were forced to flee Austria and their palaces were thoroughly plundered of their ornaments and artifacts. However, the building survived without structural damage and today serves as the Brazilian embassy in Vienna.
