= Palais Rothschild (Metternichgasse) =

City palace in Vienna, Austria

Coordinates: 48.1970°N 16.3818°E

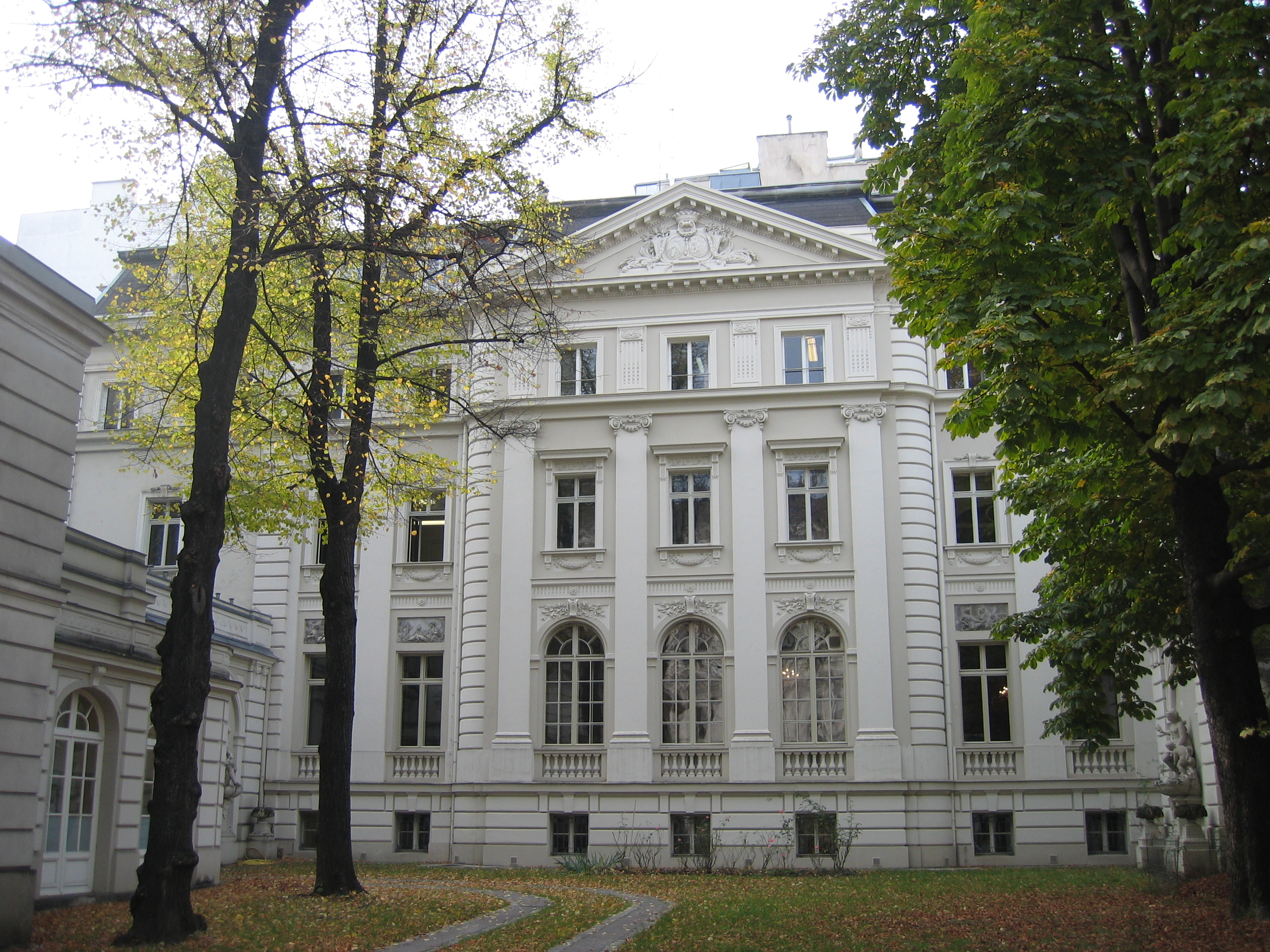
The Palais Rothschild in Metternichgasse

The Palais Rothschild is a former palatial residence in Vienna, Austria. It was one of five Palais Rothschild in the city that were owned by members of the Rothschild banking family of Austria, a branch of the international Rothschild family. It is located at Metternichgasse 8 in Vienna's 3rd district, Landstraße. The building is also known as Palais Springer or Palais Springer-Rothschild, as it was owned by the Springer family before the Rothschild family.

== History ==
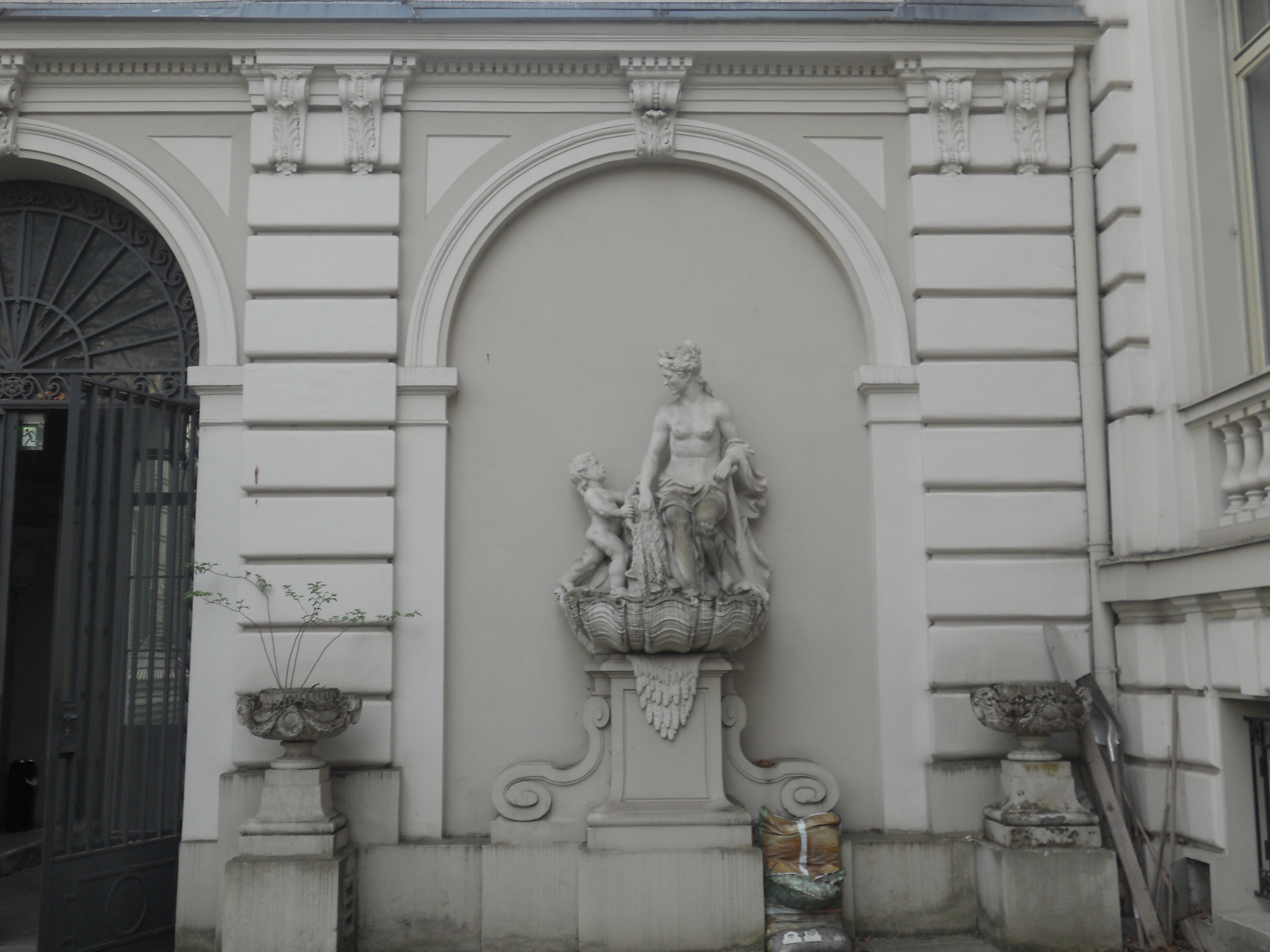
Wall fountain next to the entrance, 2013

The palace was built between 1891 and 1893 for Baron Othon de Bourgoing based on designs by the French architects, Amand Louis Bauqué, and a graphic designer, Albert Emilio Pio, who had previously worked together updating the interiors of Łańcut Castle. In 1890, the year before the Palais Rothschild was built, Baron de Bourgoing had the Palais Bourgoing built by Bauqué and Pio at Metternichgasse 12.

It 1911, it was acquired by Baron Sigismund von Springer and his wife, Valentine Noémi von Rothschild (sixth child of the banker Baron Albert Salomon Anselm von Rothschild), who also owned Sitzenberg Castle near Tulln. The palace served as a family residence until the "Anschluss" in 1938, and the subsequent "Aryanization". From December 1940, the palace was rented to the Army base administration and two private parties. In August 1941, the Dorotheum valuation master, and architect, Ottokar Weigel valued the interior furnishings of the palace at 347,000 Reichsmark.

After the war, it was returned to the family who sold the palace, and Sitzenberg Castle, in 1950 and it became home to the Academy of Music and Art.

=== Present use ===
Until June 2024, the Palais Rothschild housed a branch of the University of Music and Performing Arts Vienna. After the university moves out, the adaptations made for the music university will be reversed by the quasi-governmental company Federal Real Estate Company (known as BIG). The Complexity Science Hub Vienna is scheduled to move from the Palais Strozzi to the Palais Rothschild with over 70 scientists by winter 2024.

== See also ==
- Palais Rothschild
