= Palais Bourgoing =

Coordinates: 48°11′48″N 16°22′56″E

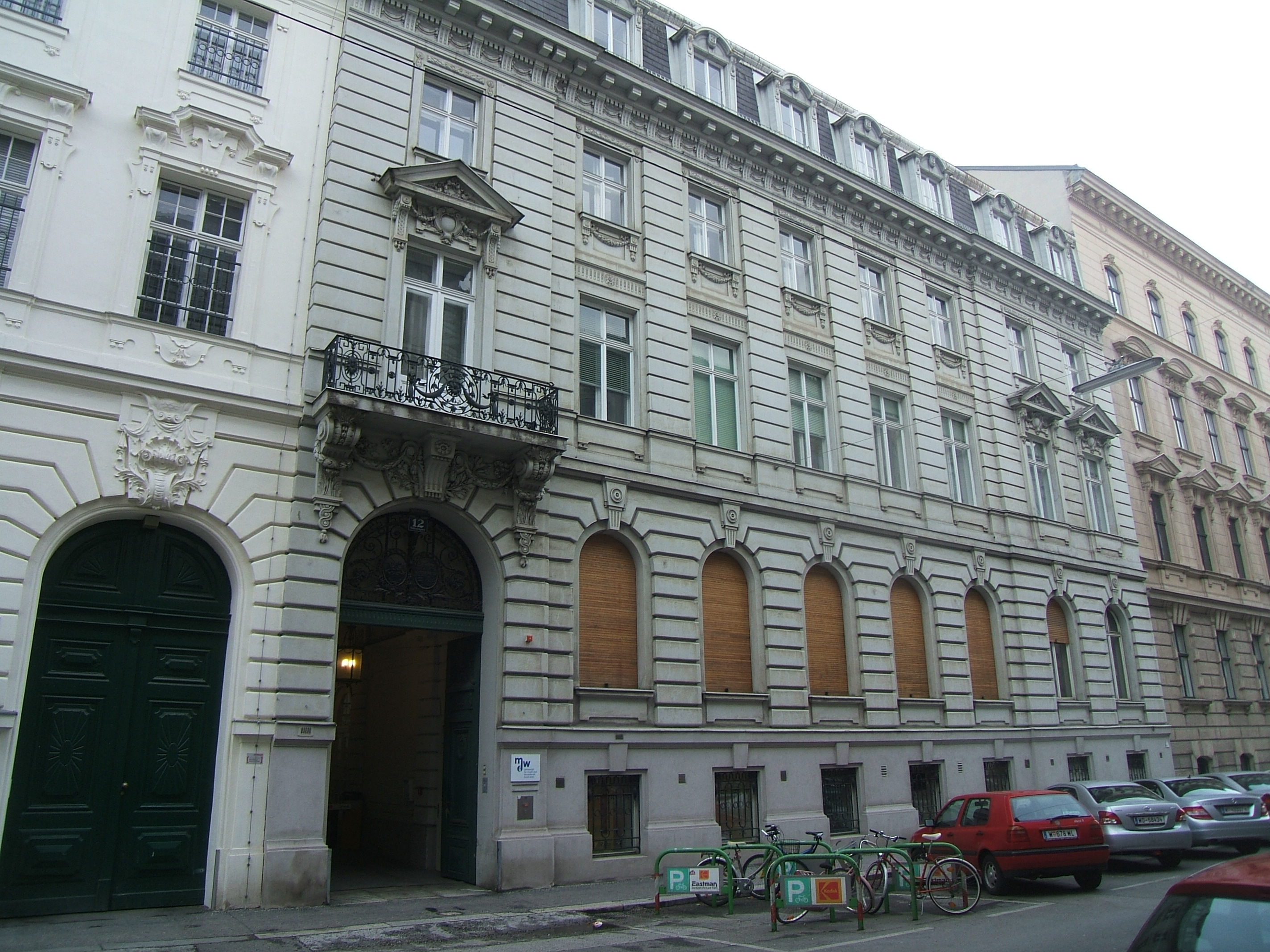
The Palais Bourgoing in Metternichgasse

The Palais Bourgoing is a former palatial residence in Vienna, Austria. It is located at Metternichgasse 12 in Vienna's 3rd district, Landstraße.

== History ==
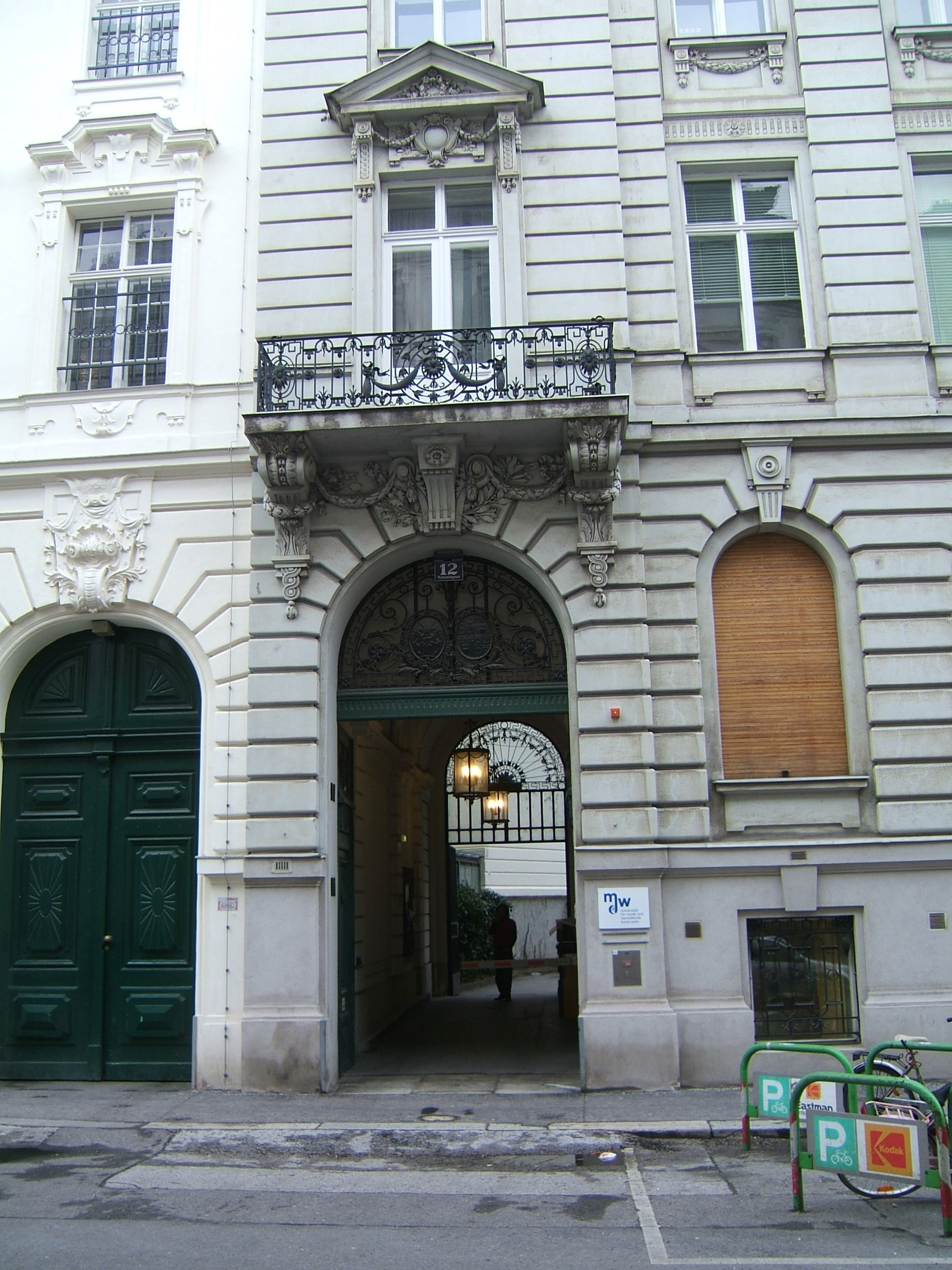
Entrance to the palace

The palace was built in 1890 for Baron Othon de Bourgoing (1839–1908) based on designs by the French architects, Amand Louis Bauqué, and a graphic designer, Albert Emilio Pio, who also worked together updating the interiors of Łańcut Castle. A year at it was completed, Baron de Bourgoing had another palace (today known as the Palais Rothschild) built by Bauqué and Pio at Metternichgasse 8. The company Heinrich and Franz Glaser was commissioned to carry out the construction.

The palace has been home to the Vienna Film Academy since 1968.

=== Architecture ===
The late historicist palace has a banded façade with Neo-Empire decorative elements below the windows on the top floor and in the window lintels under the triangular gables. The building has asymmetrical corner projections and an entrance with latticework in the semicircular arch with coat of arms cartouches. Three consoles with rich Empire decorative elements support a balcony with a wrought iron lattice.

== See also ==
- Palais Rothschild (Metternichgasse)
