= Palais Rothschild =

Viennese palaces owned by the Rothschild family

Coordinates: 48°11′42″N 16°22′22″E

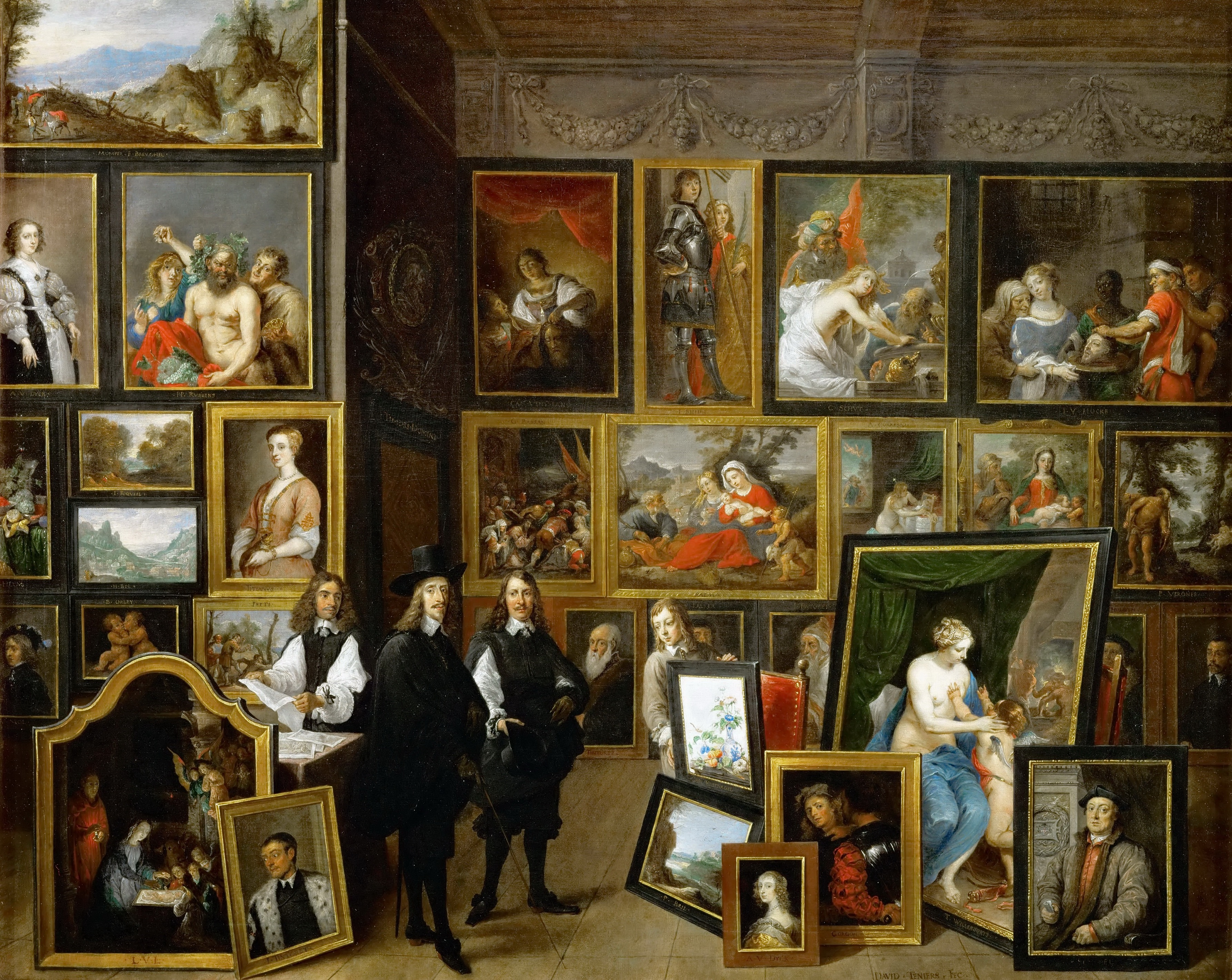
Archduke Leopold Wilhelm in his gallery in Brussels by David Teniers the Younger

Palais Rothschild refers to a number of palaces in Vienna, Austria, which were owned by members of the Austrian branch of the Rothschild banking family. Apart from their sheer size and elegance, they were famous for the huge collections of valuable paintings, statues, furniture, books and armour that they housed, another reflection of the family's vast wealth and prominent position.

The collections were confiscated by the Nazis in 1938, and the palaces were stripped and ruined during World War II. After the war, the heirs received little compensation. What remained of the buildings was sold off, or destroyed and replaced by modern office buildings. The history of these palaces and the art collections they contained is symbolic of the rise and fall of the Austrian branch of the Rothschild family.

== The palaces ==
The five main Rothschild palaces (Palais Rothschild) in Vienna were:

- Palais Albert Rothschild (demolished in 1954)
- Palais Nathaniel Rothschild (demolished after 1945)
- Palais Rothschild (Metternichgasse)
- Palais Rothschild (Prinz-Eugen-Straße)
- Palais Rothschild (Renngasse)

== The Rothschild collections ==
The extensive art collections of Louis and Alphonse de Rothschild had to be, in effect, given away by their heirs to the Republic of Austria. Complicated laws and bureaucratic red tape made a full restitution almost impossible. The heirs were forced by the state to sell off their belongings, since they were effectively insolvent.

Since Austria regarded itself as a victim of Nazism, and not as one of the perpetrators, Austrian Jewish victims could barely appeal to the courts on their status. Much of the former Rothschild art collection was taken either to the Kunsthistorisches Museum (KHM) or to the Austrian Gallery in the Belvedere palace.

In the late 1990s, due to outside pressure from the United States, a more thorough examination of its role and behaviour during the Second World War took place in Austria. After long and tedious negotiations, the Austrian government agreed in 1999 to return or pay for the roughly 250 Rothschild art treasures that were looted by the Nazis and absorbed into Austrian State Museums. The items were restituted to the heirs in 1999.

Works from the Rothschild collection that used to be kept at the Kunsthistorisches Museum include:

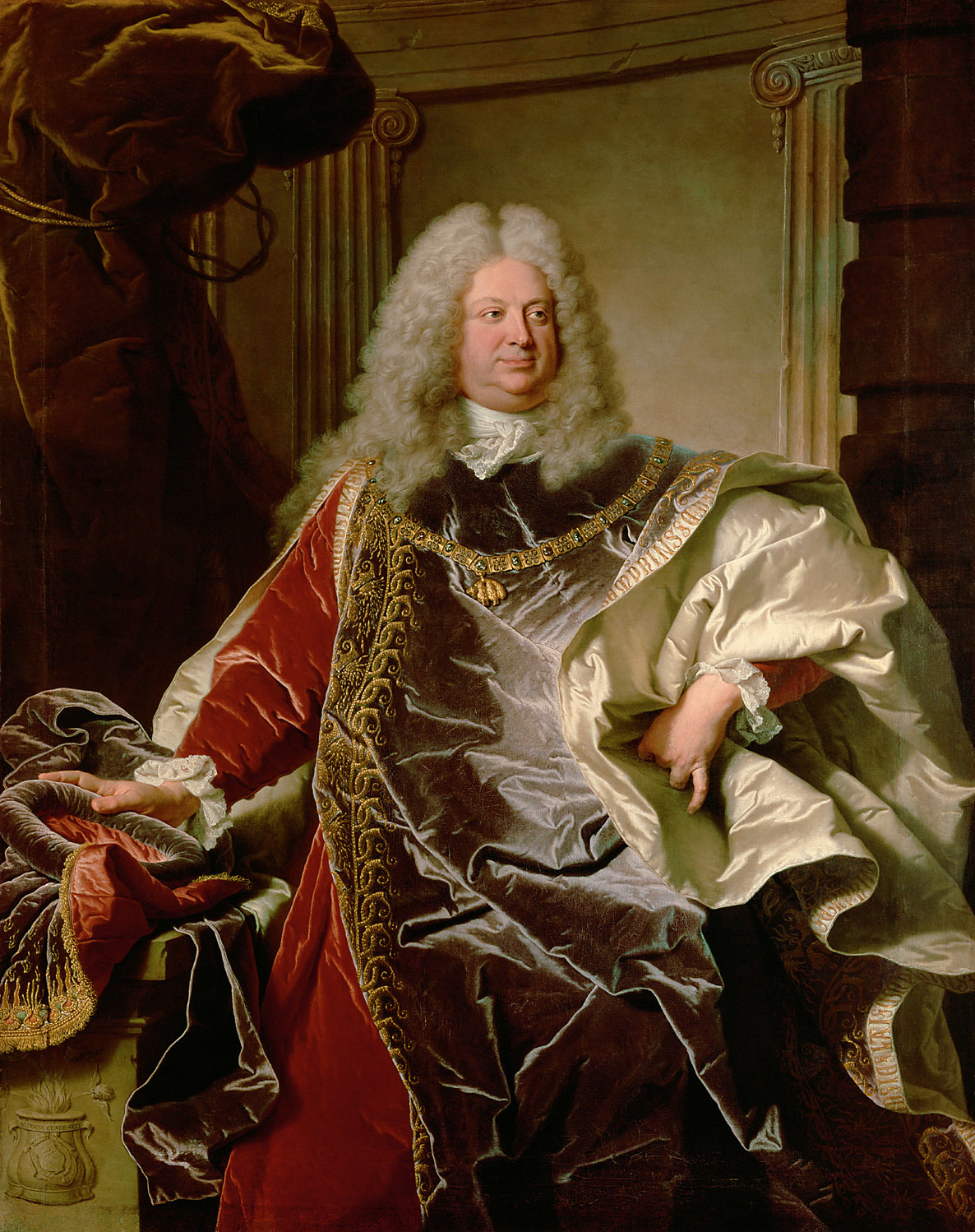
Count Philipp Ludwig Wenzel Sinzendorf by Hyacinthe Rigaud. Given in 1948 by Baronesse Clarisse de Rothschildt in memory of Baron Alphonse de Rothschildt as a "gift"; restituted in 1999 to the Rothschilds; given to the Kunsthistorisches Museum in 1999 by Bettina Loram Rothschild

- Aelbert Cuyp, Landscape with Shepherd and Herd
- Frans Hals, Tielemann Roostermann
- Frans Hals, Portrait of a Man
- Frans Hals, Portrait of a Woman
- Hans de Jode, Muleteer
- Gabriel Metsu, Girl and Officer
- Isaac van Ostade, Stop at the inn
- Hyacinthe Rigaud, Count Philipp Ludwig Wenzel Sinzendorf
- David Teniers the Younger, Archduke Leopold Wilhelm in his gallery in Brussels
- Jan Wynants, Landscape with Hunters
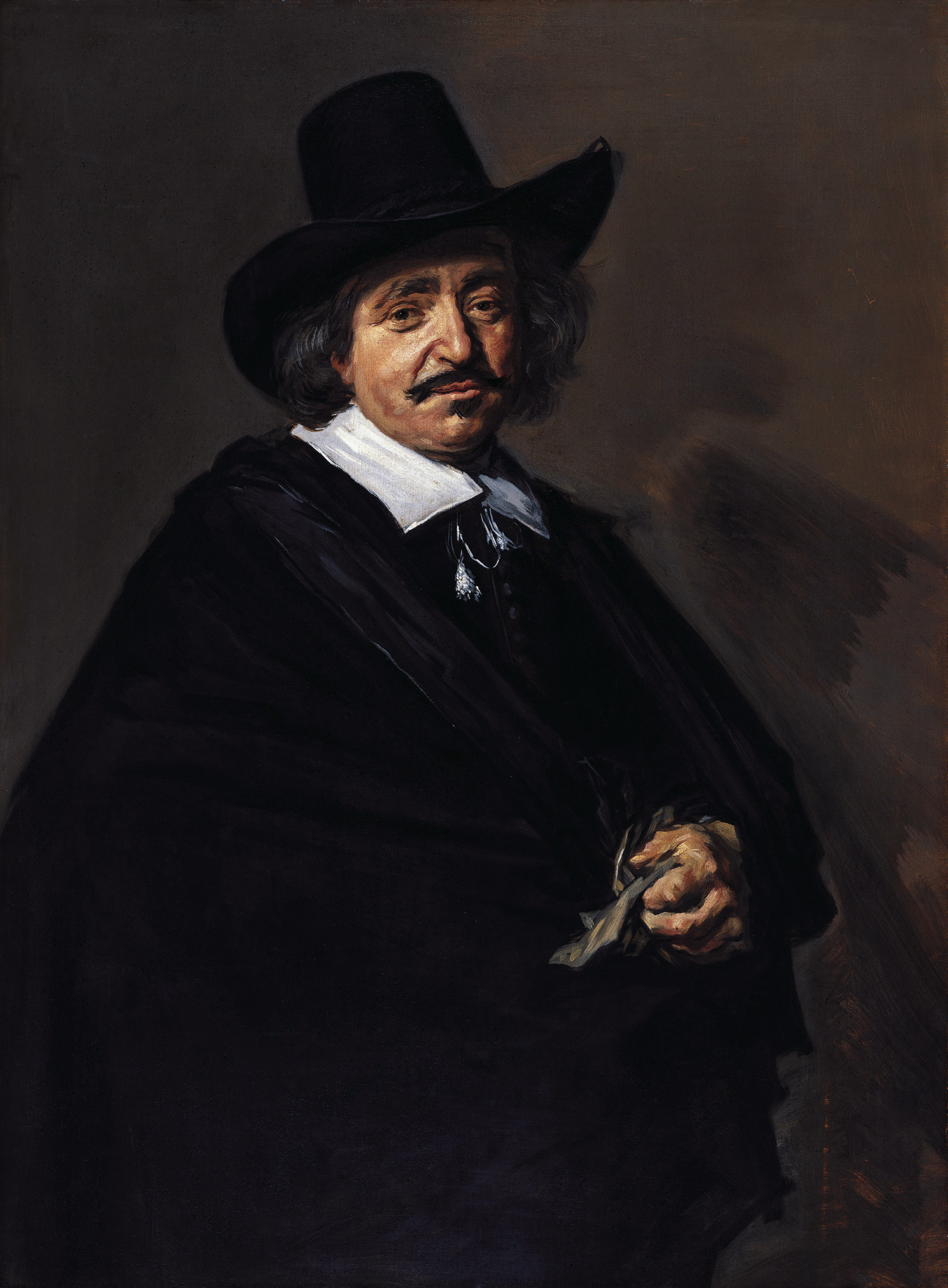
Frans Hals, Portrait of a Man

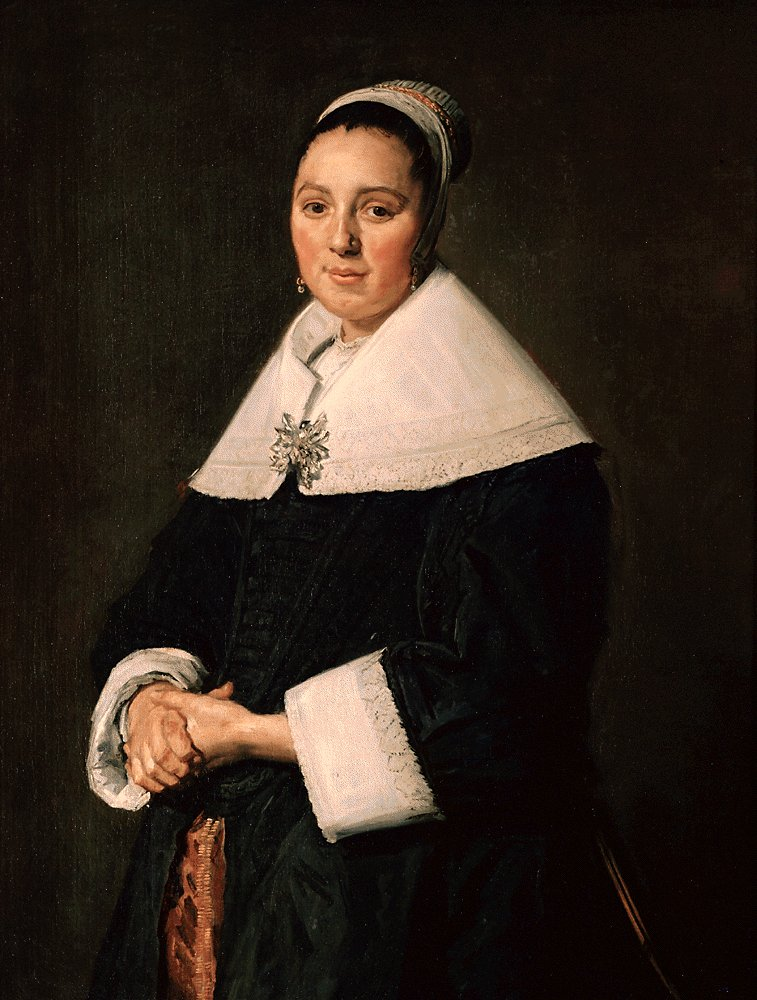
Frans Hals, Portrait of a Woman

In the Österreichische Galerie Belvedere:

- Heinrich Angelt, Portrait of a Woman

== See also ==
- History of Jews in Austria
- National Fund of the Republic of Austria for Victims of National Socialism
- Rothschild family residences
