= Palais Albert Rothschild =

Palatial residence in Vienna, Austria

Coordinates: 48.19478°N 16.3765°E

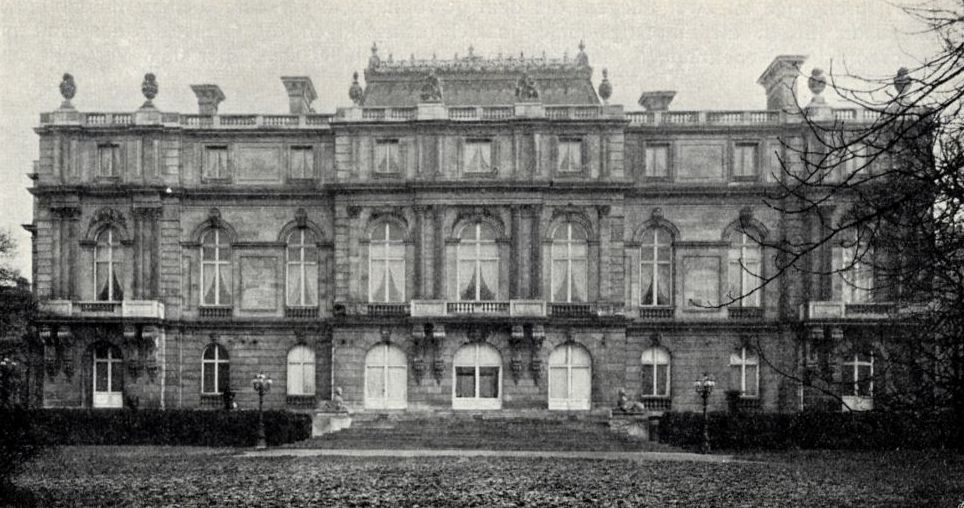
Palais Albert Rothschild, garden front, c. 1906

The Palais Albert Rothschild was a palatial residence in Vienna, Austria. It was one of five Palais Rothschild in the city that were owned by members of the Rothschild banking family of Austria, a branch of the international Rothschild family. It was located at Heugasse 26 (today Prinz-Eugen-Straße 20–22), in the 4th (Wieden) district of Vienna. Commissioned by Baron Albert von Rothschild, it was designed and built by the French architect Gabriel-Hippolyte Destailleur between 1876 and 1884, and demolished in 1954.

== Description ==
The building was unusual for Vienna: designed in the French Neo-Renaissance “hôtel particulier” style, the layout was U-shaped, three storeys high and set back from the street by a courtyard, with the estate fenced off by a high iron grill. Apparently, as a child Baron Albert had lived in Salomon Mayer von Rothschild's house in 1848, which would explain the palace's seclusion from the public. Attached to the palace was a garden, which bordered on Plößlgasse.

The entrance hall to the palace was dominated by an enormous marble staircase, with the walls decorated with priceless gobelins, mirrors and paintings. The ballroom and various salons had ceilings painted by Jean de Witt and Tiepolo, and they were richly decorated with stucco, gold leaf, and heavy hanging crystal chandeliers. The ornate parquet floors were made with expensive rare woods, and the furniture was in the style of Louis-Seize.

A special feature was a large orchestrion, built into a niche between the ballroom and one of the salons. Together with a smaller orchestrion, these two instruments could replace an entire orchestra. In addition to being a private residence, Baron Albert used it to conduct his banking business.

An unusual element of the building was the private observatory, located in the middle projection (Mittelrisalit) at the highest point of the palace. It was reached by a small wooden staircase beginning from the second floor, and it was fitted with numerous telescopes for viewing the stars (the Baron was interested in astronomy).

== Gallery ==
The Palais Albert Rothschild in 1906
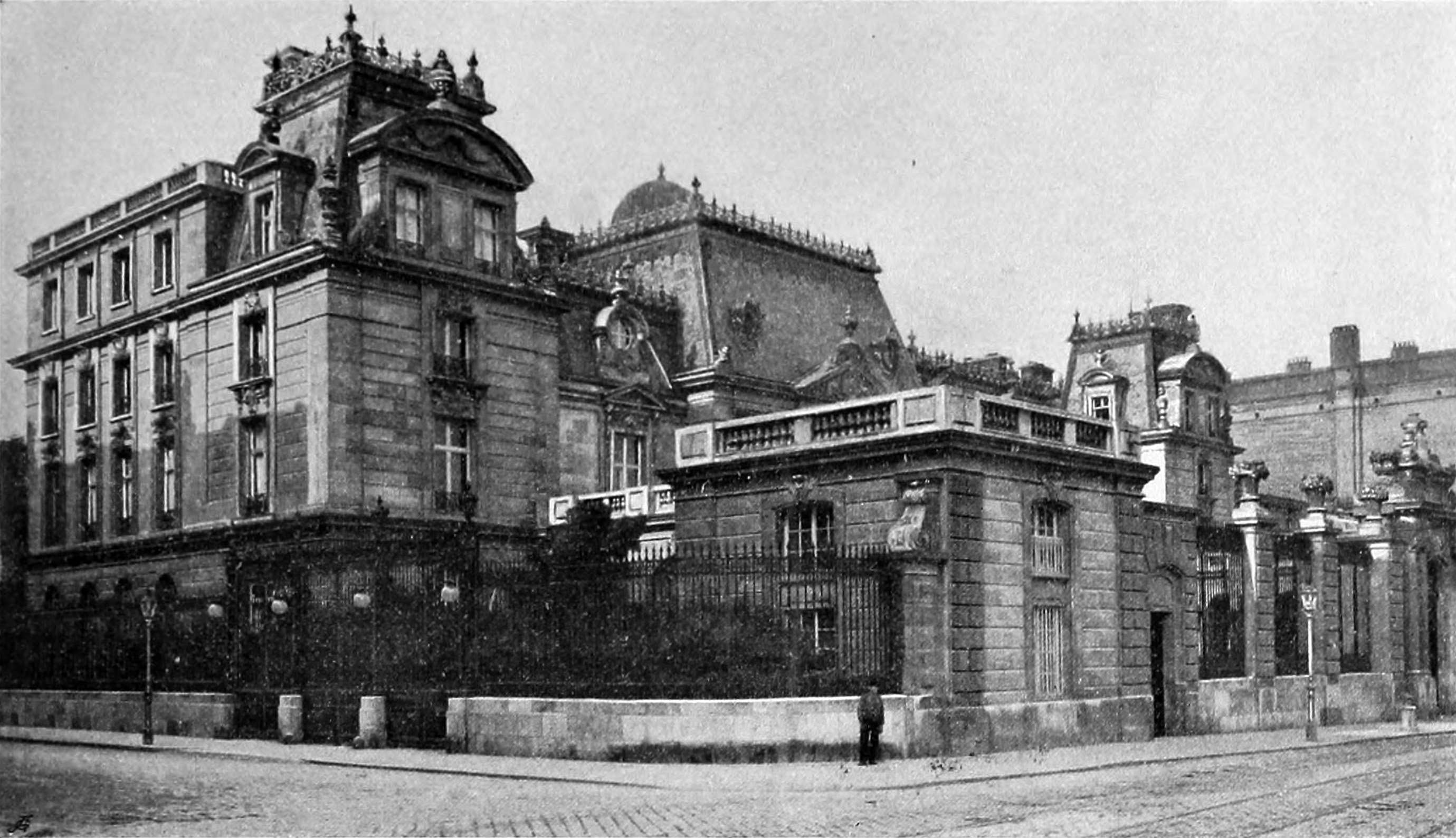
Entrance front

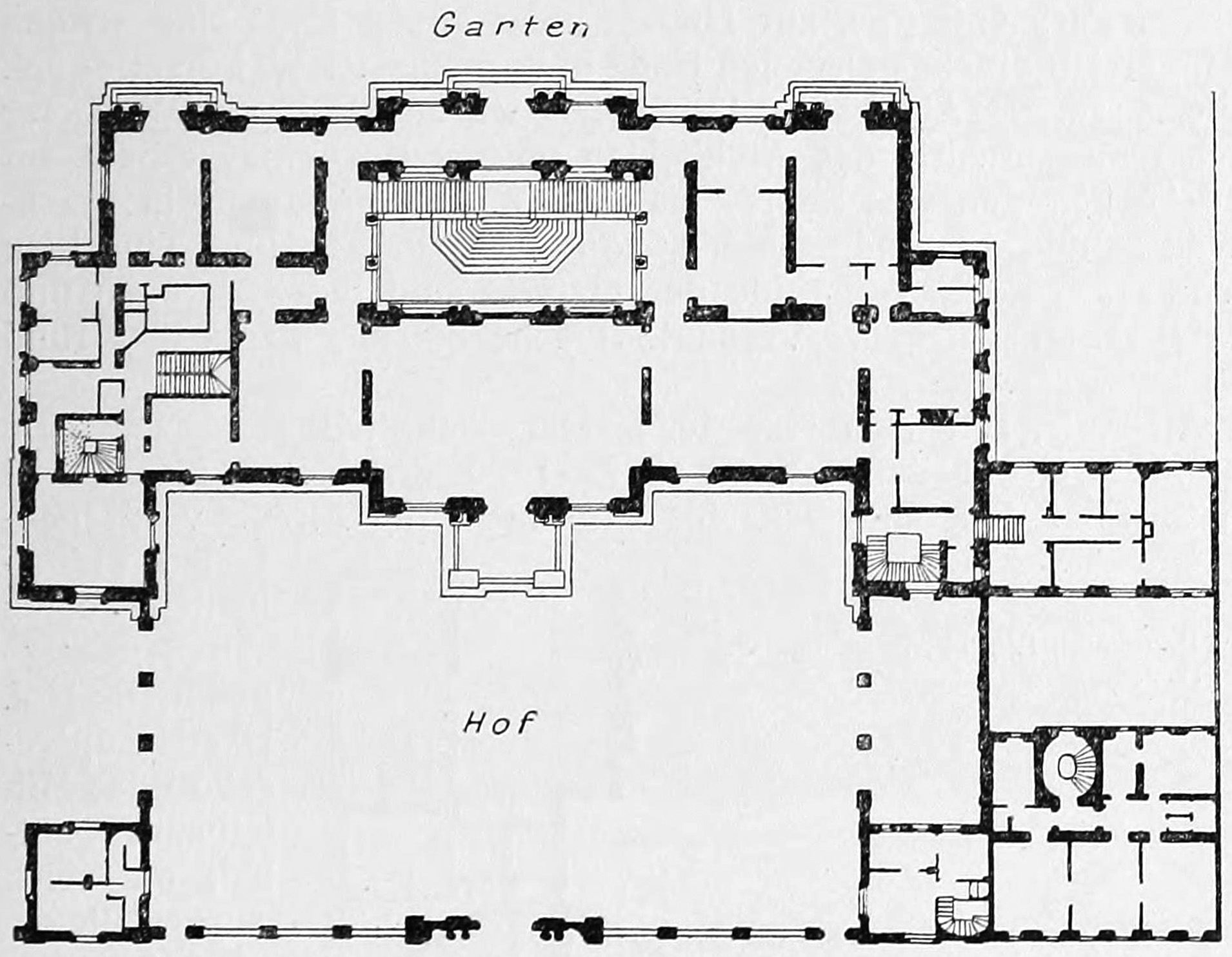
Plan of the ground floor

== History ==
After the Anschluß (annexation) of Austria by Nazi Germany in 1938, the Rothschild family was forced to flee and went into exile in England. Almost immediately, the Nazis turned their attention to the Rothschild art collections, which were the largest and most valuable Jewish-owned art collections in Austria. The treasures of Baron Louis von Rothschild, composed of paintings, statues, furniture, books, armour and coins, were all seized and removed from his house at Theresianumgasse, prior to the Gestapo commandeering the building as its Vienna headquarters.

Adolf Eichmann moved into the palace and set up the infamous Central Agency for Jewish Emigration in Vienna, the "purpose" of which was to "organise" the emigration of Jews from Austria. One of its primary missions was to strip Austrian Jewish citizens of all money and possessions, holding them to ransom in exchange for the hope of receiving emigration permits. Often, the permits were withheld even after all demands had been met, usually guaranteeing the victims a one-way trip to a concentration camp. Despite the difficulties, Eichmann managed to force nearly 45,000 Jews to emigrate from Austria between August and November 1938.

Baron Albert von Rothschild was forced to sign a document giving his consent to the art collection's confiscation, plus the appropriation of all Rothschild assets in Austria by the German government, in exchange for his brother's release from Dachau concentration camp and safe passage for them both out of Austria.

Elsewhere in Vienna, other collections were confiscated and taken to a collection point for examination. In all, 163 collections were confiscated. From this plunder, 269 paintings of high value were picked out, of which 122 were later selected for consideration by Hitler for inclusion in his planned museum in Linz.

A postal and telegram office was set up in the palace itself; it was slightly damaged during the war. Though still standing and functional, by war's end, Baron Louis von Rothschild found it in a state of total neglect, its interior largely plundered by the Nazis.

In the following years, he tried to obtain compensation from the Austrian government for his family's losses and the ruined Rothschild bank. At that time, the government took the stance that Austria had been a victim of the war and therefore not responsible. Many bureaucratic hurdles and much red tape made it almost impossible for any surviving Austrian Jew to get their property back or receive any proper compensation. The Baron only received a small amount of compensation and finally gave up in the face of stiff government opposition.

He eventually gave the palace, its gardens and the estate to the Austrian government, on condition that a pension fund for former Rothschild employees be created with the proceeds, pegged to the pension scale for Austrian civil servants.

== Demolition ==
In 1954, the palace was torn down. Any items of value that were still left, such as chandeliers, woodwork and fireplaces, were sold off to the Dorotheum auction house at a minimal price, well below their actual value. The stairs and pillars of marble were sold to an Italian; the rest of the stone-work was simply destroyed, and the ornate iron fence and window grillwork were sold for scrap. The richly gilded stucco was ripped down: efforts to reclaim the gold-leaf proved uneconomic.

The large orchestrion was partly destroyed, though parts of it can be seen in the Collection of Ancient Musical Instruments of the Kunsthistorisches Museum. The smaller orchestrion was also lost. The building itself was made out of such sturdy materials and sound construction that dynamite had to be used to bring it down.
