= Sitzenberg Castle =

Austrian Castle

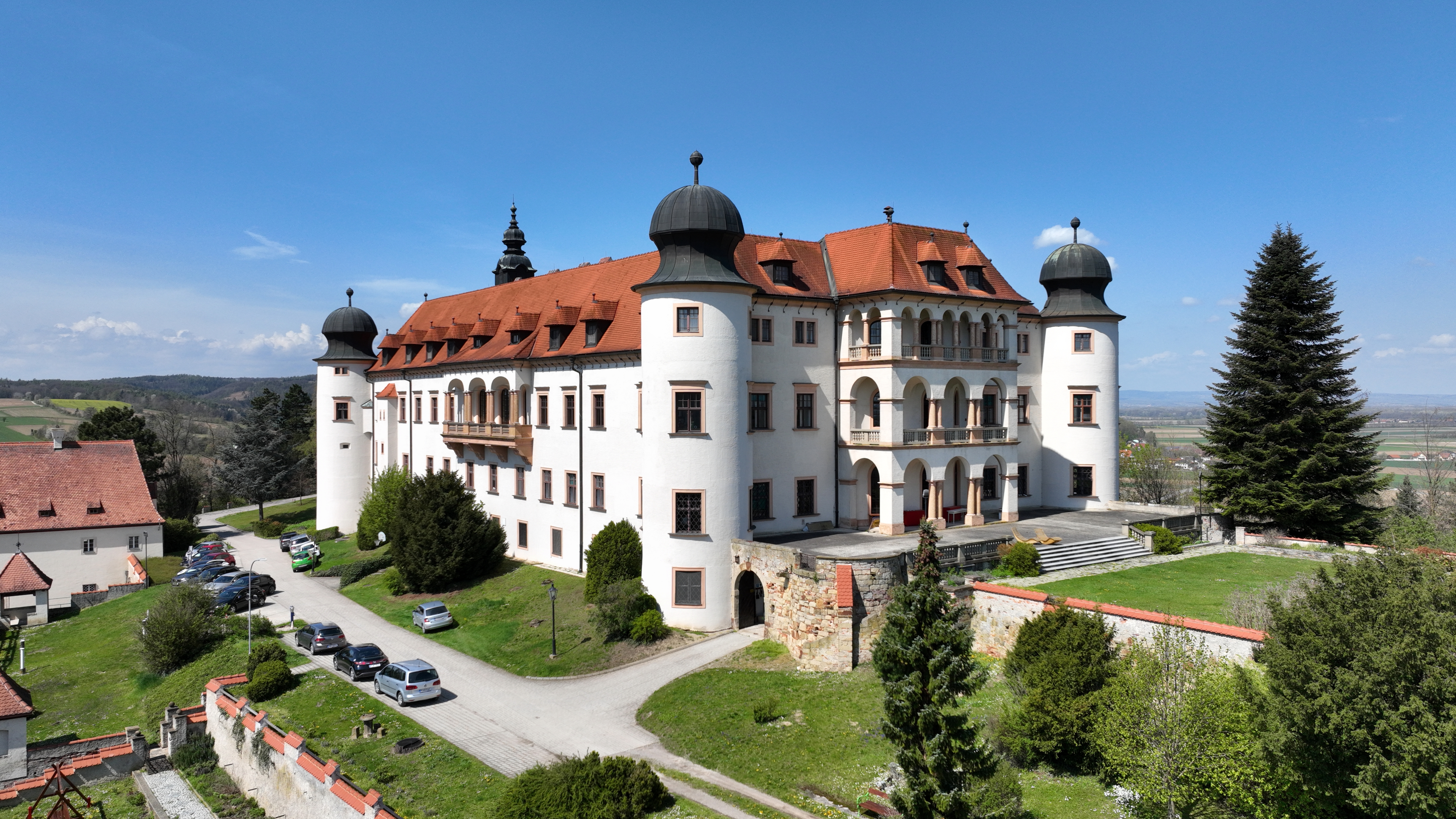
Sitzenberg Castle

Sitzenberg Castle (German: Schloss Sitzenberg) is a historic castle located in Sitzenberg in the municipality of Sitzenberg-Reidling in the district of Tulln in Lower Austria. The castle is used as the Sitzenberg Federal College for Agriculture and Food Economics.

== History ==
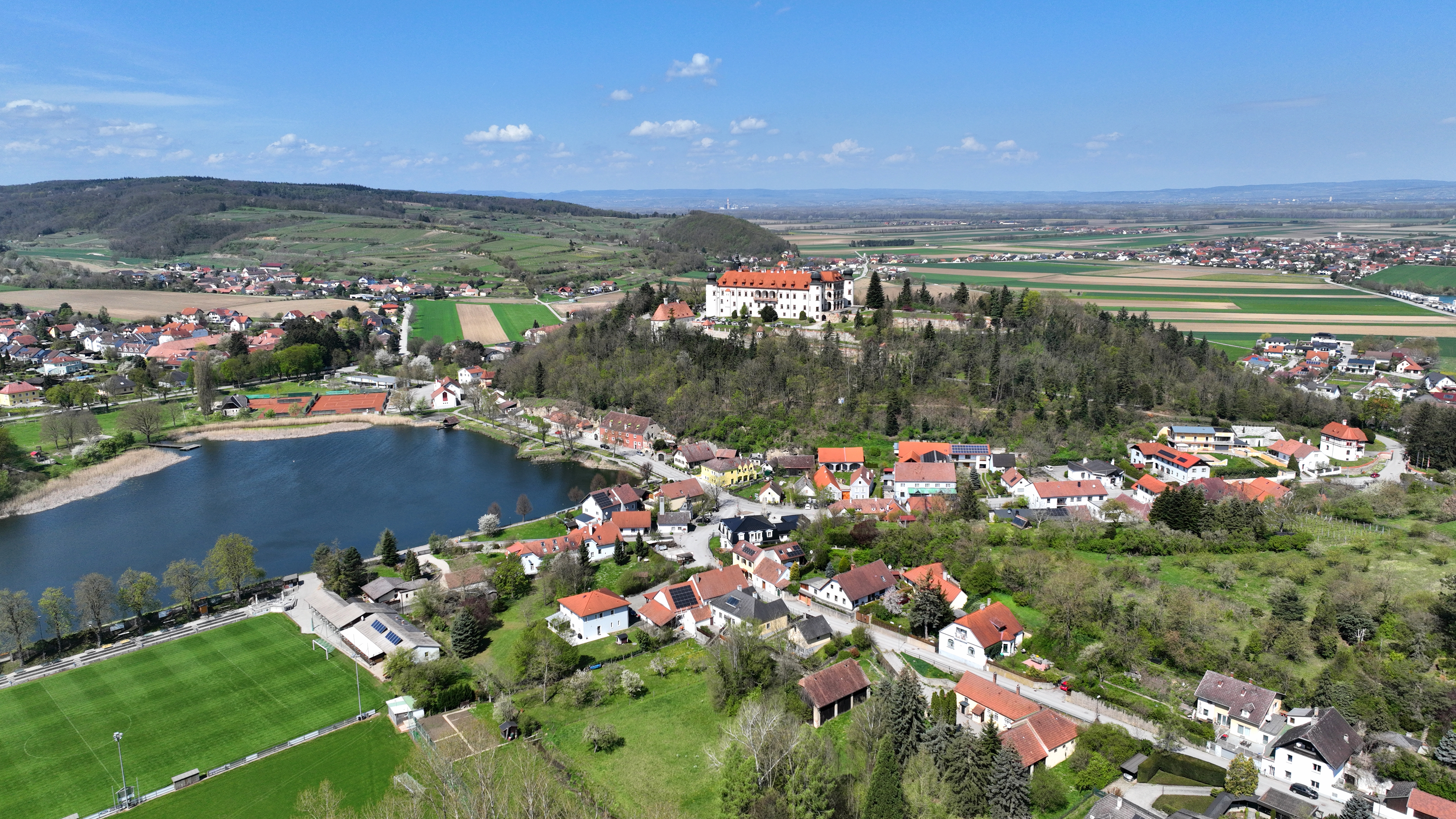
Aerial view of Sitzenberg

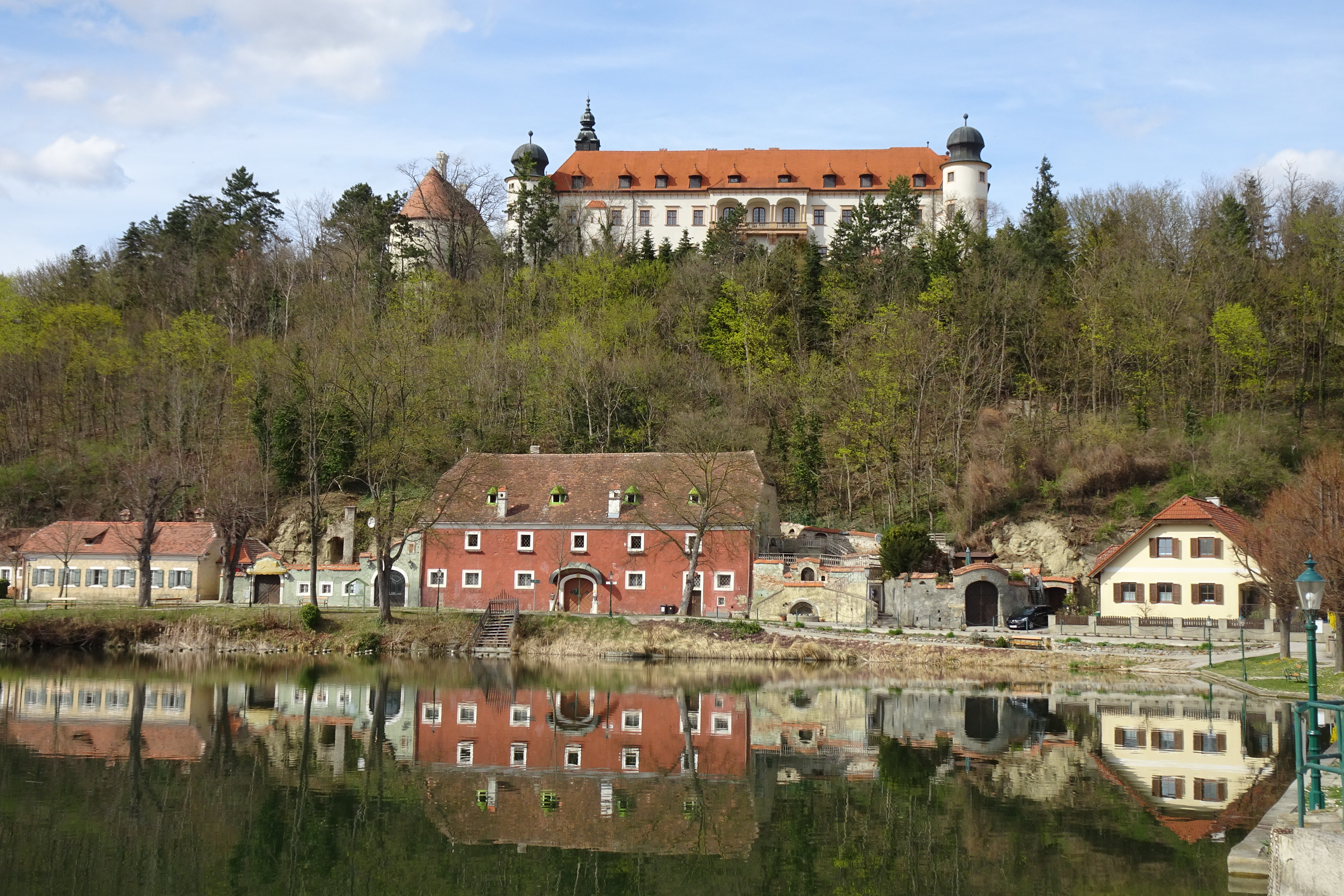
Sitzenberg Castle, the gatekeeper's house on the left, the Sitzenberg castle pond in the foreground

The castle is visible from afar on a wooded hilltop. The access road branches off from Schlossbergstrasse and, after a long curve, passes through the gatekeeper's house and ends after another curve in front of the western front.

The original castle was likely a two-story structure with several round towers and a high entrance and a fortified rampart in the east and a defensive wall with round towers in the south and east. In the second half of the 16th century, it was converted into a Renaissance castle under Christoph Greiss zu Wald. At the end of the 17th century, a clock tower was built in the northwest corner of the courtyard and around 1700 the central portal in the west wing was built. The east wing was demolished and rebuilt in 1821 due to a landslide.

From 1913 to 1921/1924, the building was converted into a closed four-wing complex in the Neo-Renaissance style according to the plans of Gustav von Flesch-Brunningen. The north and south wings were extended to the east, each with a round tower at the end. The new, spacious east wing was given a show facade and a generous interior design. The courtyard arcades rest on widely projecting corbels.

Minor renovations were carried out in 1950/1951 to create classrooms and rooms for boarding school accommodation.

== Gallery ==
=== Exterior gallery ===
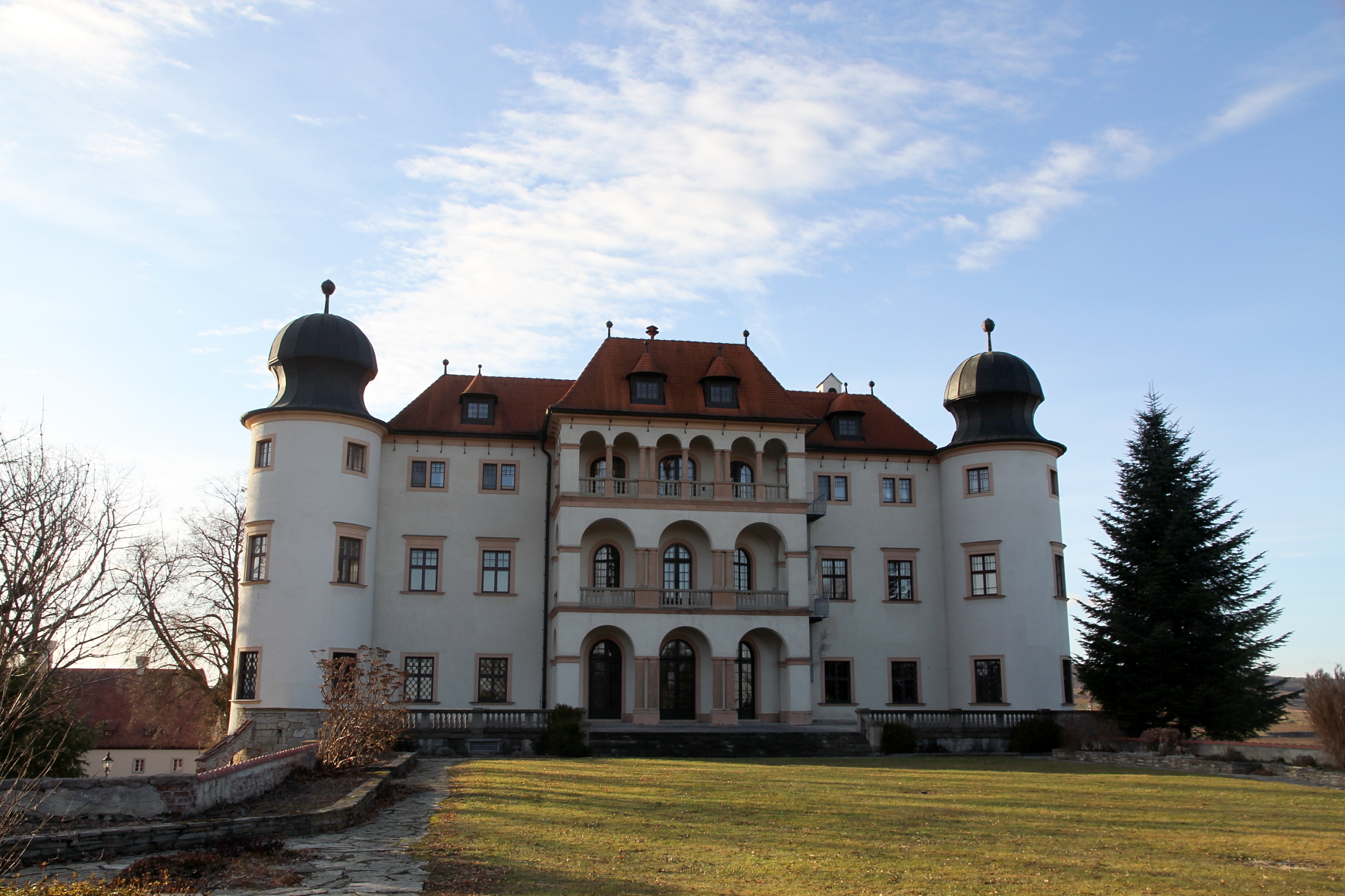
East view

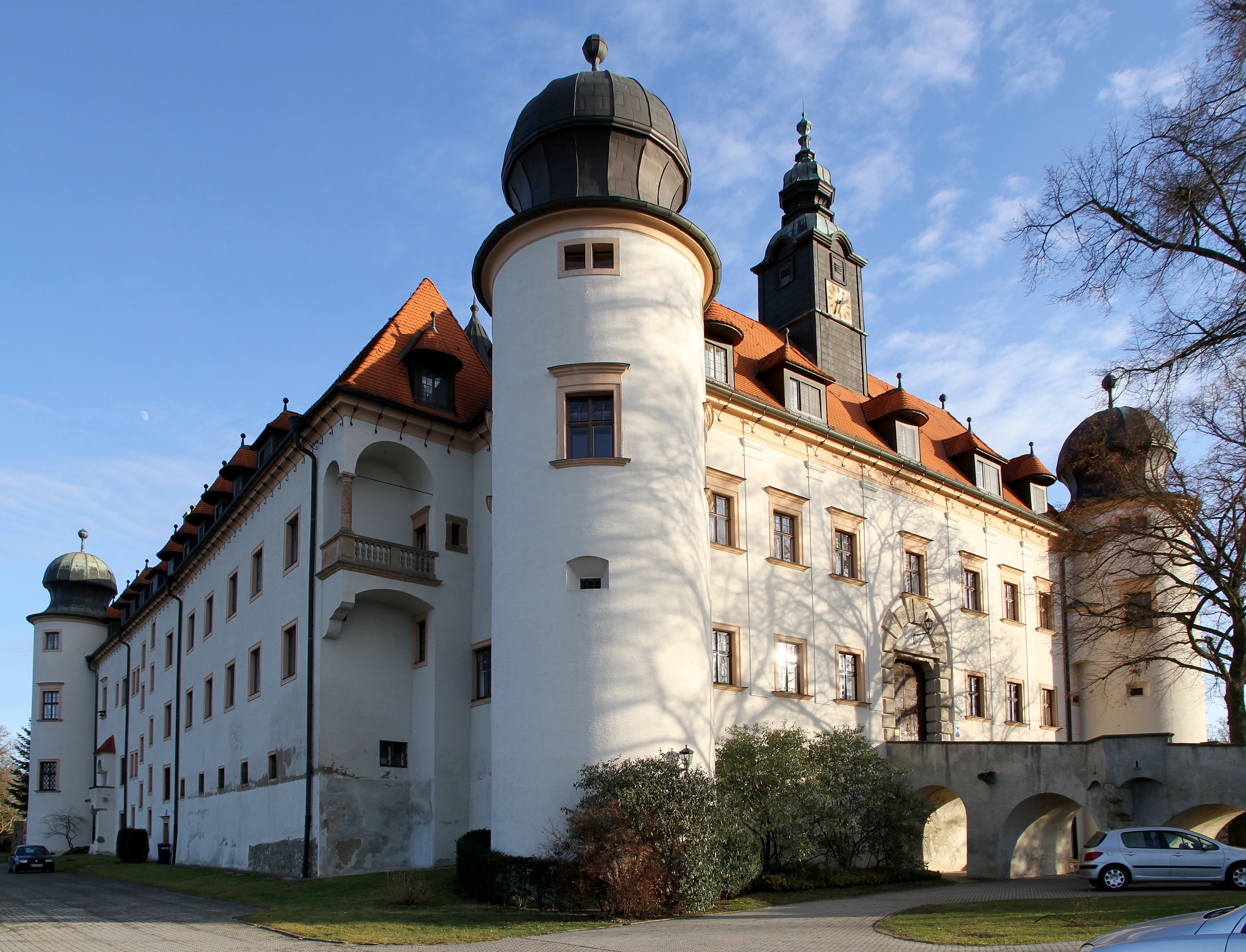
Northwest view

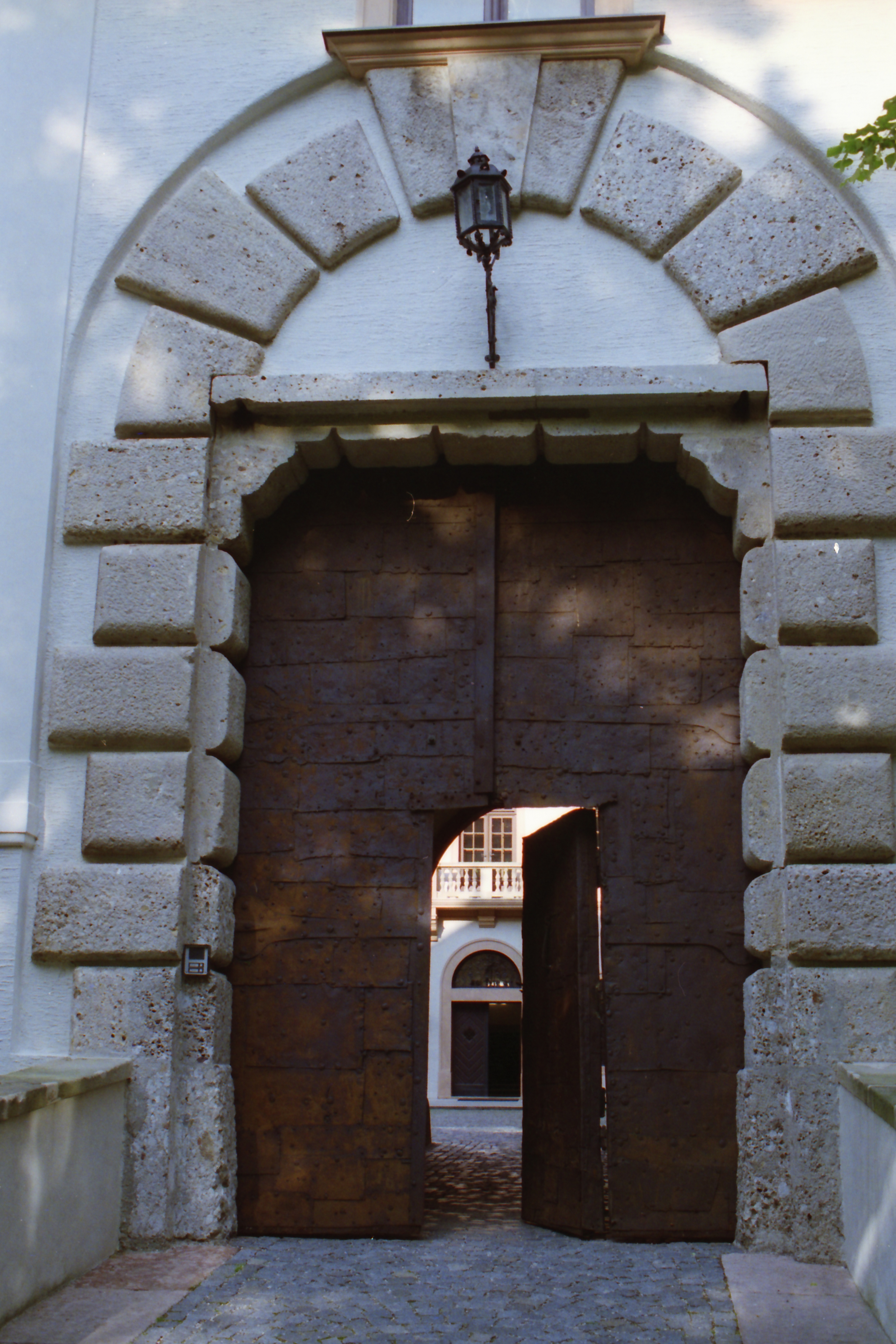
Entrance, 2022

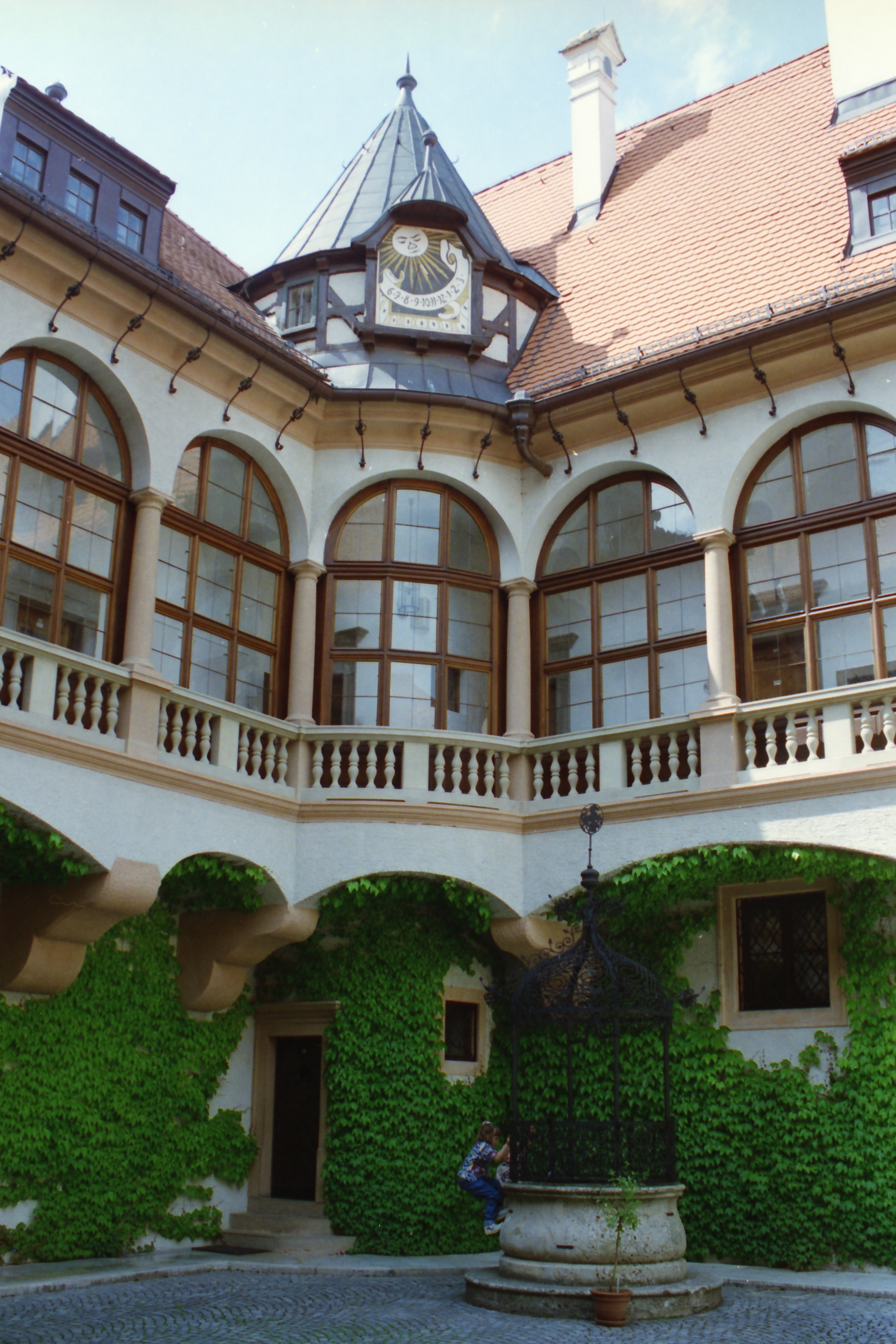
Courtyard, 2022

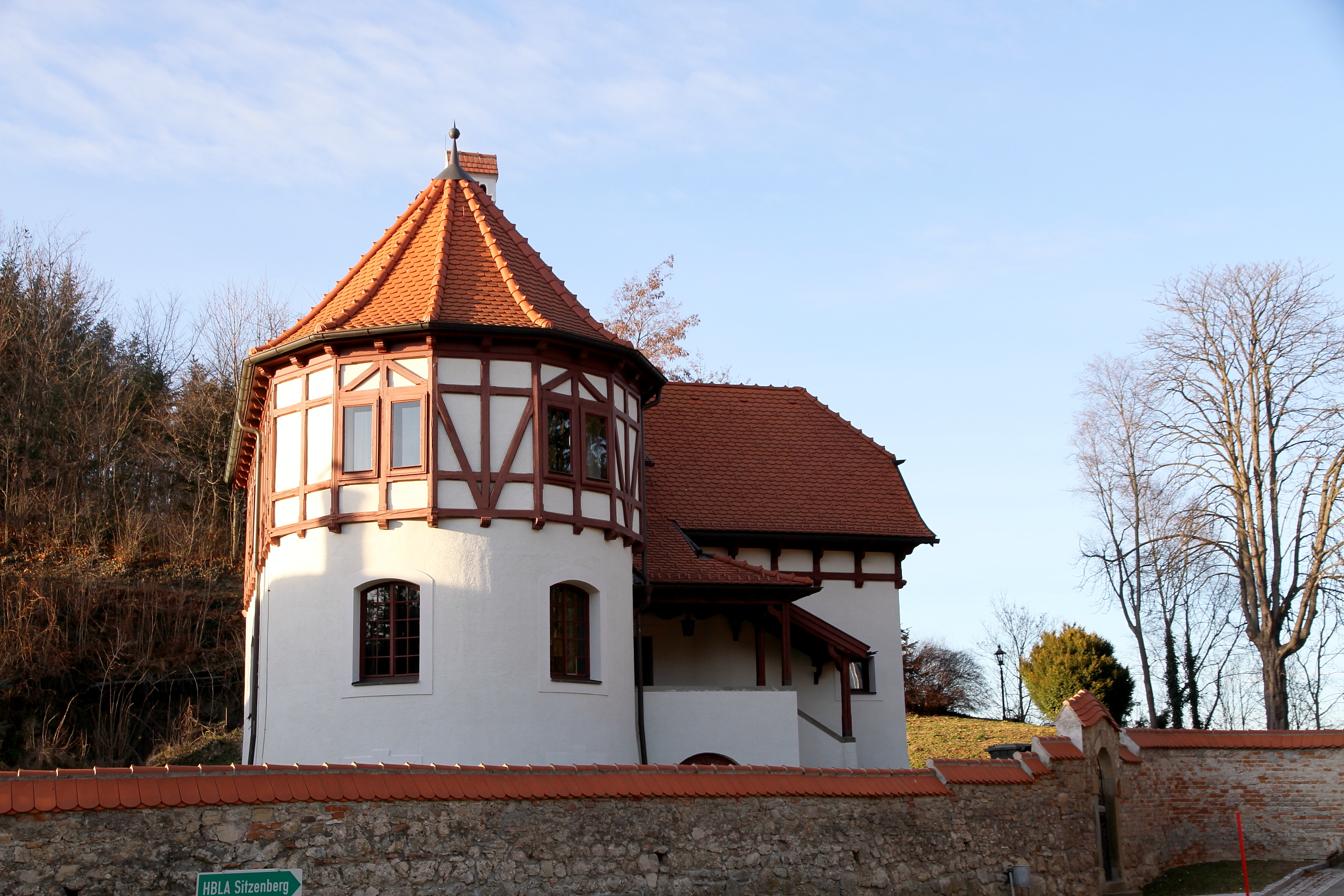
Gatekeeper's house

=== Interior gallery ===
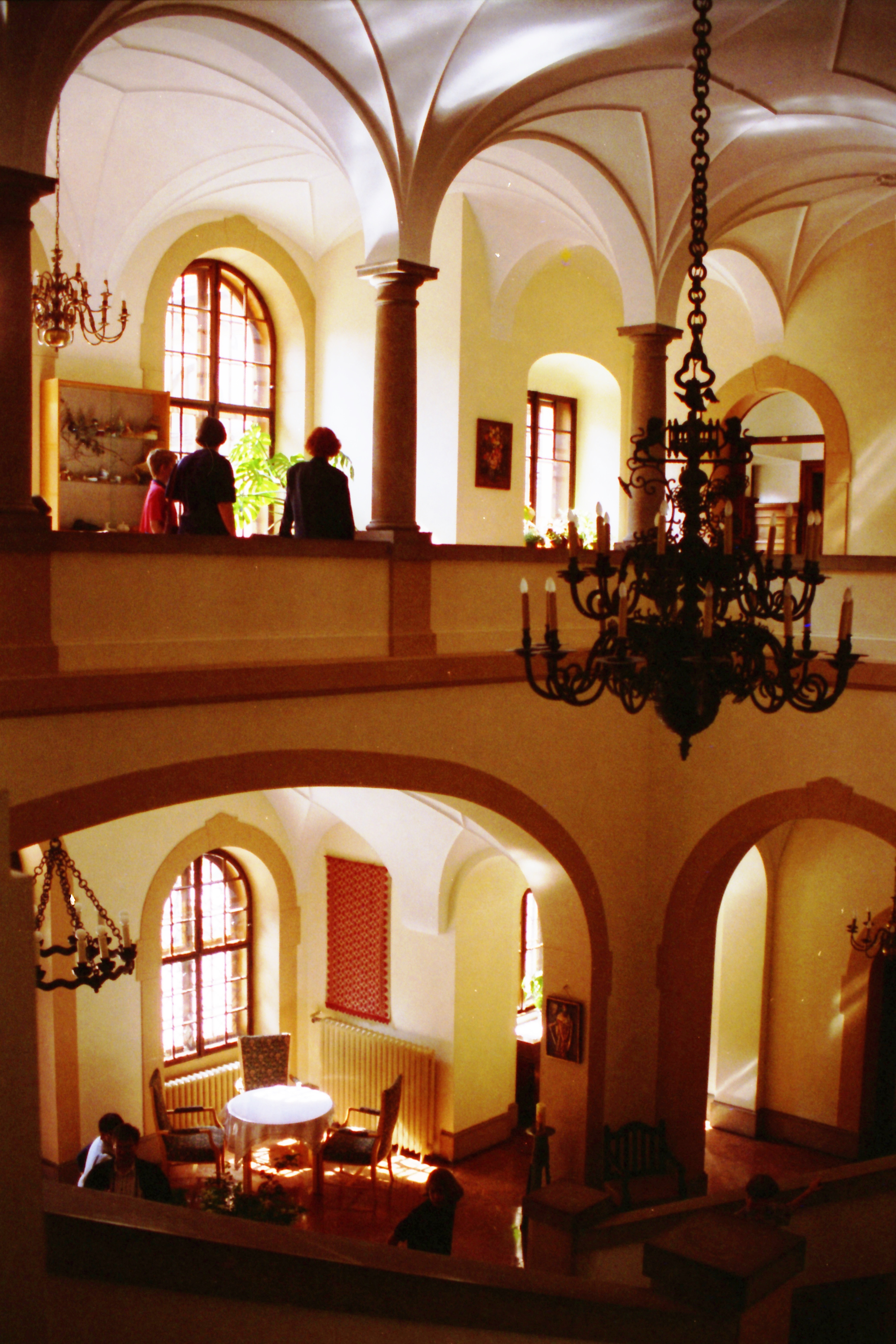
Interior, 2022

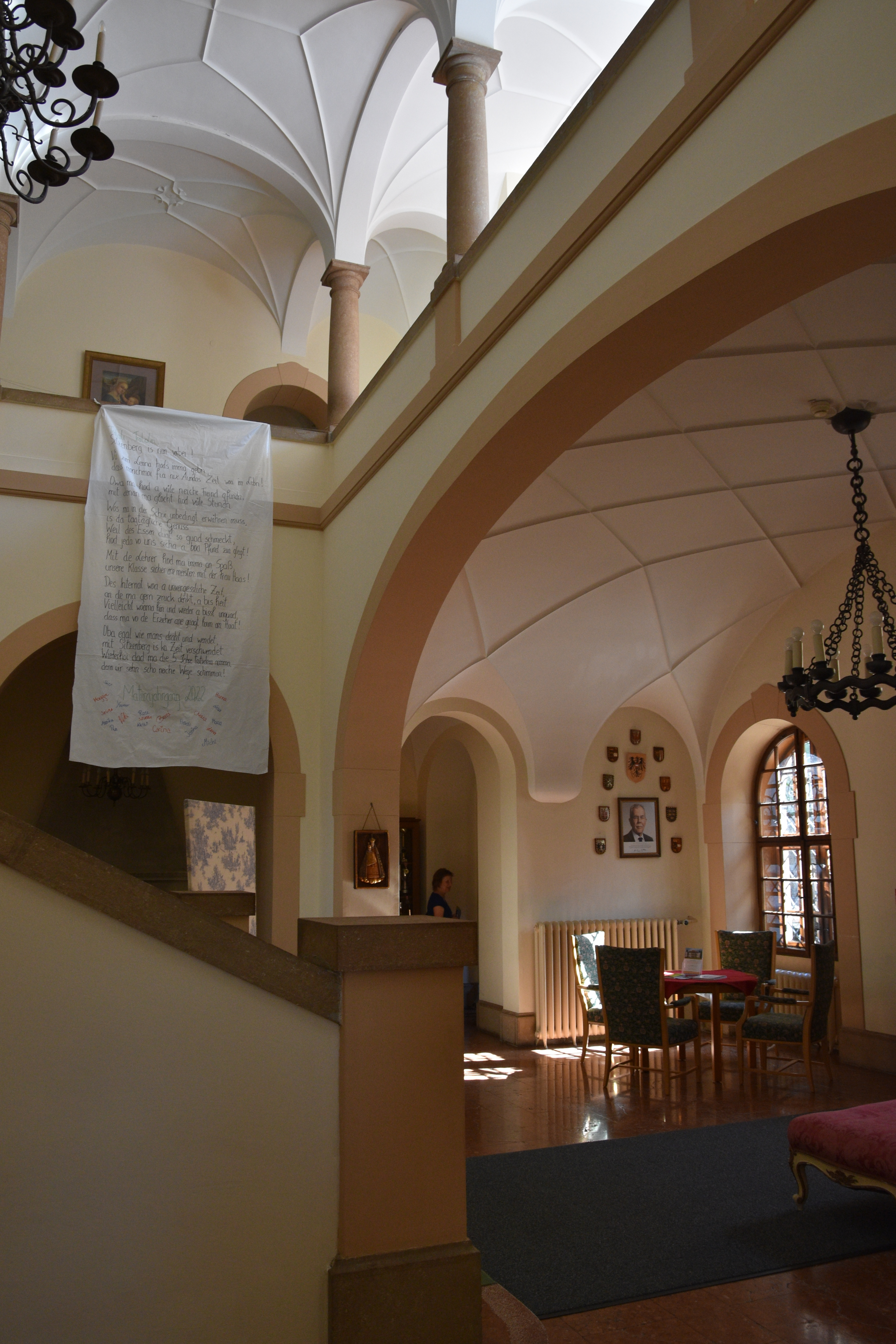
Interior, 2022

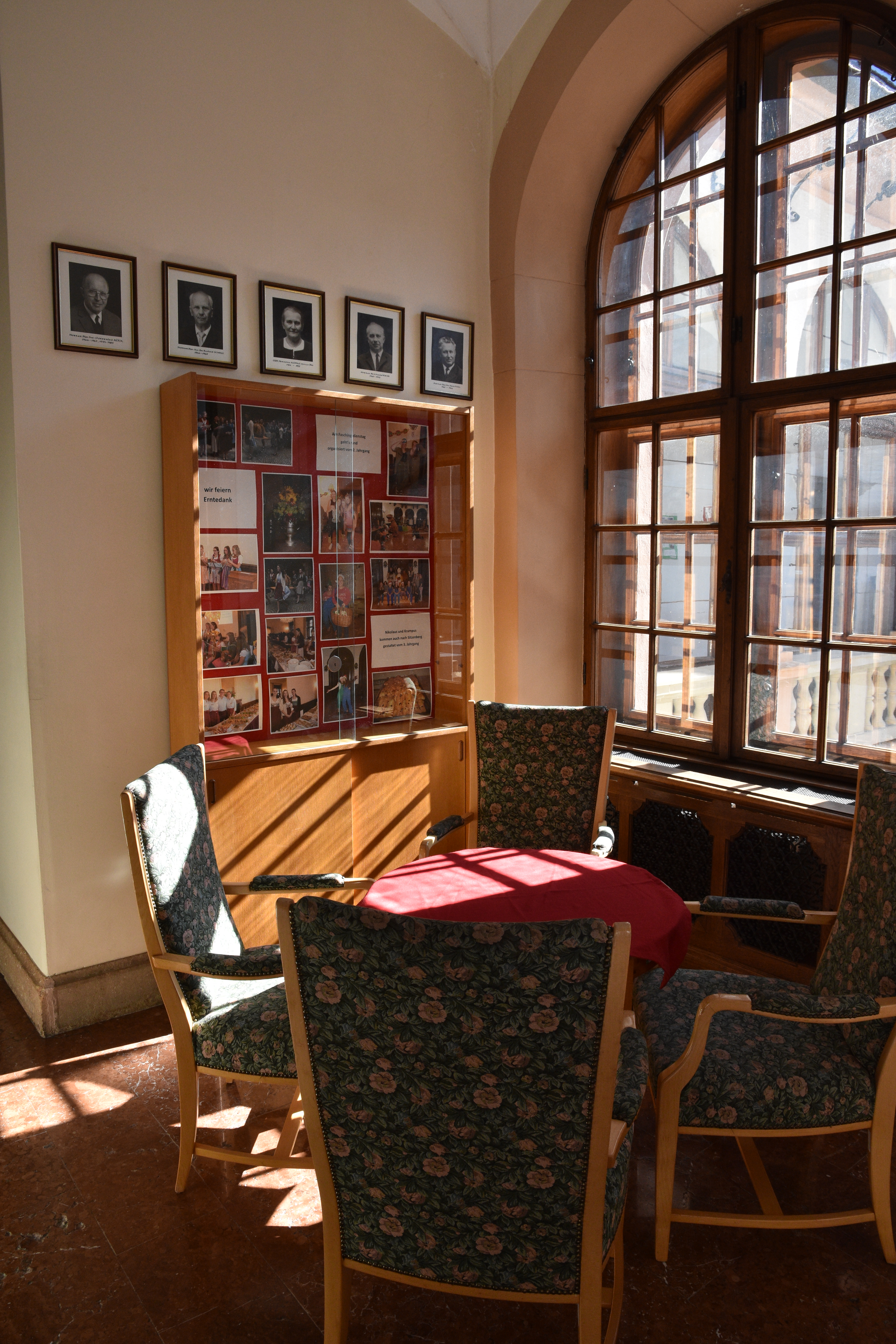
Interior, 2022

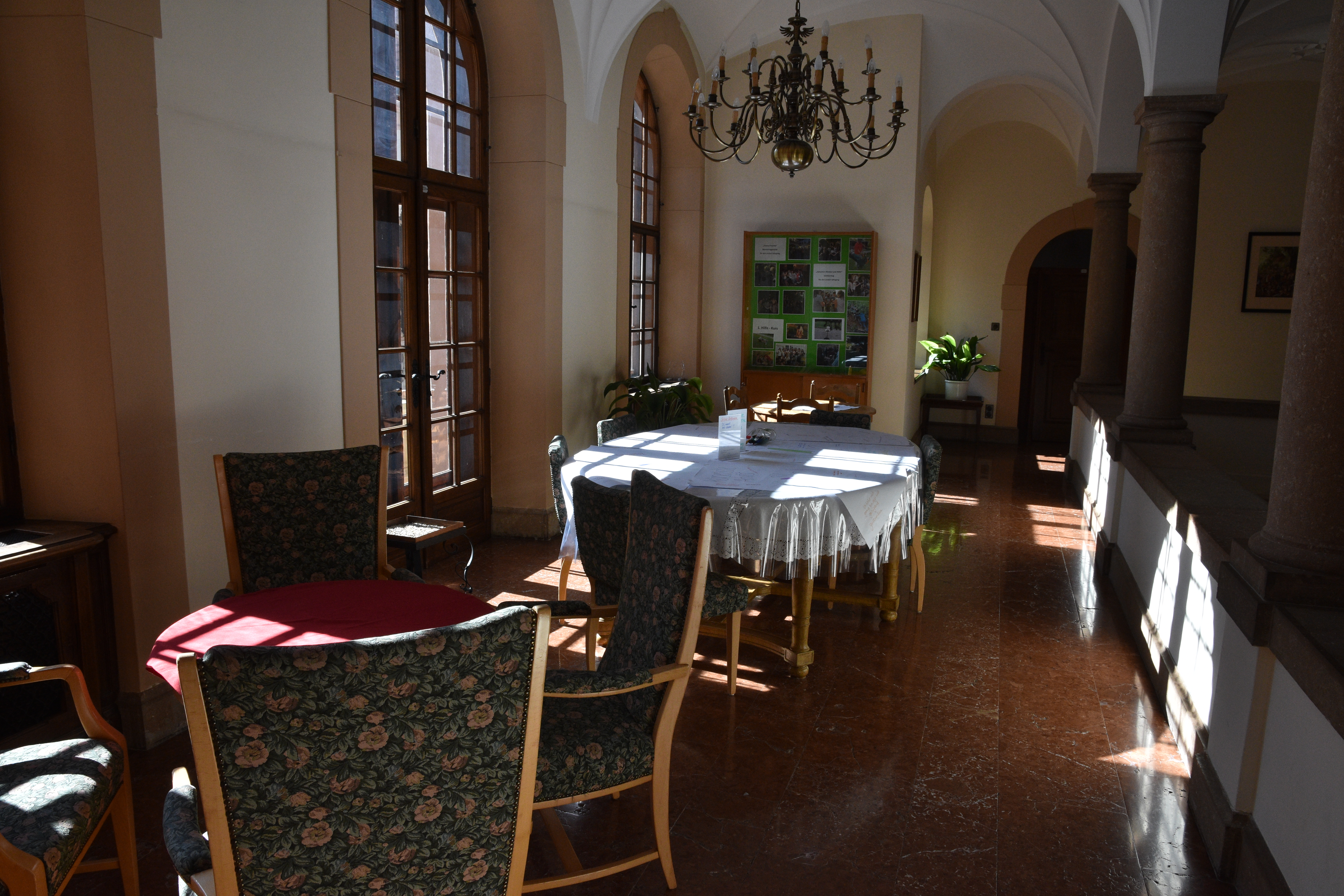
Interior, 2022

== See also ==
- Rothschild family
