= List of awards and nominations received by Elizabeth Taylor =

Elizabeth Taylor awards and nominations
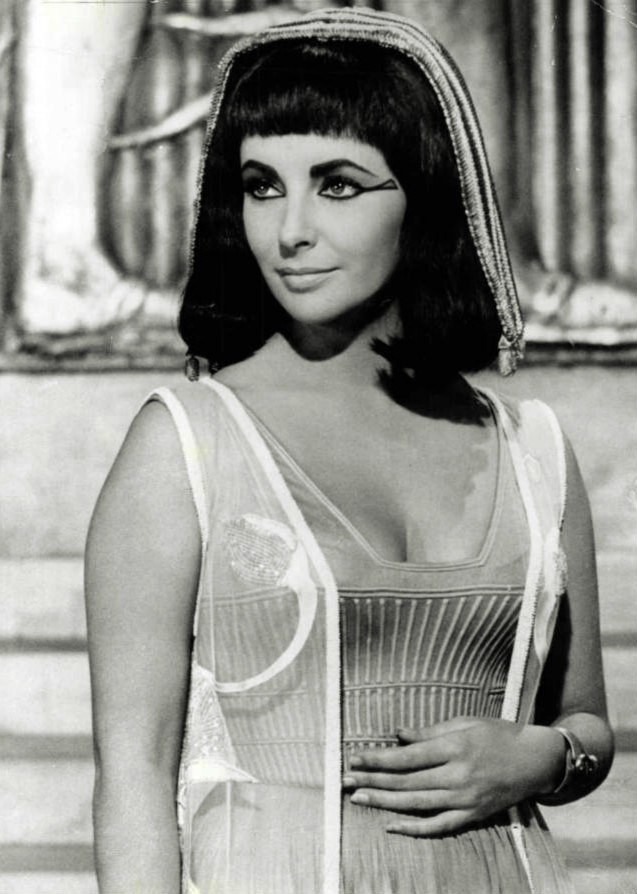
- Taylor as Cleopatra in Cleopatra (1963)
Awards and nominations
Award	Wins	Nominations
Golden Globe	1	4
Academy Awards	2	5
BAFTA Awards	1	3
Tony Awards	0	1

Totals (Note: Certain award groups do not simply award one winner. They acknowledge several different recipients, have runners-up, and have third place. Since this is a specific recognition and is different from losing an award, runner-up mentions are considered wins in this award tally. For simplification and to avoid errors, each award in this list has been presumed to have had a prior nomination.)
- Wins: 35
- Nominations: 49

Elizabeth Taylor was a British and American actress who received numerous accolades throughout her career and is considered to be one of the most popular stars of classical Hollywood cinema, with the American Film Institute naming her the seventh-greatest female screen legend in American film history.

In her six decades-long acting career, Taylor received five nominations for the Academy Award for Best Actress for the films Raintree County (1957), Cat on a Hot Tin Roof (1958), Suddenly, Last Summer (1959), BUtterfield 8 (1960), and Who's Afraid of Virginia Woolf? (1966), winning for these last two features. Her performance in Who's Afraid of Virginia Woolf? also earned her the BAFTA Award for Best British Actress, the National Board of Review Award for Best Actress, and the New York Film Critics Circle Award for Best Actress. Taylor was nominated for four Golden Globes, winning Best Actress in a Motion Picture – Drama for Suddenly, Last Summer in 1960. Her other acclaimed performances include Hammersmith Is Out (1972), which won her the Silver Bear for Best Actress at the Berlin International Film Festival, and The Taming of the Shrew (1967) and Zee and Co. (1972), for which she received two David di Donatello Awards for Best Foreign Actress. Taylor made her Broadway debut in a 1981 revival of the Lillian Hellman's play The Little Foxes, which earned her a nomination for the Tony Award for Best Actress in a Play and wins at the Outer Critics Circle Awards and the Theatre World Awards.

For her lifetime achievements, Taylor was honored with the AFI Life Achievement Award, the BAFTA Fellowship, the Cecil B. DeMille Award, the Screen Actors Guild Life Achievement Award, and a medallion at the Kennedy Center Honors. Her humanitarian commitment to the fight against HIV/AIDS was also recognized with several honors, including the Jean Hersholt Humanitarian Award at the Academy Awards, the GLAAD Vanguard Award, and the Presidential Citizens Medal.

== Awards and nominations ==
Awards and nominations received by Elizabeth Taylor
Award	Year (Note: Indicates the year of ceremony.)	Nominated work	Category	Result	Ref.
Academy Awards	1958	Raintree County	Best Actress	Nominated	
Academy Awards	1959	Cat on a Hot Tin Roof	Best Actress	Nominated	
Academy Awards	1960	Suddenly, Last Summer	Best Actress	Nominated	
Academy Awards	1961	BUtterfield 8	Best Actress	Won	
Academy Awards	1967	Who's Afraid of Virginia Woolf?	Best Actress	Won	
Berlin International Film Festival	1972	Hammersmith Is Out	Silver Bear for Best Actress	Won	
British Academy Film Awards	1959	Cat on a Hot Tin Roof	Best Foreign Actress	Nominated	
British Academy Film Awards	1967	Who's Afraid of Virginia Woolf?	Best British Actress	Won	
British Academy Film Awards	1968	The Taming of the Shrew	Best British Actress	Nominated	
David di Donatello	1967	The Taming of the Shrew	Best Foreign Actress	Won	
David di Donatello	1972	Zee and Co.	Best Foreign Actress	Won	
Drama Desk Awards	1981	The Little Foxes	Outstanding Actress in a Play	Nominated	
Golden Apple Awards	1985	—N/a	Female Star of the Year	Won	
Golden Globes	1960	Suddenly, Last Summer	Best Actress in a Motion Picture – Drama	Won	
Golden Globes	1961	BUtterfield 8	Best Actress in a Motion Picture – Drama	Nominated	
Golden Globes	1967	Who's Afraid of Virginia Woolf?	Best Actress in a Motion Picture – Drama	Nominated	
Golden Globes	1974	Ash Wednesday	Best Actress in a Motion Picture – Drama	Nominated	
Golden Raspberry Awards	1995	The Flintstones	Worst Supporting Actress	Nominated	
Kansas City Film Critics Circle	1966	Who's Afraid of Virginia Woolf?	Best Actress	Won	
National Board of Review	1967	Who's Afraid of Virginia Woolf?	Best Actress	Won	
National Society of Film Critics	1967	Who's Afraid of Virginia Woolf?	Best Actress	Nominated	
New York Film Critics Circle	1958	Cat on a Hot Tin Roof	Best Actress	Nominated	
New York Film Critics Circle	1959	Suddenly, Last Summer	Best Actress	Nominated	
New York Film Critics Circle	1967	Who's Afraid of Virginia Woolf?	Best Actress	Won (Note: tied with Lynn Redgrave for Georgy Girl)	
Outer Critics Circle Awards	1981	The Little Foxes	Outstanding Debut Performance	Won	
Theatre World Awards	1981	The Little Foxes	Best Debut Performance	Won	
Tony Awards	1981	The Little Foxes	Best Actress in a Play	Nominated	

=== Honorary awards ===
Awards and nominations received by Elizabeth Taylor
Organization	Year (Note: Indicates the year of ceremony.)	Category	Result	Ref.
Academy Awards	1993	Jean Hersholt Humanitarian Award	Honored	
Actor Awards	1998	Screen Actors Guild Life Achievement Award	Honored	
Alliance of Women Film Journalists	2012	Humanitarian Activism Award	Honored	
American Academy of Achievement	1985	Golden Plate Award	Honored	
American Film Institute	1993	AFI Life Achievement Award	Honored	
Britannia Awards	2005	Artistic Excellence in International Entertainment	Honored	
British Academy Film Awards	1999	BAFTA Fellowship	Honored	
British Film Institute	2000	BFI Fellowship	Honored	
Cairo International Film Festival	1979	Career Achievement Award	Honored	
David di Donatello	1960	Golden Plate	Honored	
Film at Lincoln Center	1986	Gala Tribute	Honored	
GLAAD Media Awards	2000	Vanguard Award	Honored	
Golden Globes	1957	Special Achievement	Honored	
Golden Globes	1974	World Film Favorite – Female	Honored	
Golden Globes	1985	Cecil B. DeMille Award	Honored	
Hasty Pudding Theatricals	1977	Woman of the Year	Honored	
Kennedy Center Honors	2002	Honoree	Honored	
Presidential Citizens Medal	2001	Honoree	Honored	
Taos Talking Pictures Film Festival	2001	Maverick Award	Honored	
Women Film Critics Circle	2011	Acting and Activism	Honored	
Women in Film Crystal + Lucy Awards	1985	Crystal Award	Honored	
Women in Film Crystal + Lucy Awards	2011	Humanitarian Award	Honored	
