= Elizabeth Taylor filmography =

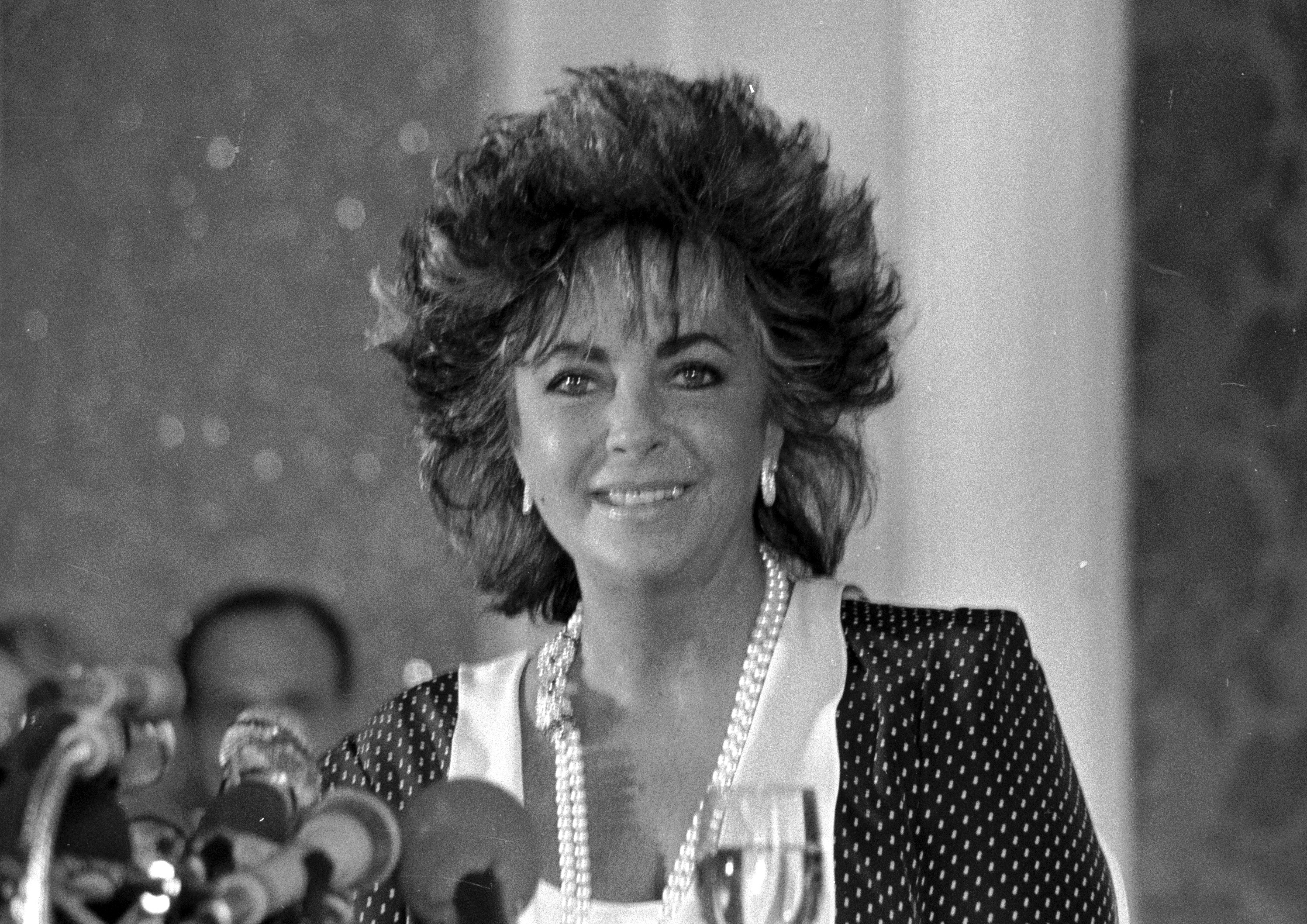
Taylor at the 1985 Deauville American Film Festival in Normandy, France.

Elizabeth Taylor appeared in numerous movies and television shows from 1942 through 2001.

== Feature films ==
Year	Title	Role	Notes
1942	There's One Born Every Minute	Gloria Twine	aka Man or Mouse
1943	Lassie Come Home	Priscilla	
1943	Jane Eyre	Helen Burns	Uncredited
1944	The White Cliffs of Dover	Betsy Kenney at age 10	Uncredited
1944	National Velvet	Velvet Brown	
1946	Courage of Lassie	Katherine Eleanor Merrick	
1947	Life with Father	Mary Skinner	With William Powell and Irene Dunne
1947	Cynthia	Cynthia Bishop	aka The Rich Full Life
1948	A Date with Judy	Carol Pringle	
1948	Julia Misbehaves	Susan Packett	
1949	Little Women	Amy March	
1949	Conspirator	Melinda Greyton	
1950	Father of the Bride	Katherine "Kay" Banks	
1950	The Big Hangover	Mary Beaney	
1951	Father's Little Dividend	Kay Dunstan	
1951	A Place in the Sun	Angela Vickers	
1951	Quo Vadis	Christian Prisoner in Arena	Uncredited
1951	Callaway Went Thataway	Herself	aka The Star Said No; Uncredited; Cameo appearance
1952	Love Is Better Than Ever	Anastacia "Stacie" Macaboy	
1952	Ivanhoe	Rebecca	
1953	The Girl Who Had Everything	Jean Latimer	
1954	Rhapsody	Louise Durant	
1954	Elephant Walk	Ruth Wiley	
1954	Beau Brummell	Lady Patricia Belham	
1954	The Last Time I Saw Paris	Helen Ellswirth / Willis	
1956	Giant	Leslie Lynnton Benedict	Golden Globe Award for Special Achievement
1957	Raintree County	Susanna Drake	Laurel Award for Top Female Dramatic Performance; Nominated – Academy Award for Best Actress
1958	Cat on a Hot Tin Roof	Maggie "The Cat" Pollit	Laurel Award for Top Female Dramatic Performance; Nominated – Academy Award for Best Actress; Nominated – BAFTA Award for Best Actress in a Leading Role
1959	Suddenly, Last Summer	Catherine Holly	David di Donatello Golden Plate Award; Golden Globe Award for Best Actress – Motion Picture Drama; Laurel Award for Top Female Dramatic Performance; Nominated – Academy Award for Best Actress; Nominated – Bambi Award for Best International Actress
1960	Scent of Mystery	The Woman of Mystery	aka Holiday in Spain; Uncredited; Cameo appearance
1960	BUtterfield 8	Gloria Wandrous	Academy Award for Best Actress; Laurel Award for Top Female Dramatic Performance (2nd place); Nominated – Golden Globe Award for Best Actress – Motion Picture Drama; Nominated – Bambi Award for Best International Actress
1963	Cleopatra	Cleopatra	
1963	The V.I.P.s	Frances Andros	aka Hotel International
1965	The Sandpiper	Laura Reynolds	Laurel Award for Top Female Dramatic Performance (3rd place)
1966	Who's Afraid of Virginia Woolf?	Martha	Academy Award for Best Actress; BAFTA Award for Best Actress in a Leading Role; Bambi Award for Best International Actress; Kansas City Film Critics Circle Award for Best Actress; Laurel Award for Top Female Dramatic Performance; National Board of Review Award for Best Actress; New York Film Critics Circle Award for Best Actress (tied with Lynn Redgrave for Georgy Girl); Nominated – Golden Globe Award for Best Actress – Motion Picture Drama
1967	The Taming of the Shrew	Katharina Minola	Also producer (uncredited); David di Donatello Award for Best Foreign Actress (tied with Julie Christie for Doctor Zhivago); Nominated – BAFTA Award for Best Actress in a Leading Role
1967	Reflections in a Golden Eye	Leonora Penderton	
1967	Doctor Faustus	Helen of Troy	
1967	The Comedians	Martha Pineda	
1968	Boom!	Flora "Sissy" Goforth	
1968	Secret Ceremony	Leonora	
1969	Anne of the Thousand Days	Masked Lady at Court	Uncredited
1970	The Only Game in Town	Fran Walker	
1971	Under Milk Wood	Rosie Probert	
1972	X Y & Zee	Zee Blakely	aka Zee and Co.; David di Donatello Award for Best Foreign Actress
1972	Hammersmith Is Out	Jimmie Jean Jackson	Silver Bear for Best Actress
1973	Night Watch	Ellen Wheeler	
1973	Ash Wednesday	Barbara Sawyer	Nominated – Golden Globe Award for Best Actress – Motion Picture Drama
1974	Identikit	Lise	aka The Driver's Seat
1974	That's Entertainment!	Herself (co-host)	
1976	The Blue Bird	Queen of Light / Mother Witch / Maternal Love	
1977	A Little Night Music	Desiree Armfeldt	
1979	Winter Kills	Lola Comante	Uncredited; Cameo appearance
1980	The Mirror Crack'd	Marina Rudd	
1988	Young Toscanini	Nadina Bulichoff	
1994	The Flintstones	Pearl Slaghoople	Nominated – Razzie Award for Worst Supporting Actress; final theatrical film

=== Box Office Ranking ===
- 1957 - 20th
- 1958 - 2nd
- 1959 - 11th
- 1960 - 4th (5th in UK)
- 1961 - 1st (4th in UK)
- 1962 - 6th
- 1963 - 6th (6th in UK)
- 1964 - 11th
- 1965 - 9th
- 1966 - 3rd
- 1967 - 6th
- 1968 - 10th
- 1969 - 17th
- 1970 - 24th

== Television ==
Year	Title	Role	Notes
1957	Around the World in 90 Minutes	Host, cake-cutter	Live television special attended by 18,000 people at Madison Square Garden
1963	Elizabeth Taylor in London	Herself	Television special
1968	Around the World of Mike Todd	Herself	Television documentary
1970	Here's Lucy	Herself	Episode: “Lucy Meets The Burtons”
1973	Divorce His, Divorce Hers	Jane Reynolds	Television film
1976	Victory at Entebbe	Edra Vilonfsky	Television film
1978	Hallmark Hall of Fame	Dr. Emily Loomis	Episode: "Return Engagement"
1981	General Hospital	Helena Cassadine	Episode: 16 November 1981; Episode: 17 November 1981; Episode: 19 November 1981
1983	Between Friends	Deborah Shapiro	Television film
1984	Hotel	Katherine Cole	Episode: "Intimate Strangers"
1985	Malice in Wonderland	Louella Parsons	Television film
1985	North and South	Madame Conti	Television miniseries (6 episodes)
1986	There Must Be a Pony	Marguerite Sydney	Television film
1987	Poker Alice	Alice Moffit	Television film
1989	Sweet Bird of Youth	Princess Kosmonopolis	Television film
1992	Captain Planet and the Planeteers	Mrs. Andrews (voice)	Episode: "A Formula for Hate"
1992–1993	The Simpsons	Maggie Simpson (voice) Herself (voice)	Episode: "Lisa's First Word" Episode: "Krusty Gets Kancelled"
1996	Murphy Brown	Herself	Episode: "Trick or Retreat"
1996	The Nanny	Herself	Episode: "Where's the Pearls?"
1996	Can't Hurry Love	Herself	Episode: "The Elizabeth Taylor Episode"
2001	God, the Devil, and Bob	Sarah (voice)	Episode: "God's Girlfriend"
2001	These Old Broads	Beryl Mason	Television film (final film role)

== Other appearances ==
Other appearances have included: Interviews with David Frost, Barbara Walters, Phil Donahue, and Larry King; various profiles of Michael Jackson; The Freddie Mercury Tribute Concert; and Elizabeth Taylor: England's Other Elizabeth in 2000.

Her General Hospital cameo appearance coincided with the wedding of Luke and Laura.
