= Larry Fortensky =

American construction worker (1952–2016)

- Born: Lawrence Lee Fortensky; January 17, 1952; Stockton, California, U.S.
- Died: July 7, 2016 (aged 64); Fontana, California, U.S.
- Occupation: Construction worker
- Spouses: Priscilla Torres (m. 1972; div. 1974) Karin McNeal (m. 1978; div. 1984) Elizabeth Taylor (m. 1991; div. 1996)
- Children: 1
- Military career
- Allegiance: United States of America
- Branch: United States Army
- Service years: 1972
- Conflicts: Vietnam War

Lawrence Lee Fortensky (January 17, 1952 – July 7, 2016) was an American construction worker. He was known for being the last husband of actress Elizabeth Taylor. They were married in 1991 at Michael Jackson's Neverland Ranch and divorced five years later.

== Early life ==
Fortensky, the eldest of seven children, was born in Stockton, California, on January 17, 1952, and moved downstate to Stanton in 1960. He dropped out of Pacifica High School in nearby Garden Grove during 10th grade. He was drafted into the U.S. Army in 1972 and discharged three months later.

Fortensky married the former Priscilla Joan Torres in 1972. They had a daughter, Julie, and divorced in 1974. In 1978, he married lab technician Karin McNeal and they divorced in 1984.

== Substance addiction and marriage to Elizabeth Taylor ==
In 1987, he was convicted for driving while intoxicated. Police found him in a San Clemente, California, parking lot "very intoxicated" and in possession of marijuana. Using Teamster medical insurance from his construction job, he checked himself into the Betty Ford Center in 1988, where he met Elizabeth Taylor. He was living in a small house in Stanton.

Taylor and Fortensky were married on October 6, 1991, at Michael Jackson's Neverland Ranch. The wedding, which cost between $1.5 and $2 million, was attended by 160 guests and presided over by Marianne Williamson. It was a high-profile event with paparazzi helicopters buzzing overhead and a guest list that included Liza Minnelli, Eddie Murphy, and Nancy Reagan, as well as Franco Zeffirelli, Arsenio Hall, Pia Zadora, George Hamilton, Merv Griffin, Quincy Jones, and Macaulay Culkin. Taylor's $25,000 dress was a gift from Valentino. She was escorted by Michael Jackson and her eldest son Michael Wilding Jr. They were toasted with mineral water. Fortensky's best man was Taylor's hairdresser José Eber. Fortensky's family arrived in their own cars rather than limousines. The couple donated money to AIDS charities from the sale of wedding photos. Despite marrying the wealthy Taylor, he reportedly kept his job and would get up at 5 AM and report for work at construction sites.

In August 1996, Fortensky was arrested for drug use after police in Hemet, California, found him in an illegally parked luxury motor home with no license plates, with a woman he identified as his live-in maid. Fortensky, whose black BMW was parked by the home's front door, refused to allow police to search the motor home, but he was arrested for being under the influence of drugs.

Fortensky was reported to have a prenuptial agreement in which he would receive $1 million (with no additional support) if the marriage lasted five years. The couple separated after five years in 1996, with Fortensky hiring New York divorce attorney Raoul Felder. The couple divorced on October 31, 1996.

== Post-divorce ==
Fortensky fell down a flight of stairs at his home in San Juan Capistrano, California, on January 28, 1999, and was hospitalized for two months during which he was in a coma for six weeks. He suffered short-term memory loss as a result of the fall. He was reported to have been drunk at the time, mourning the death of a prized pet.

He bought a three-bedroom house in Temecula, California, in 2002 with money from the divorce settlement. In 2009, Taylor reportedly gave him $50,000 to pay the $5,800 monthly mortgage payment and keep the house out of foreclosure.

Fortensky's last phone call with Taylor was a day before she entered the hospital in February 2011. She died in March 2011 and left Fortensky $825,000 in her will.

== Death ==
Fortensky died from skin cancer surgery complications on July 7, 2016, after 65 days in a coma.

Husband of Elizabeth Taylor
Preceded by John Warner	Husband of Elizabeth Taylor (by order of marriage); 1991-1996	Succeeded by Last
