= Elizabeth Taylor =

British and American actress (1932–2011)

Dame Elizabeth Taylor DBE
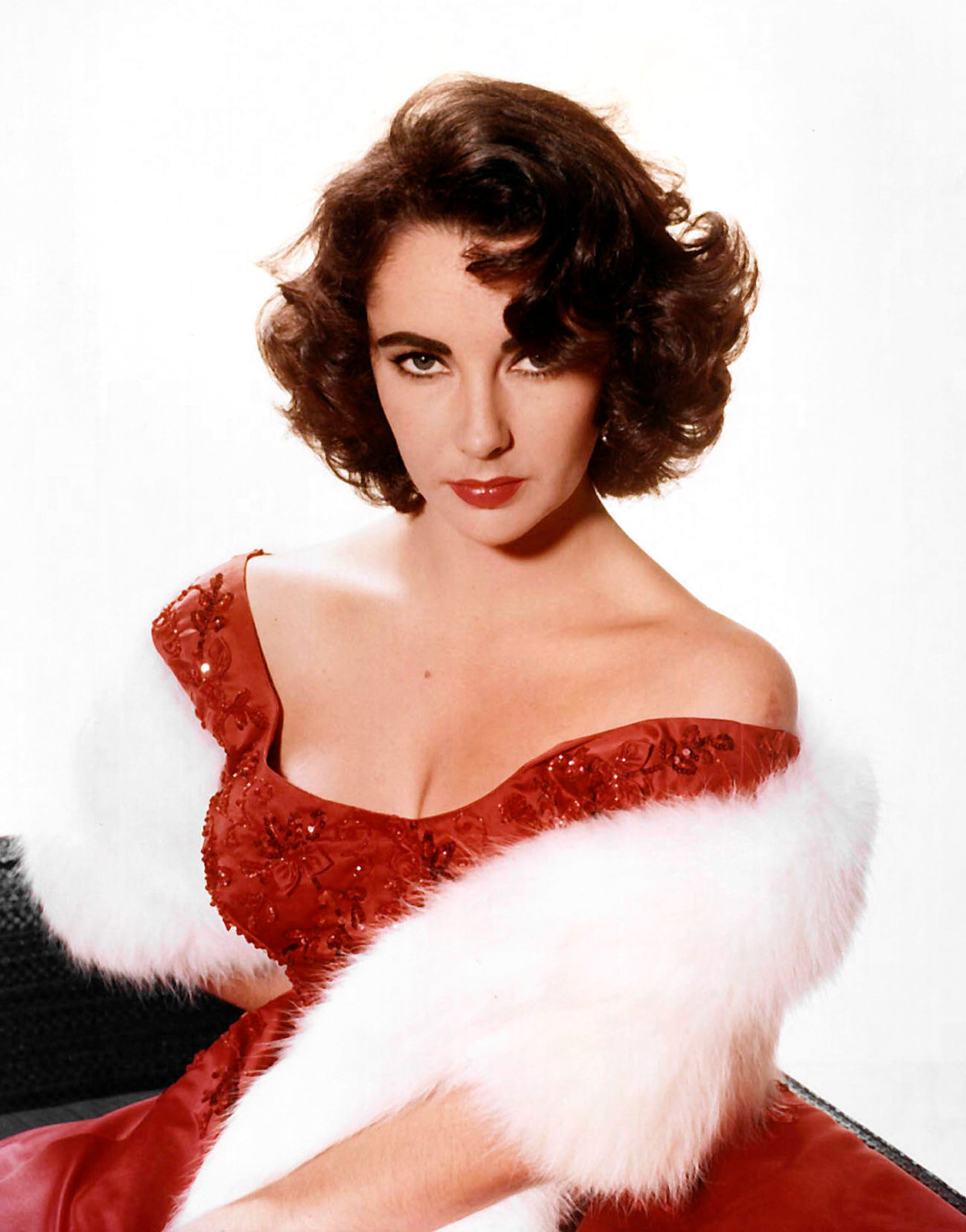
- Taylor c. 1955
- Born: Elizabeth Rosemond Taylor; February 27, 1932; London, England
- Died: March 23, 2011 (aged 79); Los Angeles, California, U.S.
- Resting place: Forest Lawn Memorial Park
- Citizenship: United Kingdom; United States
- Occupations: Actress; activist
- Years active: 1941–2007
- Works: Full list
- Spouses: Conrad Hilton Jr. (m. 1950; div. 1951); Michael Wilding (m. 1952; div. 1957); Mike Todd (m. 1957; died 1958); Eddie Fisher (m. 1959; div. 1964); Richard Burton (m. 1964; div. 1974) (m. 1975; div. 1976); John Warner (m. 1976; div. 1982); Larry Fortensky (m. 1991; div. 1996)
- Children: 4
- Parents: Sara Sothern; Francis Lenn Taylor
- Awards: Full list
- Website: elizabethtaylor.com

Dame Elizabeth Rosemond Taylor (February 27, 1932 – March 23, 2011) was a British and American actress. She began her career as a child actress in the early 1940s and was one of the most popular stars of classical Hollywood cinema in the 1950s. She then became the world's highest-paid movie star in the 1960s, remaining a well-known public figure for the rest of her life. In 1999, the American Film Institute ranked her seventh on its list of the greatest female screen legends.

Born in London to socially prominent American parents, Taylor moved with her family to Los Angeles in 1939 at the age of seven. She made her acting debut with a minor role in the Universal Pictures film There's One Born Every Minute (1942), but the studio ended her contract after a year. She was then signed by MGM and became a popular teen star after appearing in National Velvet (1944). She transitioned to mature roles in the 1950s, starring in the comedy Father of the Bride (1950) and receiving critical acclaim for her performance in the drama A Place in the Sun (1951). One of MGM's most bankable stars, she starred in the historical adventure epic Ivanhoe (1952) with Robert Taylor and Joan Fontaine. Taylor resented the studio's control and many casting choices.

Taylor wished to end her career in the early 1950s but began receiving more enjoyable roles. The epic drama Giant (1956) followed. She also starred in several critically and commercially successful films in the following years. These included two film adaptations of plays by Tennessee Williams: Cat on a Hot Tin Roof (1958) and Suddenly, Last Summer (1959); Taylor won a Golden Globe for Best Actress for the latter. Although she disliked her role as a call girl in BUtterfield 8 (1960), her last film for MGM, she won the Academy Award for Best Actress for the performance.

Taylor's best-known role was in Cleopatra (1963), which received multiple Academy Awards nominations—winning four—and a lavish production budget and schedule. She married her Cleopatra co-star Richard Burton in 1964, together with whom she starred in 11 films, including The V.I.P.s (1963), The Sandpiper (1965), The Taming of the Shrew (1967), and Who's Afraid of Virginia Woolf? (1966). Taylor received the best reviews of her career for Woolf, winning her second Academy Award and several other awards for her performance. Taylor's acting career began to decline in the late 1960s, although she continued to star in films until the mid-1970s.

Taylor's private life has been subject to intense media scrutiny and controversy, especially her marriages to Eddie Fisher and Burton, with Taylor starting the relationship with the former while he was married to another person, and with the latter while both were married to other people. She and Burton, dubbed "Liz and Dick", divorced in 1974 but reconciled soon after, remarrying in 1975. The second marriage ended in divorce in 1976, after which she focused on supporting the career of her sixth husband, United States Senator John Warner. In the 1980s, she acted in her first substantial stage roles and in several television films and series. She became the second celebrity to launch a perfume brand after Sophia Loren. Taylor was one of the first celebrities to take part in HIV/AIDS activism. She co-founded the American Foundation for AIDS Research in 1985 and the Elizabeth Taylor AIDS Foundation in 1991. From the early 1990s until her death in 2011, she dedicated her time to philanthropy, for which she received several accolades, including the Presidential Citizens Medal in 2002.

== Early life ==
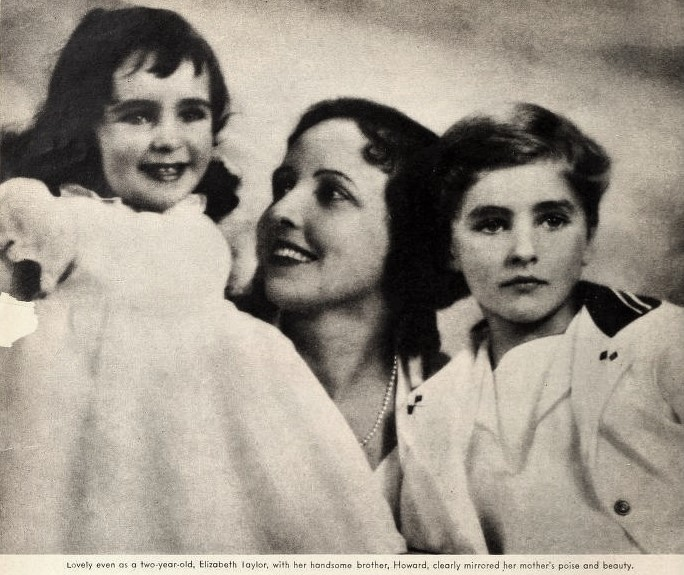
L to R: Taylor, aged two, with her mother Sara Sothern and brother Howard in 1934

Elizabeth Rosemond Taylor was born on February 27, 1932, at Heathwood, her family's home at 8 Wildwood Road in Hampstead Garden Suburb, northwest London, England. She received dual British and American citizenship at birth, as her parents, art dealer Francis Lenn Taylor (1897‍–‍1968) and stage actress Sara Sothern (1895‍–‍1994), were US citizens, originally from Arkansas City, Kansas. Through her father's family, she descended from the Taylors of Virginia and was a third great-granddaughter of Joseph Taylor. (Note: In October 1965, as her then-husband Richard Burton was British, she signed an oath of renunciation at the US Embassy in Paris, but with the phrase "abjure all allegiance and fidelity to the United States" struck out. US State Department officials declared that her renunciation was invalid due to the alteration, and Taylor signed another oath, this time without alteration, in October 1966. She applied for restoration of US citizenship in 1977, during then-husband John Warner's Senate campaign, stating she planned to remain in America for the rest of her life.)

They had moved to London in 1929 and opened an art gallery on Bond Street; their first child, a son named Howard (died 2020), was born the same year. Their social circle included artists Augustus John and Laura Knight, and politician Victor Cazalet. Cazalet was Taylor's unofficial godfather and an important influence in her early life. She was enrolled in Byron House School, a Montessori school in Highgate, and was raised in Christian Science, the religion of her mother and Cazalet.

In early 1939, fears of impending war in Europe grew for the Taylor family. US ambassador Joseph P. Kennedy contacted Francis, urging him to return to the US with his family. Sara and the children left first in April 1939 aboard the liner SS Manhattan and moved in with Taylor's maternal grandfather in Pasadena, California. Francis remained in London to close the gallery and joined them in December. In early 1940, he opened a new gallery in Los Angeles. After briefly living with the Chapman family in Pacific Palisades in northwestern Los Angeles, the Taylors settled in Beverly Hills, where the two children were enrolled in Hawthorne School.

== Career ==
=== 1941–1949: Early roles and teenage stardom ===
In California, Taylor's mother was frequently told that her daughter should audition for films. Taylor's eyes in particular drew attention; they were blue, to the extent of appearing violet, and were rimmed by dark double eyelashes caused by a genetic mutation. Sara was initially opposed to Taylor appearing in films, but after the outbreak of war in Europe made return there unlikely, she began to view the film industry as a way of assimilating to American society. Francis Taylor's Beverly Hills gallery had gained clients from the film industry soon after opening, helped by the endorsement of gossip columnist Hedda Hopper, a friend of the Cazalets. Through a client and a school friend's father, Taylor auditioned for both Universal Pictures and Metro-Goldwyn-Mayer in early 1941. Both studios offered Taylor contracts, and Sara Taylor chose to accept Universal's offer.

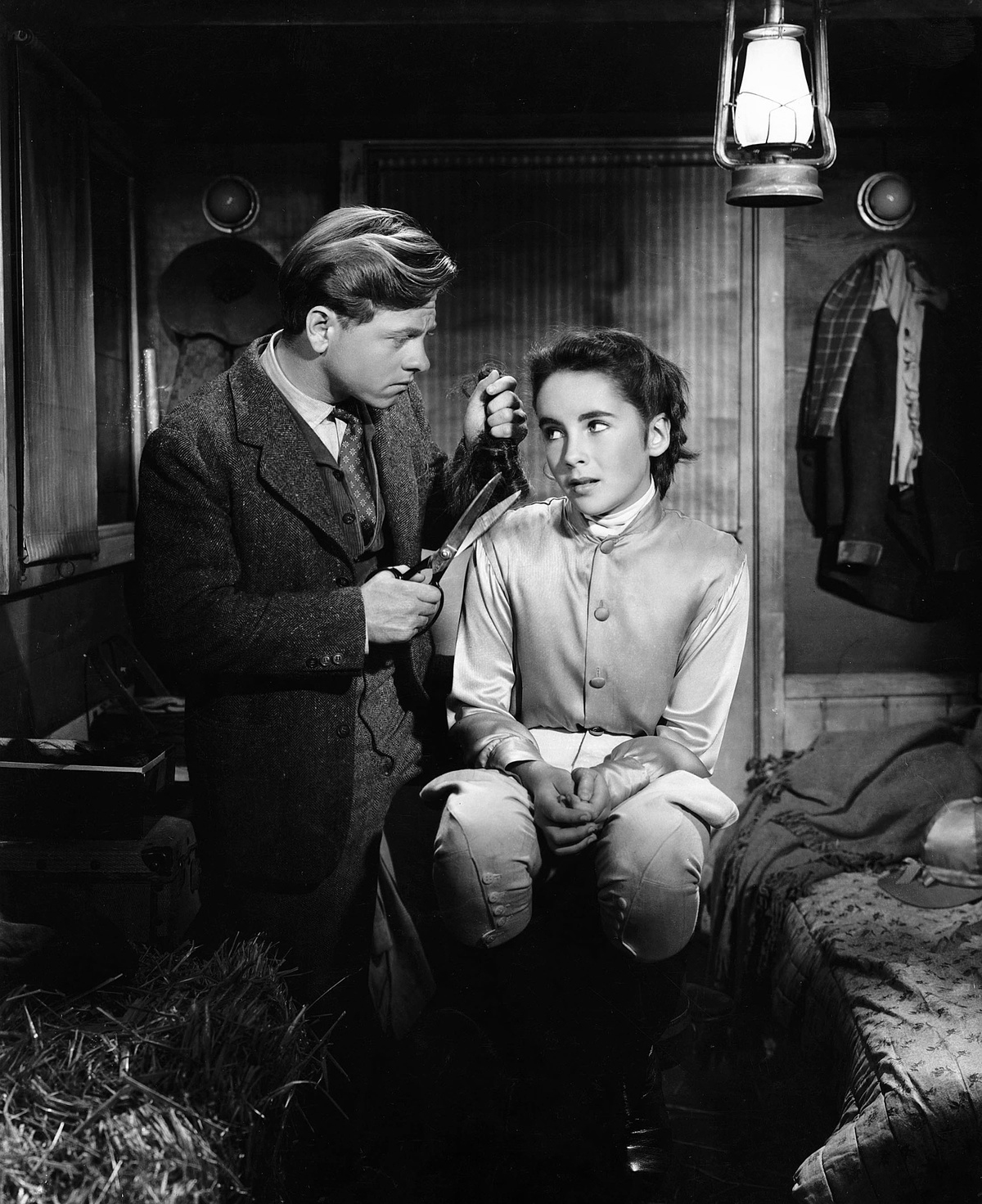
Mickey Rooney and Taylor in National Velvet (1944), her first major film role

Taylor began her contract in April 1941 and was cast in a small role in There's One Born Every Minute (1942). She did not receive other roles, and her contract was terminated after a year. Universal's casting director explained her dislike of Taylor, stating that "the kid has nothing ... her eyes are too old, she doesn't have the face of a child". Biographer Alexander Walker agrees that Taylor looked different from the child stars of the era, such as Shirley Temple and Judy Garland. Taylor later said that, "apparently, I used to frighten grown ups, because I was totally direct". Taylor received another opportunity in late 1942, when her father's acquaintance, MGM producer Samuel Marx, arranged for her to audition for a minor role in Lassie Come Home (1943), which required a child actress with an English accent. After a trial contract of three months, she was given a standard seven-year contract in January 1943. Following Lassie, she appeared in minor uncredited roles in two other films set in England – Jane Eyre (1943) playing Helen Burns, and The White Cliffs of Dover (1944).

Taylor was cast in her first starring role at the age of 12, when she was chosen to play a girl who wants to compete as a jockey in the exclusively male Grand National in National Velvet. She later called it "the most exciting film" of her career. Since 1937, MGM had been looking for a suitable actress with a British accent and the ability to ride horses. Gene Tierney (12 years older than Taylor) was the first option, but finally they decided on Taylor at the recommendation of White Cliffs director Clarence Brown, who knew she had the necessary skills. At that time Taylor was deemed too short for the role, so filming was delayed several months in order for her to grow an inch or two. In the interim Taylor spent her time practicing her horseback riding. In MGM's effort developing Taylor into a film star, they required her to wear braces to straighten her teeth and have two of her baby teeth pulled out. The studio also wanted to dye her hair and change the shape of her eyebrows, even proposing that she use the screen name "Virginia", but Taylor and her parents refused.

National Velvet became a box-office success upon its release on Christmas 1944, earning two Academy Award nominations. Bosley Crowther of The New York Times stated that "her whole manner in this picture is one of refreshing grace", while James Agee of The Nation wrote that she "is rapturously beautiful... I hardly know or care whether she can act or not."

Taylor later stated that her childhood ended when she became a star, as MGM started to control every aspect of her life. She described the studio as a "big extended factory", where she was required to adhere to a strict daily schedule. Her days were spent attending school and filming at the studio lot. In the evenings, Taylor took dancing and singing classes, and practised the following day's scenes. Following the success of National Velvet, MGM gave Taylor a new seven-year contract with a weekly salary of $750. They cast her in a minor role in the third film of the Lassie series, Courage of Lassie (1946). MGM also published a book of Taylor's writings about her pet chipmunk, Nibbles and Me (1946), and had paper dolls and coloring books made in her likeness.

When Taylor turned 15 in 1947, MGM began to cultivate a more mature public image for her by organizing photo shoots and interviews that portrayed her as a "normal" teenager attending parties and going on dates. Film magazines and gossip columnists also began comparing her to older actresses such as Ava Gardner and Lana Turner. Life called her "Hollywood's most accomplished junior actress" for her two film roles that year. In the critically panned Cynthia (1947), Taylor portrayed a frail girl who defies her over-protective parents to go to the prom; in the period film Life with Father (1947), opposite William Powell and Irene Dunne, she portrayed the love interest of a stockbroker's son.

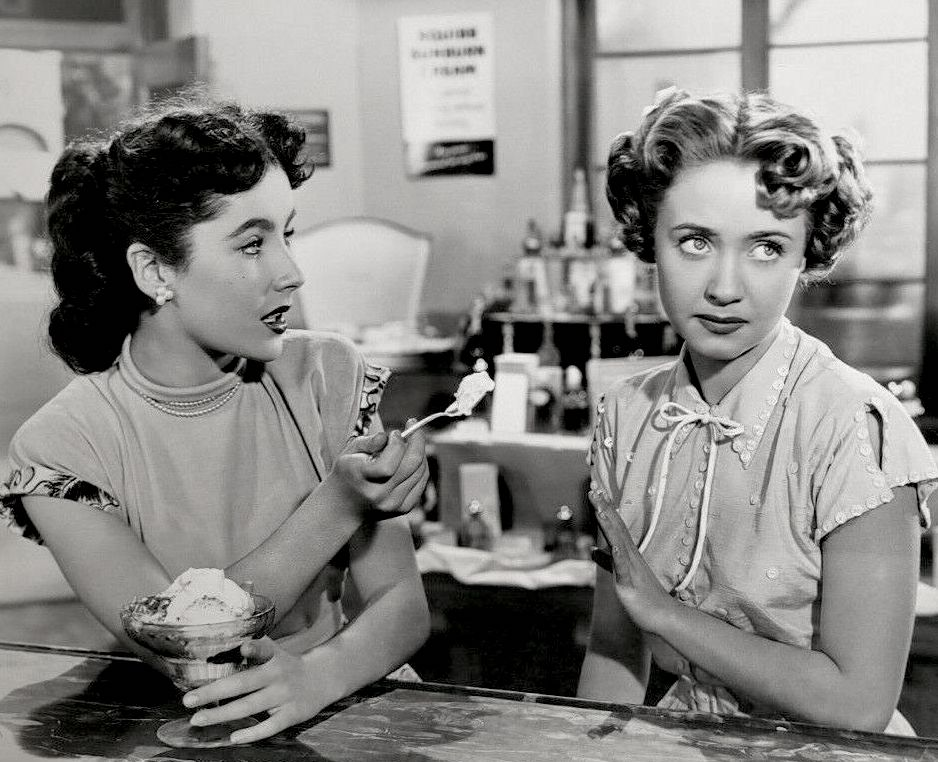
Taylor and Jane Powell in A Date with Judy (1948)

They were followed by supporting roles as a teenaged "man-stealer" who seduces her peer's date to a high school dance in the musical A Date with Judy (1948), and as a bride in the romantic comedy Julia Misbehaves (1948). This became a commercial success, grossing over $4 million in the box office. Taylor's last adolescent role was as Amy March in Mervyn LeRoy's Little Women (1949), a box-office success. The same year, Time featured Taylor on its cover and called her the leader among Hollywood's next generation of stars, "a jewel of great price, a true sapphire".

=== 1949–1951: Transition to adult roles ===
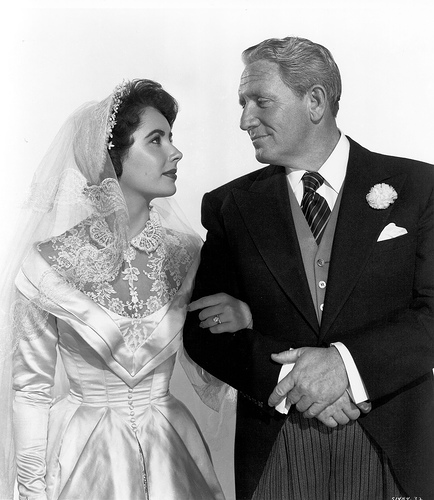
Taylor with Spencer Tracy in Father of the Bride (1950)

In her first mature role, the thriller Conspirator (1949), she plays a woman who begins to suspect that her husband is a Soviet spy. Taylor had been only 16 at the time of its filming, but its release was delayed until March 1950, as MGM disliked it and feared it could cause diplomatic problems. Taylor's second film of 1950 was the comedy The Big Hangover (1950), co-starring Van Johnson. It was released in May. That same month, Taylor married hotel-chain heir Conrad "Nicky" Hilton Jr. in a highly publicized ceremony. The event was organized by MGM, and used as part of the publicity campaign for Taylor's next film, Vincente Minnelli's comedy Father of the Bride (1950), in which she appeared opposite Spencer Tracy and Joan Bennett as a bride preparing for her wedding. The film became a box-office success upon its release in June, grossing $6 million worldwide ($80 million in 2025 dollars), and was followed by a successful sequel, Father's Little Dividend (1951), ten months later.

Taylor's next film release, George Stevens' A Place in the Sun (1951), marked a departure from her earlier films. According to Taylor, it was the first film in which she had been asked to act, instead of simply being herself, and it brought her critical acclaim for the first time since National Velvet. Based on Theodore Dreiser's novel An American Tragedy (1925), it featured Taylor as a spoiled socialite who comes between a poor factory worker (Montgomery Clift) and his pregnant girlfriend (Shelley Winters). Stevens cast Taylor as she was "the only one ... who could create this illusion" of being "not so much a real girl as the girl on the candy-box cover, the beautiful girl in the yellow Cadillac convertible that every American boy sometime or other thinks he can marry."

A Place in the Sun was a critical and commercial success, grossing $3 million. Herb Golden of Variety said that Taylor's "histrionics are of a quality so far beyond anything she has done previously, that Stevens' skilled hands on the reins must be credited with a minor miracle." A. H. Weiler of The New York Times wrote that she gives "a shaded, tender performance, and one in which her passionate and genuine romance avoids the pathos common to young love as it sometimes comes to the screen."

=== 1952–1955: Continued success at MGM ===
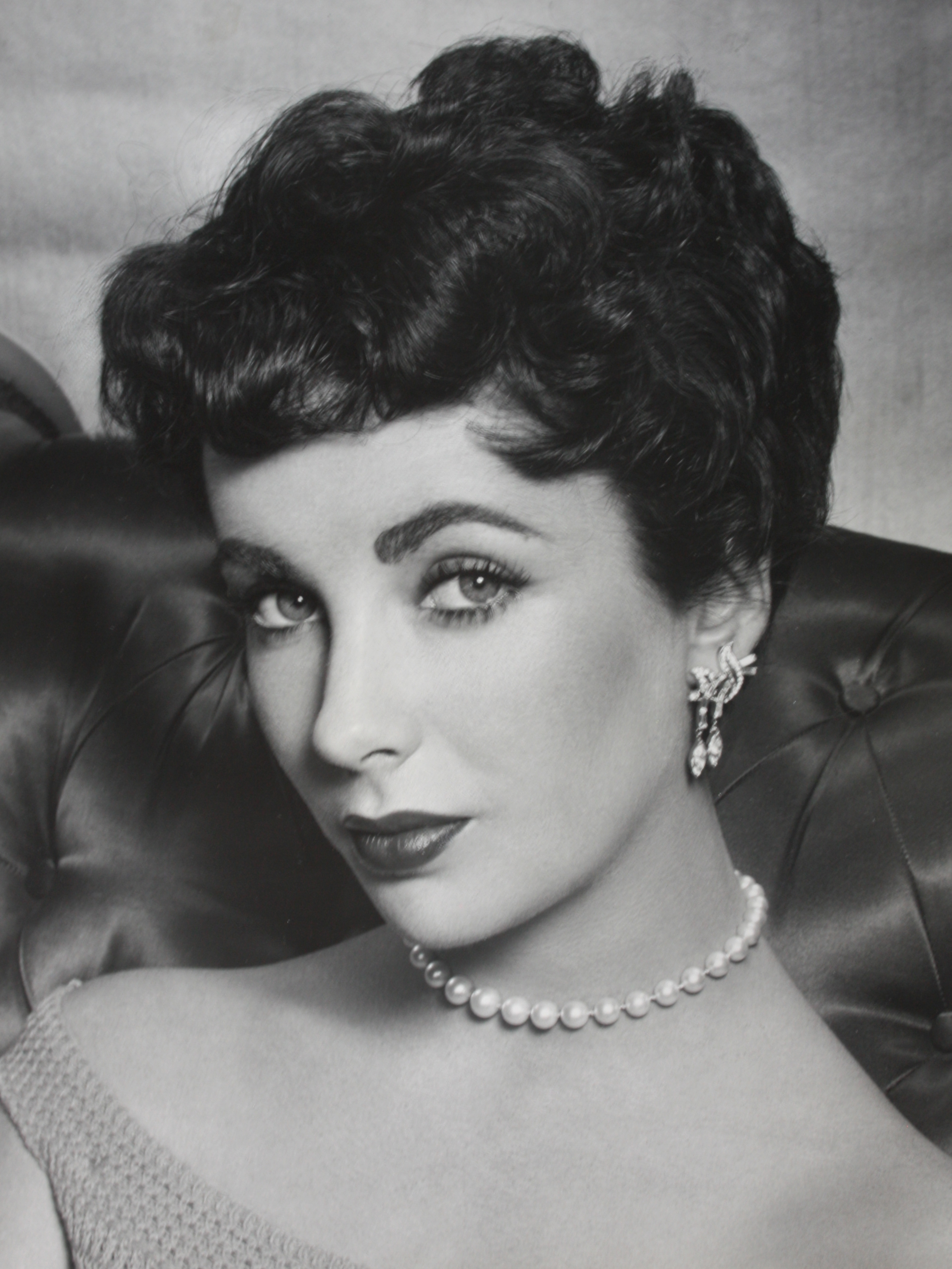
Portrait, 1952

Taylor next starred in the romantic comedy Love Is Better Than Ever (1952). According to Alexander Walker, MGM cast her in the "B-picture" as a reprimand for divorcing Hilton in January 1951 after only eight months of marriage, which had caused a public scandal that reflected negatively on her. After completing Love Is Better Than Ever, Taylor was sent to Britain to take part in the historical epic Ivanhoe (1952), which was one of the most expensive projects in the studio's history. She was not happy about the project, finding the story superficial and her role as Rebecca too small. Regardless, Ivanhoe became one of MGM's biggest commercial successes, earning $11 million in worldwide rentals.

Taylor's last film made under her old contract with MGM was The Girl Who Had Everything (1953), a remake of the pre-code drama A Free Soul (1931). Despite her grievances with the studio, Taylor signed a new seven-year contract with MGM in the summer of 1952. Although she wanted more interesting roles, the decisive factor in continuing with the studio was her financial need; she had recently married British actor Michael Wilding, and was pregnant with her first child. In addition to granting her a weekly salary of $4,700 ($56,558 in 2025 dollars), MGM agreed to give the couple a loan for a house, and signed her husband for a three-year contract. Due to her financial dependency, the studio now had even more control over her than previously.

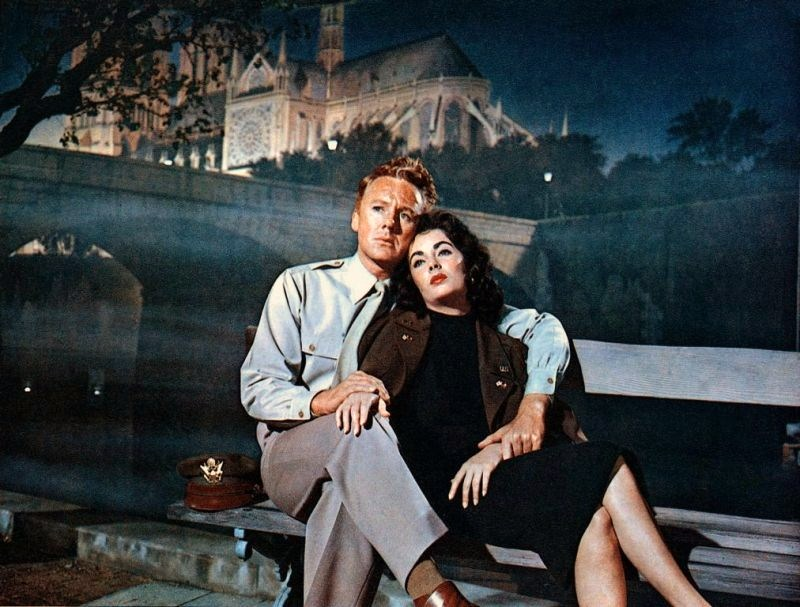
Van Johnson and Taylor in the romantic drama The Last Time I Saw Paris (1954)

Taylor's first two films made under her new contract were released ten days apart in early 1954. The first was Rhapsody, a romantic film starring her as a woman caught in a love triangle with two musicians. The second was Elephant Walk, a drama in which she played a British woman struggling to adapt to life on her husband's tea plantation in Ceylon. She had been loaned to Paramount Pictures for the film after its original star, Vivien Leigh, fell ill. In the Fall, Taylor starred in two more film releases. Beau Brummell was a Regency era period film, another project in which she was cast against her will. Taylor disliked historical films in general, as their elaborate costumes and makeup required her to wake up earlier than usual to prepare. She later said that she gave one of the worst performances of her career in Beau Brummell. The second film was Richard Brooks' The Last Time I Saw Paris, based on F. Scott Fitzgerald's short story. Although she had wanted to be cast in The Barefoot Contessa (1954) instead, Taylor liked the Brooks film and later stated that it "convinced me I wanted to be an actress instead of yawning my way through parts." While The Last Time I Saw Paris was not as profitable as many other MGM films, it garnered positive reviews. Taylor became pregnant again during the production, and had to agree to add another year to her contract to make up for the period spent on maternity leave.

=== 1956–1961: Critical acclaim ===
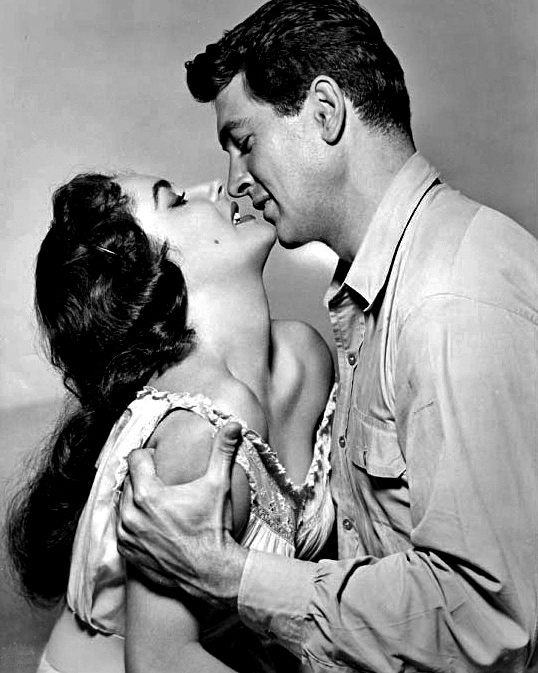
Taylor and Rock Hudson in Giant (1956)

By the mid-1950s, the American film industry was beginning to face serious competition from television, which resulted in studios producing fewer films, and focusing instead on their quality. The change benefited Taylor, who finally found more challenging roles after several years of career disappointments. After lobbying director George Stevens, she won the female lead role in Giant (1956), an epic drama about a ranching dynasty, which co-starred Rock Hudson and her close friend James Dean. Its filming in Marfa, Texas, was a difficult experience for Taylor, as she clashed with Stevens, who wanted to break her will to make her easier to direct, and was often ill, resulting in delays. To further complicate the production, Dean died in a car accident only days after completing filming; the grieving Taylor still had to film reaction shots to their joint scenes. When Giant was released a year later, it became a box-office success, and was widely praised by critics. Although not nominated for an Academy Award like her co-stars, Taylor garnered positive reviews for her performance, with Variety calling it "surprisingly clever", and The Manchester Guardian lauding her acting as "an astonishing revelation of unsuspected gifts." It named her one of the film's strongest assets.

MGM reunited Taylor with Montgomery Clift in Raintree County (1957), a Civil War drama which it hoped would replicate the success of Gone with the Wind (1939). Taylor found her role as a mentally disturbed Southern belle fascinating, but overall disliked the film. Although the film failed to become the type of success MGM had planned, Taylor was nominated for the first time for an Academy Award for Best Actress for her performance.

Taylor considered her next performance as Maggie the Cat in the screen adaptation of the Tennessee Williams play Cat on a Hot Tin Roof (1958) a career "high point", but it coincided with one of the most difficult periods in her personal life. After completing Raintree County, she had divorced Wilding and married producer Mike Todd. She had completed only two weeks of filming in March 1958, when Todd was killed in a plane crash. Although she was devastated, pressure from the studio and the knowledge that Todd had large debts led Taylor to return to work only three weeks later. She later said that "in a way ... [she] became Maggie", and that acting "was the only time I could function" in the weeks after Todd's death.

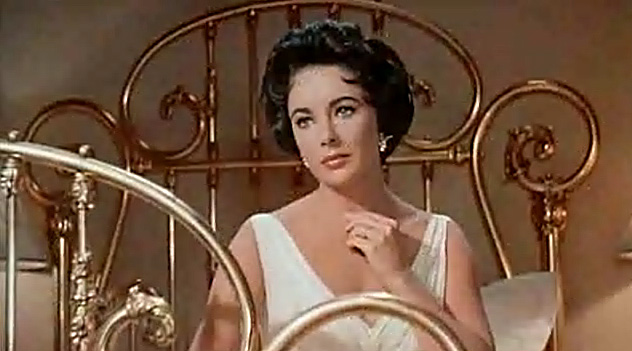
Taylor in Cat on a Hot Tin Roof (1958)

During the production, Taylor's personal life drew more attention when she began an affair with singer Eddie Fisher, whose marriage to actress Debbie Reynolds had been idealized by the media as the union of "America's sweethearts." The affair – and Fisher's subsequent divorce – changed Taylor's public image from a grieving widow to a "homewrecker". MGM used the scandal to its advantage by featuring an image of Taylor posing on a bed in a slip in the film's promotional posters. Cat grossed $10 million in American cinemas alone and made Taylor the year's second-most profitable star. She received positive reviews for her performance, with Bosley Crowther of The New York Times calling her "terrific", and Variety praising her for "a well-accented, perceptive interpretation." Taylor was nominated for an Academy Award and a BAFTA.

Taylor's next film, Joseph L. Mankiewicz's Suddenly, Last Summer (1959), was another Tennessee Williams adaptation, with a screenplay by Gore Vidal and also starring Montgomery Clift and Katharine Hepburn. The independent production earned Taylor $500,000 for playing the role of a traumatized patient in a mental institution. Although the film was a drama about mental illness, childhood traumas, and homosexuality, it was again promoted with Taylor's sex appeal; both its trailer and poster featured her in a white swimsuit. The strategy worked, as the film was a financial success. Taylor received her third Academy Award nomination and her first Golden Globe for Best Actress for her performance.

By 1959, Taylor owed one more film for MGM, which it decided should be BUtterfield 8 (1960), a drama about a high-class call girl, in an adaptation of John O'Hara's 1935 novel of the same name. The studio correctly calculated that Taylor's public image would make it easy for audiences to associate her with the role. She hated the film for the same reason, but had no choice in the matter, although the studio agreed to her demands of filming in New York and casting Eddie Fisher in a sympathetic role. As predicted, BUtterfield 8 was a major commercial success, grossing $18 million in world rentals. Crowther wrote that Taylor "looks like a million dollars, in mink or in negligée", while Variety stated that she gives "a torrid, stinging portrayal with one or two brilliantly executed passages within." Taylor won her first Academy Award for Best Actress for her performance.

=== 1961–1967: Cleopatra and other collaborations with Richard Burton ===
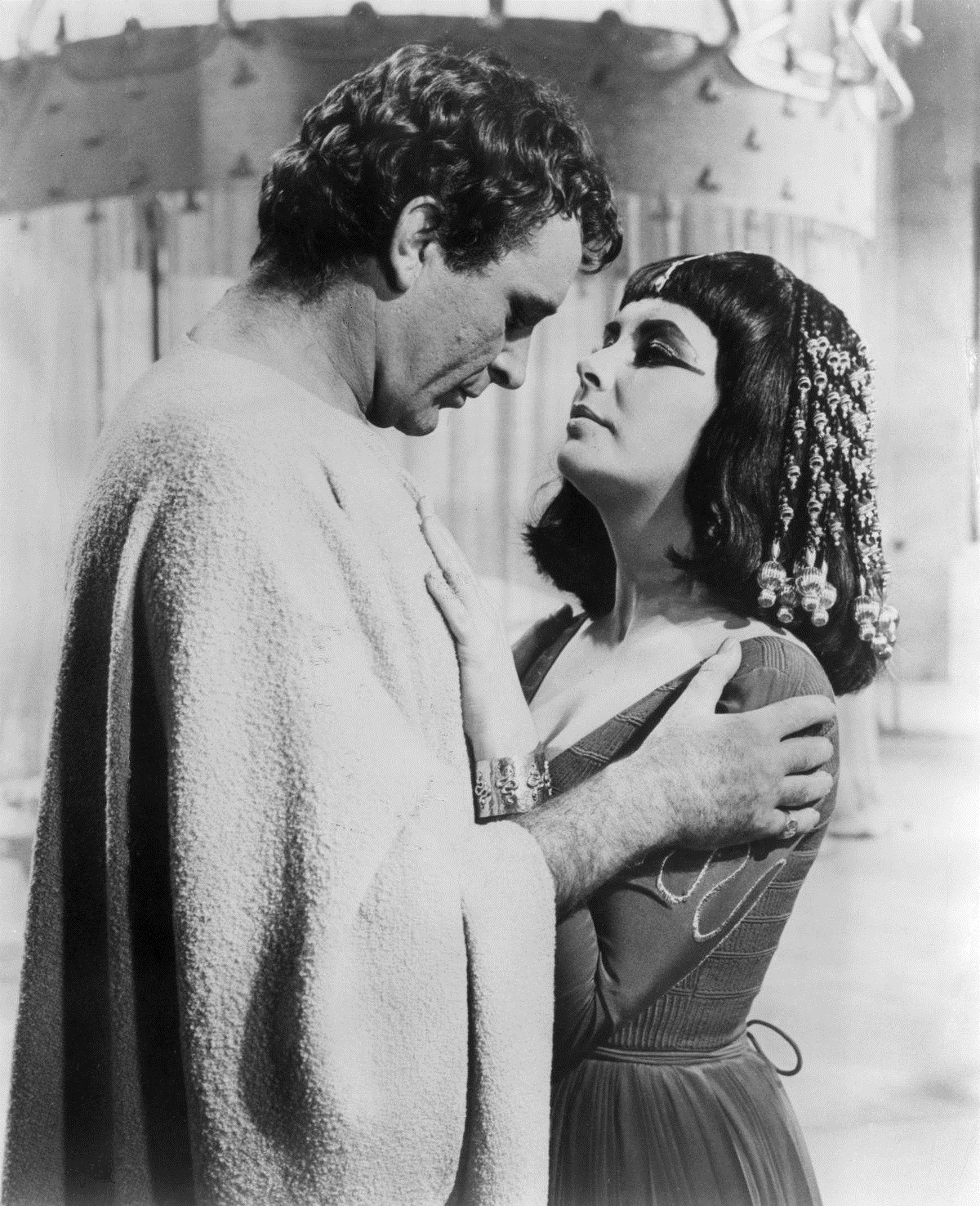
Richard Burton as Mark Antony with Taylor as Cleopatra in Cleopatra (1963)

After completing her MGM contract, Taylor starred in 20th Century-Fox's Cleopatra (1963). According to film historian Alexander Doty, this historical epic made her more famous than ever before. She became the first movie star to be paid $1 million for a role; Fox also granted her 10% of the film's gross profits, as well as shooting the film in Todd-AO, a widescreen format for which she had inherited the rights from Mike Todd. The film's production – characterized by costly sets and costumes, constant delays, and a scandal caused by Taylor's extramarital affair with her co-star Richard Burton – was closely followed by the media, with Life proclaiming it the "Most Talked About Movie Ever Made." Filming began in England in 1960 but had to be halted several times because of bad weather and Taylor's ill health. In March 1961, she developed nearly fatal pneumonia, which necessitated a tracheotomy; one news agency erroneously reported that she had died. Once she had recovered, Fox discarded the already filmed material, and moved the production to Rome, changing its director to Joseph Mankiewicz, and the actor playing Mark Antony to Burton. Filming was finally completed in July 1962. The film's final cost was $62 million (equivalent to $660 million in 2025), making it the most expensive film made up to that point.

Cleopatra became the biggest box-office success of 1963 in the United States; the film grossed $15.7 million at the box office (equivalent to $165 million in 2025). Regardless, it took several years for the film to earn back its production costs, which nearly drove Fox to bankruptcy. The studio publicly blamed Taylor for the production's troubles and unsuccessfully sued Burton and Taylor for allegedly damaging the film's commercial prospects with their behavior. The film's reviews were mixed to negative, with critics finding Taylor overweight and her voice too thin, and unfavorably comparing her with her classically trained British co-stars. In retrospect, Taylor called Cleopatra a "low point" in her career, and said that the studio had cut out the scenes which she felt provided the "core of the characterization."

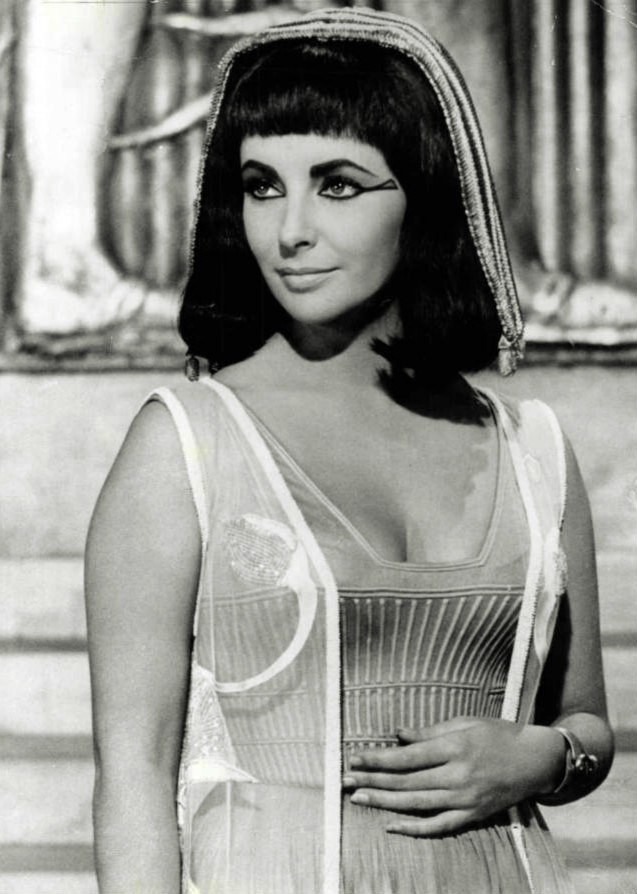
Taylor as Cleopatra in Cleopatra

Taylor intended to follow Cleopatra by headlining an all-star cast in Fox's black comedy What a Way to Go! (1964), but negotiations fell through, and Shirley MacLaine was cast instead. In the meantime, film producers were eager to profit from the scandal surrounding Taylor and Burton, and they next starred together in Anthony Asquith's The V.I.P.s (1963), which mirrored the headlines about them. Taylor played a famous model attempting to leave her husband for a lover, and Burton her estranged millionaire husband. Released soon after Cleopatra, it became a box-office success. Taylor was also paid $500,000 (equivalent to $5.26 million in 2025) to appear in a CBS television special, Elizabeth Taylor in London, in which she visited the city's landmarks and recited passages from the works of famous British writers.

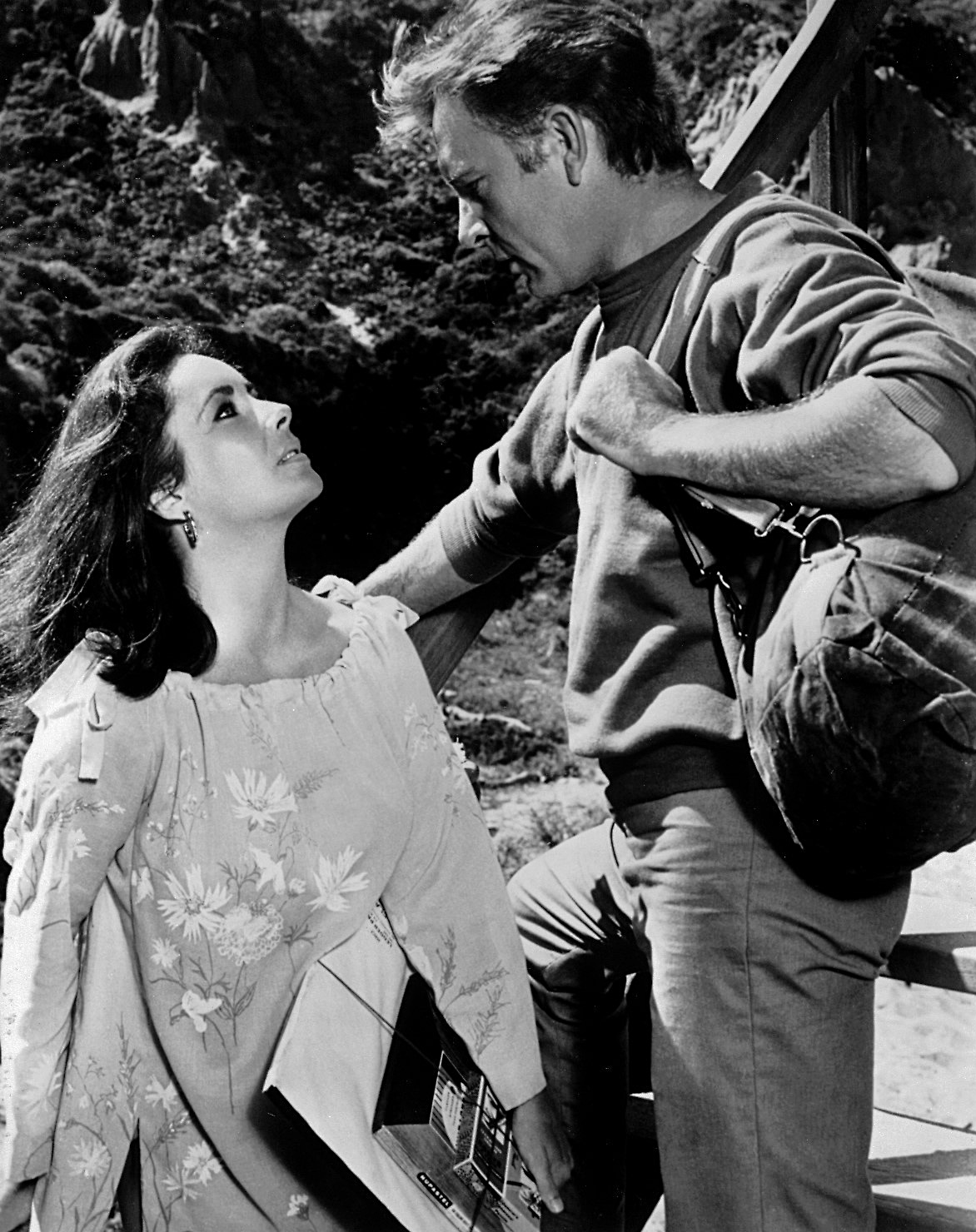
Taylor and Burton in The Sandpiper (1965)

After completing The V.I.P.s, Taylor took a two-year hiatus from films, during which she and Burton divorced their spouses and married each other. The supercouple continued starring together in films in the mid-1960s, earning a combined $88 million over the next decade; Burton once stated, "They say we generate more business activity than one of the smaller African nations." Biographer Alexander Walker compared these films to "illustrated gossip columns", as their film roles often reflected their public personae, while film historian Alexander Doty has noted that the majority of Taylor's films during this period seemed to "conform to, and reinforce, the image of an indulgent, raucous, immoral or amoral, and appetitive (in many senses of the word) 'Elizabeth Taylor'". Taylor and Burton's first joint project following her hiatus was Vincente Minnelli's romantic drama The Sandpiper (1965), about an illicit love affair between a bohemian artist and a married clergyman in Big Sur, California. Its reviews were largely negative, but it grossed a successful $14 million in the box office (equivalent to $143 million in 2025).

Their next project, Who's Afraid of Virginia Woolf? (1966), an adaptation of a play of the same name by Edward Albee, featured the most critically acclaimed performance of Taylor's career. She and Burton starred as Martha and George, a middle-aged couple going through a marital crisis. In order to convincingly play 50-year-old Martha, Taylor gained weight, wore a wig, and used makeup to make herself look older and tired – in stark contrast to her public image as a glamorous film star. At Taylor's suggestion, theatre director Mike Nichols was hired to direct the project, despite his lack of experience with film. The production differed from anything she had done previously, as Nichols wanted to thoroughly rehearse the play before beginning filming. Woolf was considered ground-breaking for its adult themes and uncensored language, and opened to "glorious" reviews. Variety wrote that Taylor's "characterization is at once sensual, spiteful, cynical, pitiable, loathsome, lustful, and tender." Stanley Kauffmann of The New York Times stated that she "does the best work of her career, sustained and urgent." The film also became one of the biggest commercial successes of the year. Taylor received her second Academy Award, and BAFTA, National Board of Review, and New York City Film Critics Circle awards for her performance.

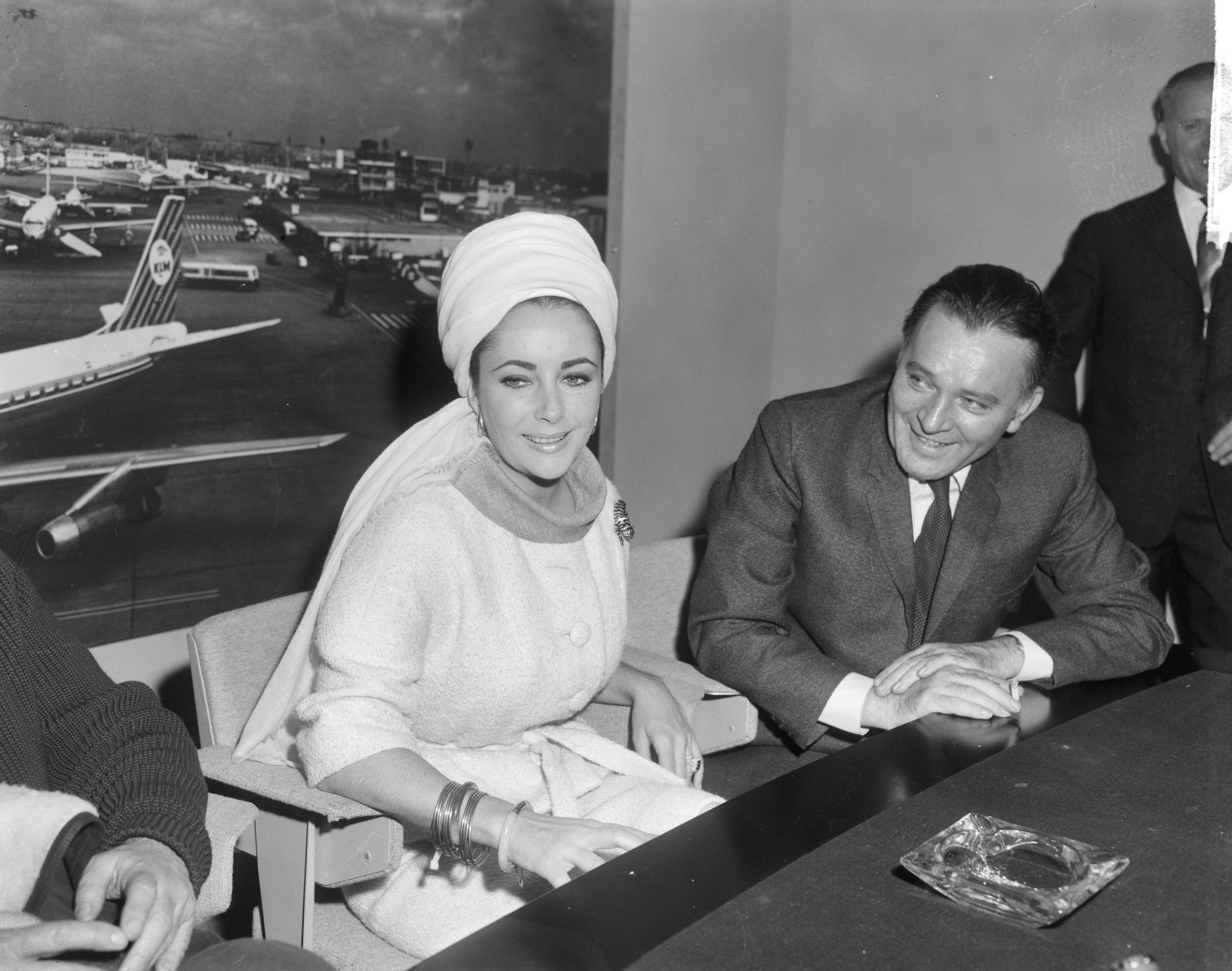
Taylor and Burton in 1965

In 1966, Taylor and Burton performed Doctor Faustus for a week in Oxford to benefit the Oxford University Dramatic Society; he starred and she appeared in her first stage role as Helen of Troy, a part which required no speaking. Although it received generally negative reviews, Burton produced it as a film, Doctor Faustus (1967), with the same cast. The film was also panned by critics and grossed only $600,000 in the box office (equivalent to $5.79 million in 2025). Taylor and Burton's next project, Franco Zeffirelli's The Taming of the Shrew (1967), which they also co-produced, was more successful. It posed another challenge for Taylor, as she was the only actor in the project with no previous experience of performing Shakespeare; Zeffirelli later stated that this made her performance interesting, as she "invented the part from scratch." Critics found the play to be fitting material for the couple, and the film became a box-office success by grossing $12 million (equivalent to $115.87 million in 2025).

Taylor's third film released in 1967, John Huston's Reflections in a Golden Eye, was her first without Burton since Cleopatra. Based on a novel of the same name by Carson McCullers, it was a drama about a repressed gay military officer and his unfaithful wife. It was originally slated to co-star Taylor's old friend Montgomery Clift, whose career had been in decline for several years owing to his substance abuse problems. Determined to secure his involvement in the project, Taylor even offered to pay for his insurance. But Clift died from a heart attack before filming began; he was replaced in the role by Marlon Brando. Reflections was a critical and commercial failure at the time of its release. Taylor and Burton's last film of the year was the adaptation of Graham Greene's novel, The Comedians, which received mixed reviews and was a box-office disappointment.

=== 1968–1979: Career decline ===
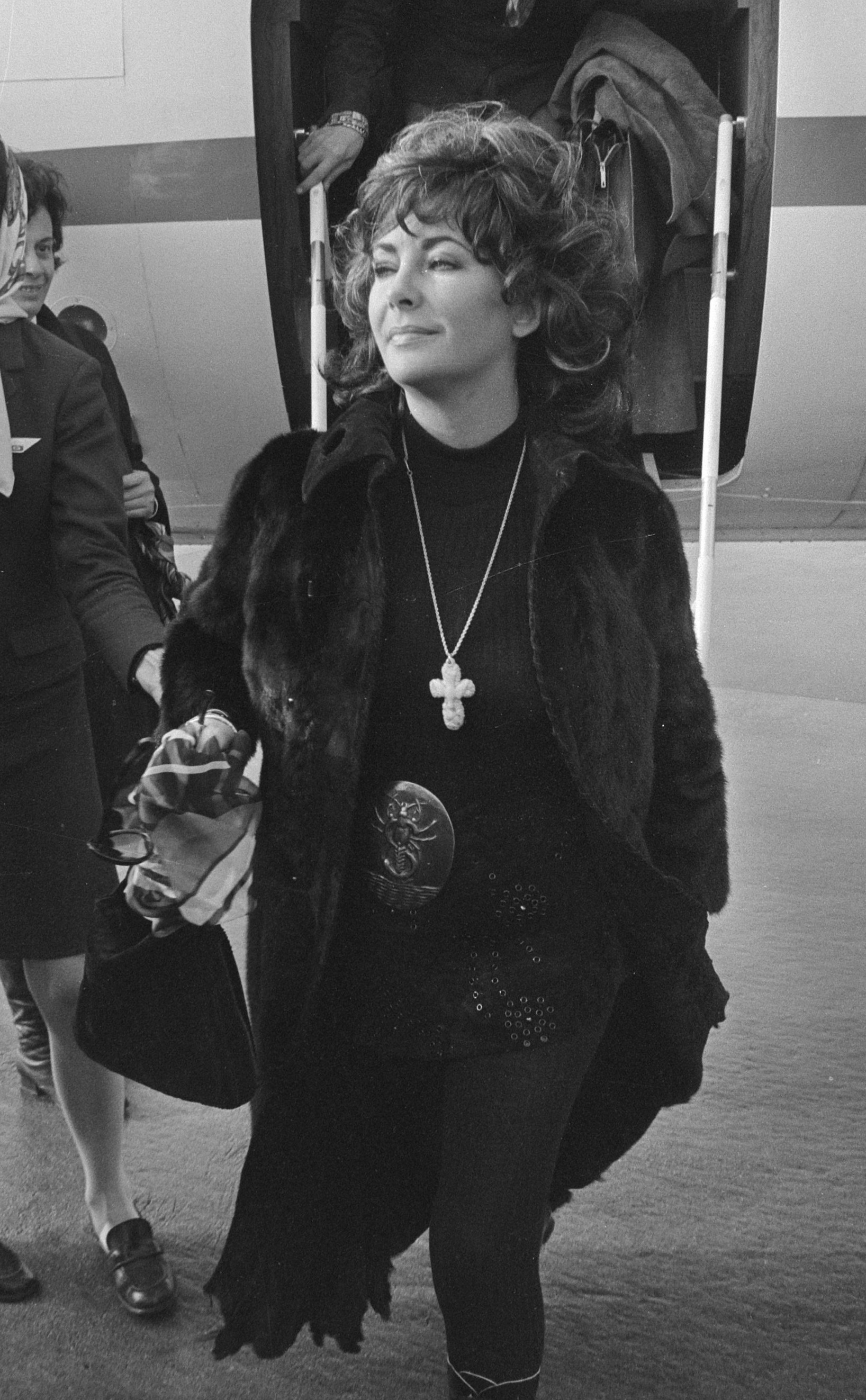
Taylor in 1971

Taylor's career was in decline by the late 1960s. She had gained weight, was in her late 30s and did not fit in with New Hollywood stars such as Jane Fonda and Julie Christie. After several years of nearly constant media attention, the public was tiring of Burton and her, and criticized their jet set lifestyle. In 1968, Taylor starred in two films directed by Joseph Losey – Boom! and Secret Ceremony – both of which were critical and commercial failures. The former, based on Tennessee Williams' The Milk Train Doesn't Stop Here Anymore, features her as an ageing, serial-marrying millionaire, and Burton as a younger man who turns up on the Mediterranean island on which she has retired. Secret Ceremony is a psychological drama that also stars Mia Farrow and Robert Mitchum. Taylor's third film with George Stevens, The Only Game in Town (1970), in which she played a Las Vegas showgirl who has an affair with a compulsive gambler, played by Warren Beatty, was unsuccessful.

The three 1972 films in which Taylor acted were somewhat more successful. X Y & Zee, which portrayed Michael Caine and her as a troubled married couple, won her the David di Donatello for Best Foreign Actress. She appeared with Burton in the adaptation of Dylan Thomas's Under Milk Wood; although her role was small, the producers decided to give her top-billing to profit from her fame. Her third film role that year was playing a blonde diner waitress in Peter Ustinov's Faust parody Hammersmith Is Out, her tenth collaboration with Burton. Despite limited commercial success, Taylor garnered positive reviews, with Vincent Canby of The New York Times writing that she has "a certain vulgar, ratty charm", and Roger Ebert of the Chicago Sun-Times saying, "The spectacle of Elizabeth Taylor growing older and more beautiful continues to amaze the population." Her performance won the Silver Bear for Best Actress at the Berlin Film Festival.

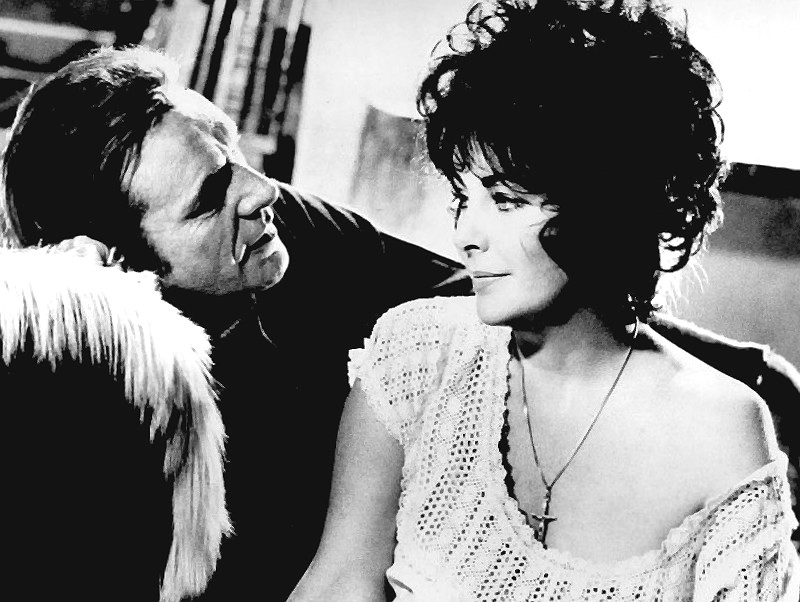
Taylor in Divorce His, Divorce Hers (1973), her last film with Burton

Taylor and Burton's last film together was the Harlech Television film Divorce His, Divorce Hers (1973), fittingly named as they divorced the following year. Her other films released in 1973 were the British thriller Night Watch (1973) and the American drama Ash Wednesday (1973). For the latter, in which she starred as a woman who undergoes multiple plastic surgeries in an attempt to save her marriage, she received a Golden Globe nomination. Her only film released in 1974, the Italian Muriel Spark adaptation The Driver's Seat (1974), was a failure.

Taylor took fewer roles after the mid-1970s, and focused on supporting the career of her sixth husband, Republican politician John Warner, a US senator. In 1976, she participated in the Soviet-American fantasy film The Blue Bird (1976), a critical and box-office failure, and had a small role in the television film Victory at Entebbe (1976). In 1977, she sang in the critically panned film adaptation of Stephen Sondheim's musical A Little Night Music (1977).

=== 1980–2007: Final film roles, focus on stage and television roles, and retirement ===
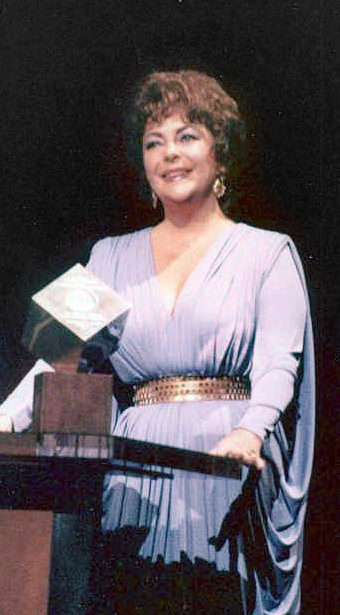
Taylor in 1981 at an event honoring her career

After a period of semi-retirement from films, Taylor starred in The Mirror Crack'd (1980), adapted from an Agatha Christie mystery novel and featuring an ensemble cast of actors from the studio era, such as Angela Lansbury, Kim Novak, Rock Hudson, and Tony Curtis. Wanting to challenge herself, she took on her first substantial stage role, playing Regina Giddens in a Broadway production of Lillian Hellman's The Little Foxes. Instead of portraying Giddens in negative light, as had often been the case in previous productions, Taylor's idea was to show her as a victim of circumstance, explaining, "She's a killer, but she's saying, 'Sorry fellas, you put me in this position'."

The production premiered in May 1981, and had a sold-out six-month run despite mixed reviews. Frank Rich of The New York Times wrote that Taylor's performance as "Regina Giddens, that malignant Southern bitch-goddess ... begins gingerly, soon gathers steam, and then explodes into a black and thunderous storm that may just knock you out of your seat", while Dan Sullivan of the Los Angeles Times stated, "Taylor presents a possible Regina Giddens, as seen through the persona of Elizabeth Taylor. There's some acting in it, as well as some personal display." She appeared as evil socialite Helena Cassadine in the day-time soap opera General Hospital in November 1981. The following year, she continued performing The Little Foxes in London's West End but received largely negative reviews from the British press.

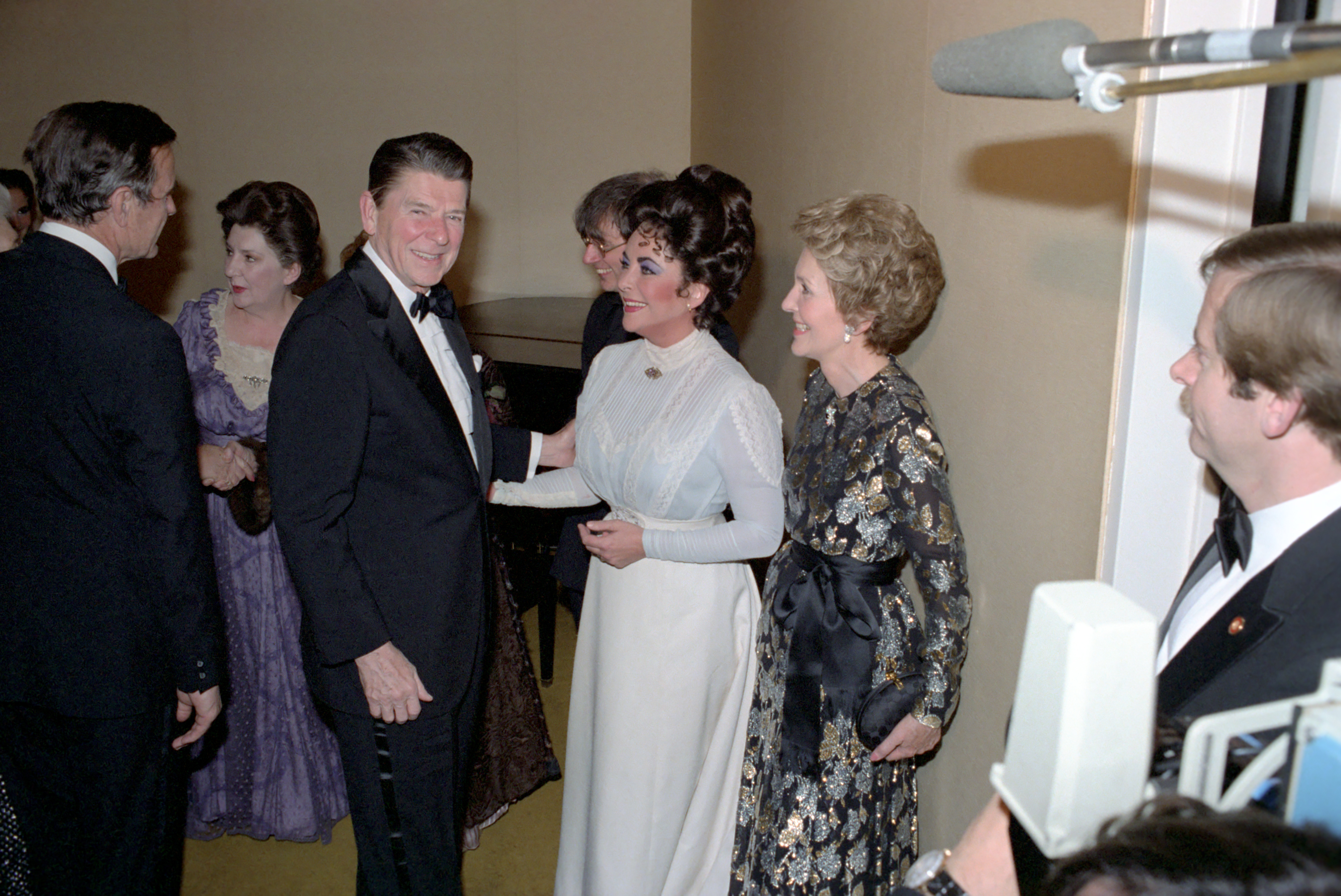
Taylor (center) with President Ronald Reagan (third from left) and First Lady Nancy Reagan (second from right) after an performance of The Little Foxes at the Kennedy Center in 1981

Encouraged by the success of The Little Foxes, Taylor and producer Zev Buffman founded the Elizabeth Taylor Repertory Company. Its first and only production was a revival of Noël Coward's comedy Private Lives, starring Taylor and Burton. It premiered in Boston in early 1983, and although commercially successful, received generally negative reviews, with critics noting that both stars were in noticeably poor health – Taylor admitted herself to a drug and alcohol rehabilitation center after the play's run ended, and Burton died the following year. After the failure of Private Lives, Taylor dissolved her theatre company. Her only other project that year was the television film Between Friends.

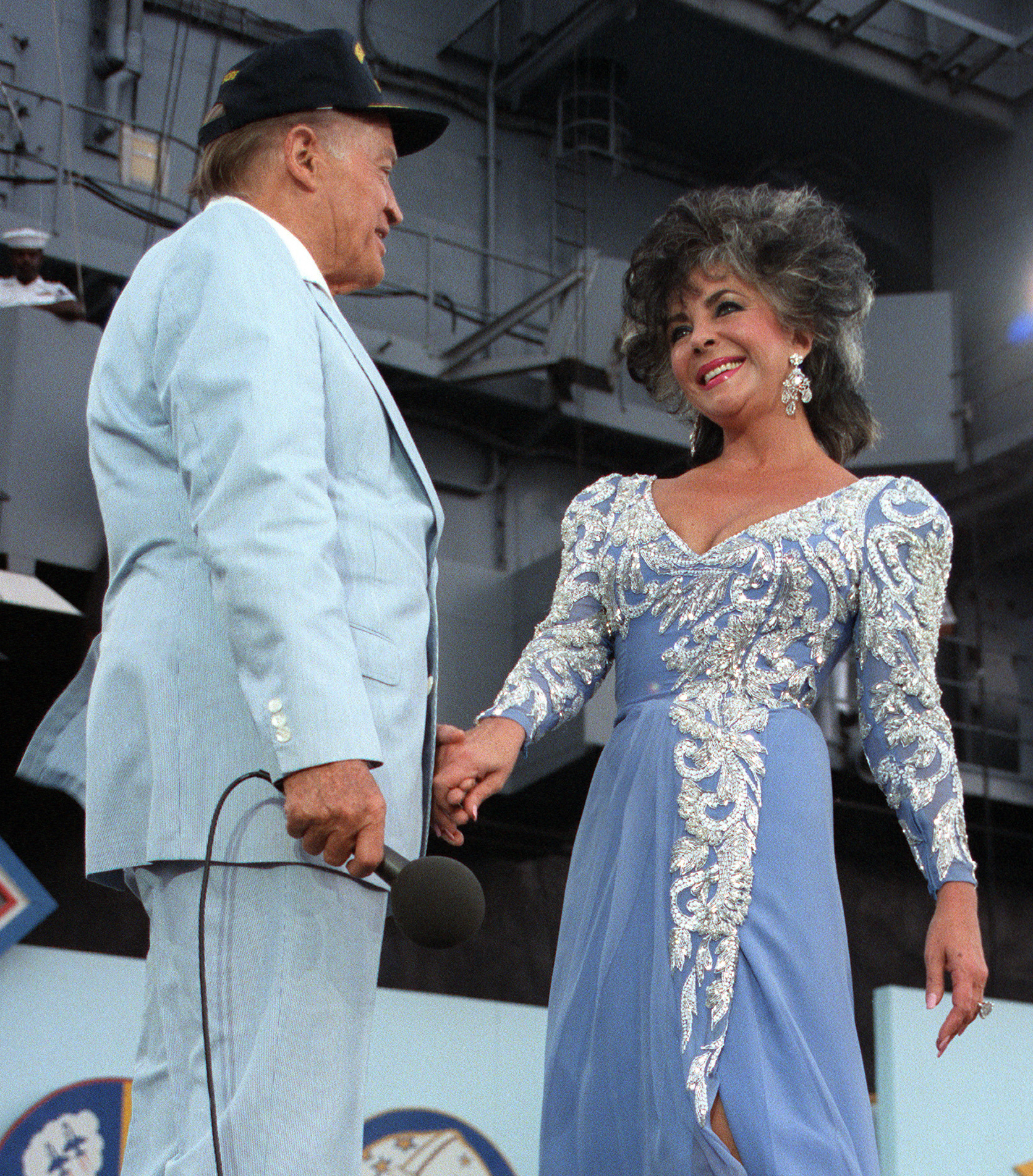
Taylor with Bob Hope performing in a United Service Organization show aboard the training aircraft carrier USS Lexington during the celebration of the 75th anniversary of naval aviation in 1986.

From the mid-1980s, Taylor acted mostly in television productions. She made cameos in the soap operas Hotel and All My Children in 1984, and played a brothel keeper in the historical mini-series North and South in 1985. She also starred in several television films, playing gossip columnist Louella Parsons in Malice in Wonderland (1985), a fading movie star in the drama There Must Be a Pony (1986), and a character based on Poker Alice in the eponymous Western (1987). She reunited with director Franco Zeffirelli to appear in his French-Italian biopic Young Toscanini (1988), and had the last starring role of her career in a television adaptation of Sweet Bird of Youth (1989), her fourth Tennessee Williams play. During this time, she also began receiving honorary awards for her career – the Cecil B. DeMille Award in 1985, and the Film Society of Lincoln Center's Chaplin Award in 1986.

In the 1990s, Taylor focused her time on HIV/AIDS activism. Her few acting roles included characters in the animated series Captain Planet and the Planeteers (1992) and The Simpsons (1992, 1993), and cameos in four CBS series – The Nanny, Can't Hurry Love, Murphy Brown, and High Society – all airing on February 26, 1996, to promote her new fragrance.

Her last theatrically released film was the critically panned, but commercially successful, The Flintstones (1994), in which she played Pearl Slaghoople in a brief supporting role. Taylor received American and British honors for her career: the AFI Life Achievement Award in 1993, the Screen Actors Guild honorary award in 1997, and a BAFTA Fellowship in 1999. In 2000, she was appointed a Dame Commander in the chivalric Order of the British Empire in the millennium New Year Honours List by Queen Elizabeth II. After supporting roles in the television film These Old Broads (2001) and in the animated sitcom God, the Devil and Bob (2001), Taylor announced that she was retiring from acting to devote her time to philanthropy. She gave one last public performance in 2007, when she performed the play Love Letters at an AIDS benefit at the Paramount Studios with James Earl Jones.

== Other ventures ==
=== HIV/AIDS activism ===
Taylor was one of the first celebrities to participate in HIV/AIDS activism and helped to raise more than $270 million for the cause beginning in the mid-1980s. She began her philanthropic work after becoming frustrated with the fact that very little was being done to combat the disease despite the media attention. She later explained for Vanity Fair that she "decided that with my name, I could open certain doors, that I was a commodity in myself – and I'm not talking as an actress. I could take the fame I'd resented and tried to get away from for so many years – but you can never get away from it – and use it to do some good. I wanted to retire, but the tabloids wouldn't let me. So, I thought: If you're going to screw me over, I'll use you."

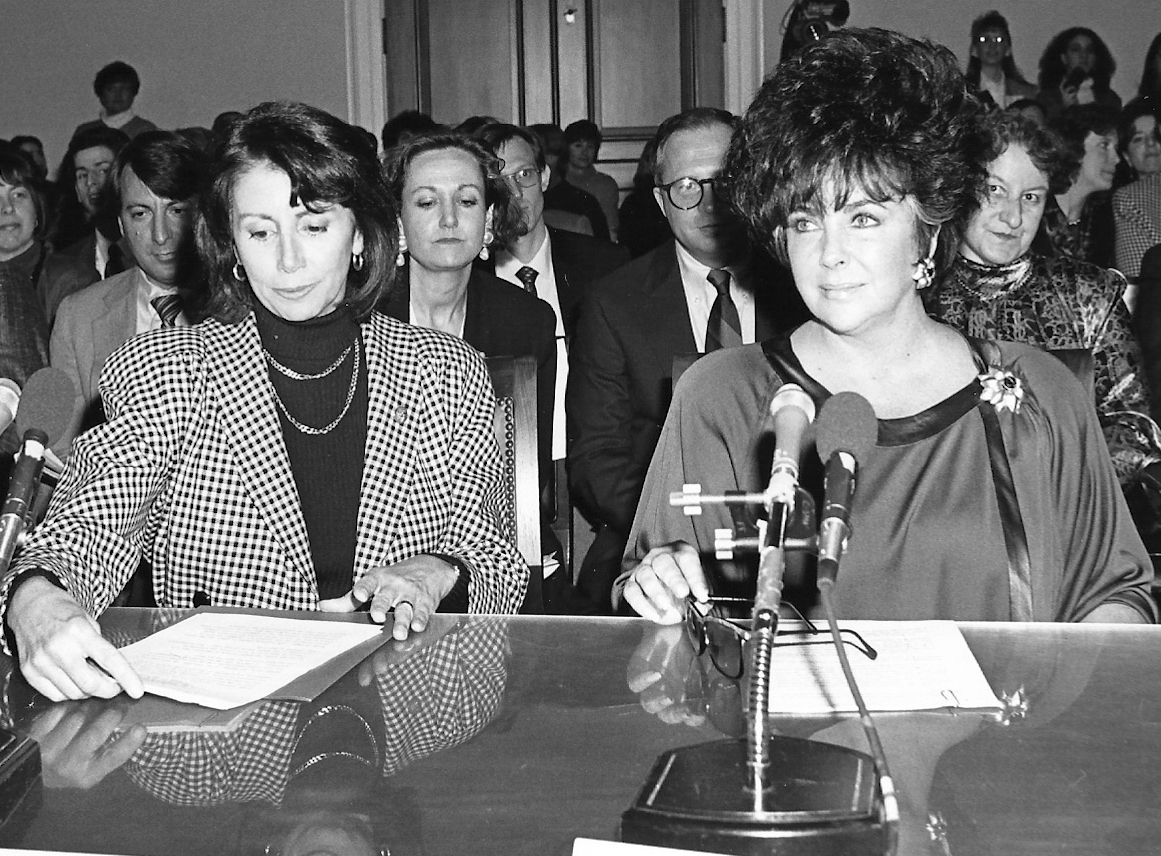
Congresswoman Nancy Pelosi (left) with Taylor (right), who is testifying in 1990 before the House Budget Committee on HIV-AIDS Funding

Taylor began her philanthropic efforts in 1984, helping to organize and by hosting the first AIDS fundraiser to benefit the AIDS Project Los Angeles. In August 1985, she and Michael Gottlieb founded the National AIDS Research Foundation after her friend and former co-star Rock Hudson announced that he was dying of the disease. The following month, the foundation merged with Mathilde Krim's AIDS foundation to form the American Foundation for AIDS Research (amfAR). As amfAR's focus is on research funding, Taylor founded the Elizabeth Taylor AIDS Foundation (ETAF) in 1991 to raise awareness and to provide support services for people with HIV/AIDS, paying for its overhead costs herself. Since her death, her estate has continued to fund ETAF's work and donates 25% of royalties from the use of her image and likeness to the foundation. In addition to her work for people affected by HIV/AIDS in the United States, Taylor was instrumental in expanding amfAR's operations to other countries; ETAF also operates internationally.

Taylor testified before the Senate and House for the Ryan White Care Act in 1986, 1990, and 1992. She persuaded President Ronald Reagan to acknowledge the disease for the first time in a speech in 1987, and she publicly criticized presidents George H. W. Bush and Bill Clinton for lack of interest in combatting the disease. Taylor also founded the Elizabeth Taylor Medical Center to offer free HIV/AIDS testing and care at the Whitman-Walker Clinic in Washington, DC, and the Elizabeth Taylor Endowment Fund for the UCLA Clinical AIDS Research and Education Center in Los Angeles. In 2015, Taylor's business partner Kathy Ireland claimed that Taylor ran an illegal "underground network" that distributed medications to Americans suffering from HIV/AIDS during the 1980s, when the Food and Drug Administration had not yet approved them. The claim was challenged by several people, including amfAR's former vice-president for development and external affairs, Taylor's former publicist, and activists who were involved in Project Inform in the 1980s and 1990s.

Taylor was honored with several awards for her philanthropic work. She was made a Knight of the French Legion of Honour in 1987, and received the Jean Hersholt Humanitarian Award in 1993, the Screen Actors' Guild Lifetime Achievement Award for Humanitarian service in 1997, the GLAAD Vanguard Award in 2000, and the Presidential Citizens Medal in 2001.

=== Jewelry and fashion brands ===
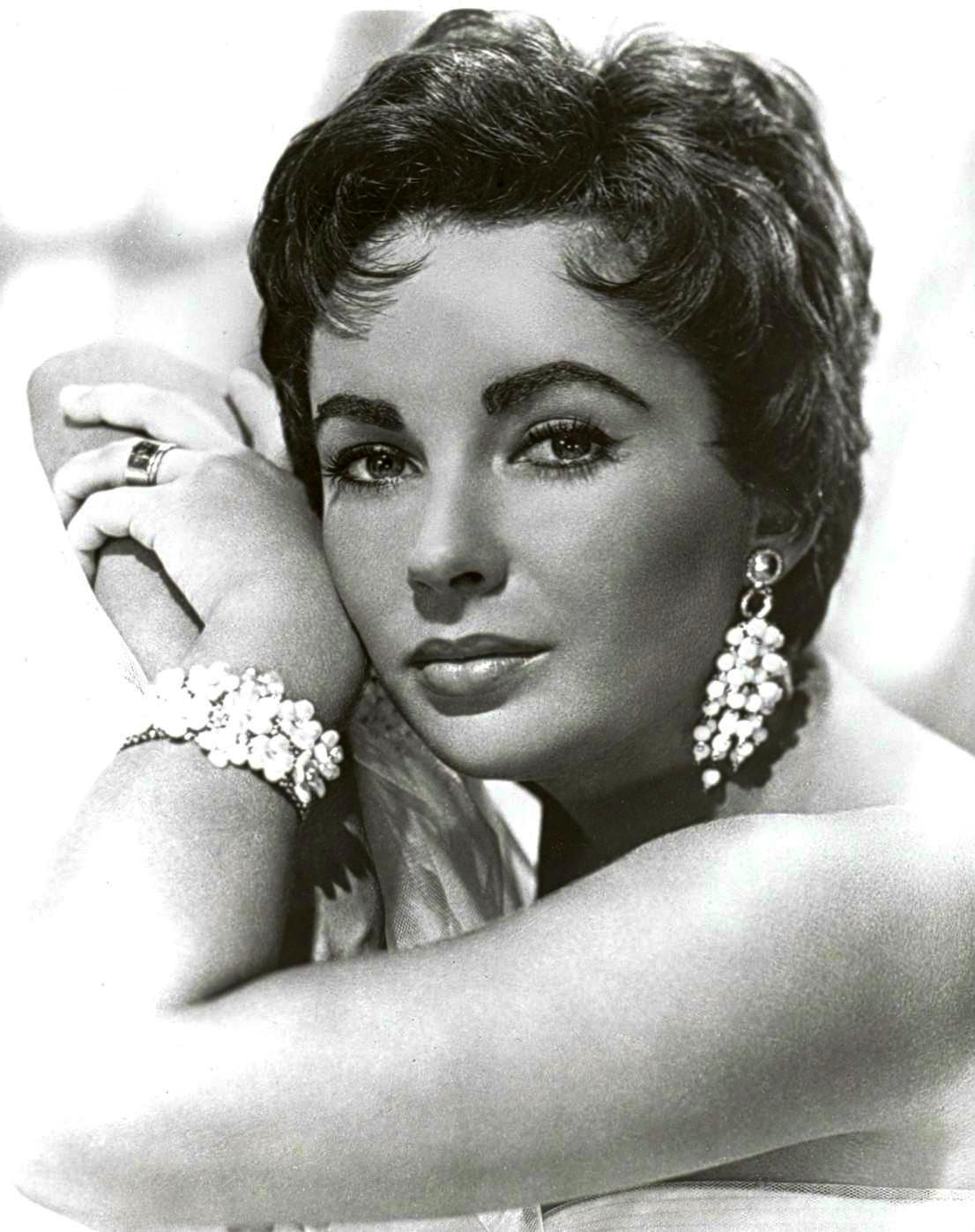
Taylor in a studio publicity photo in 1953

Taylor is a fashion icon both for her film costumes and personal style. At MGM, her costumes were mostly designed by Helen Rose and Edith Head, and in the 1960s by Irene Sharaff. Her most famous costumes include a white ball gown in A Place in the Sun (1951), a Grecian dress in Cat on a Hot Tin Roof (1958), a green A-line dress in Suddenly Last Summer (1959), and a slip and a fur coat in BUtterfield 8 (1960). Her look in Cleopatra (1963) started a trend for "cat-eye" makeup done with black eyeliner.

Taylor collected jewelry through her life. She owned the 33.19-carat (6.638 g) Krupp Diamond, the 69.42-carat (13.884 g) Taylor–Burton Diamond, and the 50-carat (10 g) La Peregrina Pearl, all three of which were gifts from husband Richard Burton. She also published a book about her collection, My Love Affair with Jewelry, in 2002. Taylor helped to popularise the work of fashion designers Valentino Garavani and Halston. She received a Lifetime of Glamour Award from the Council of Fashion Designers of America (CFDA) in 1997. After her death, her jewelry and fashion collections were auctioned by Christie's to benefit her AIDS foundation, ETAF. The jewelry sold for a record-breaking sum of $156.8 million, and the clothes and accessories for a further $5.5 million.

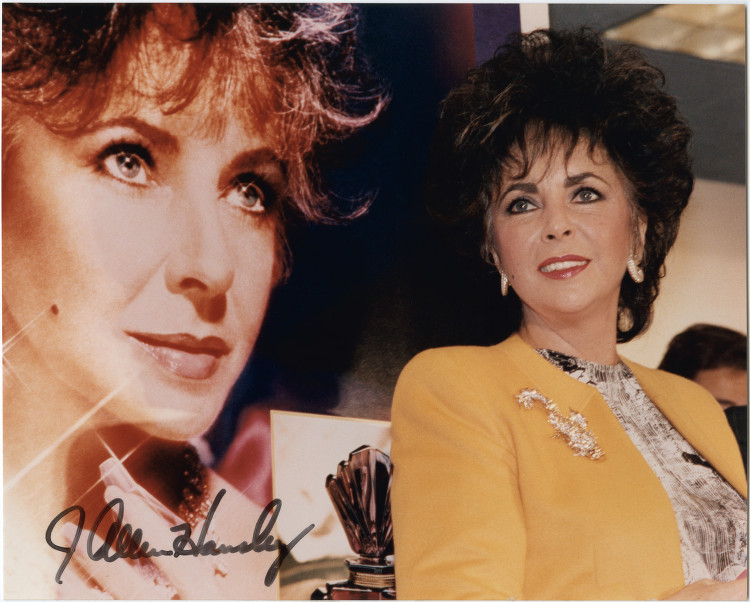
Taylor promoting her first fragrance, Passion, in 1987

Taylor created a collection of fragrances whose success helped establish the trend of celebrity-branded perfumes in her later years. In collaboration with Elizabeth Arden, Inc., she began by launching two best-selling perfumes – Passion in 1987, and White Diamonds in 1991. Taylor personally supervised the creation and production of each of the 11 fragrances marketed in her name. According to biographers Sam Kashner and Nancy Schoenberger, she earned more money through the fragrance collection than during her entire acting career, and upon her death, the British newspaper The Guardian estimated that the majority of her estimated $600 million–$1 billion estate consisted of revenue from fragrances. In 2005, Taylor also founded a jewelry company, House of Taylor, in collaboration with Kathy Ireland and Jack and Monty Abramov.

== Personal life ==
=== Marriages, relationships, and children ===
Throughout her career, Taylor's personal life was the subject of constant media attention. She was married eight times to seven men, had four children, converted to Judaism, and endured several serious illnesses. According to biographer Alexander Walker, "Whether she liked it or not ... marriage is the matrix of the myth that began surrounding Elizabeth Taylor from [when she was sixteen]." In 1948, MGM arranged for her to date American football champion Glenn Davis, and she announced plans to marry him once he returned from Korea. The following year, Taylor was briefly engaged to William Pawley Jr., son of US ambassador William D. Pawley. Film tycoon Howard Hughes also wanted to marry her and offered to pay her parents a six-figure sum if she agreed. Taylor declined but was eager to marry young, as her "rather puritanical upbringing and beliefs" made her believe that "love was synonymous with marriage." She later described herself as "emotionally immature" during this time, due to her sheltered childhood, and believed she could gain independence from her parents and MGM through marriage.

Taylor was 18 years old when she married Conrad "Nicky" Hilton Jr., heir to the Hilton Hotels chain, at the Church of the Good Shepherd in Beverly Hills on May 6, 1950. MGM organized the large and expensive wedding, which became a major media event. In the weeks after the wedding, Taylor realized she had made a mistake; they had few interests in common, and Hilton was abusive and a heavy drinker. Taylor suffered a miscarriage during one of his violent outbursts. She announced their separation on December 14, 1950, and was granted a divorce on the grounds of mental cruelty on January 29, 1951, eight months after their wedding.

Taylor married her second husband, British actor Michael Wilding, in a low-key ceremony at Caxton Hall in London on February 21, 1952. She had first met him in 1948 while filming The Conspirator in England, and their relationship began when she returned to film Ivanhoe in 1951. Taylor found their age gap appealing. She wanted "the calm and quiet and security of friendship" from the relationship; he hoped the marriage would aid his career in Hollywood. They had two sons: Michael Howard (born January 6, 1953) and Christopher Edward (born February 27, 1955, Taylor's 23rd birthday). As Taylor grew older and more confident, she began to drift apart from Wilding, whose failing career also caused marital strife. When she was away filming Giant in 1955, gossip magazine Confidential caused a scandal by claiming he had entertained strippers at their home. Taylor and Wilding announced their separation on July 18, 1956, and divorced on January 26, 1957.

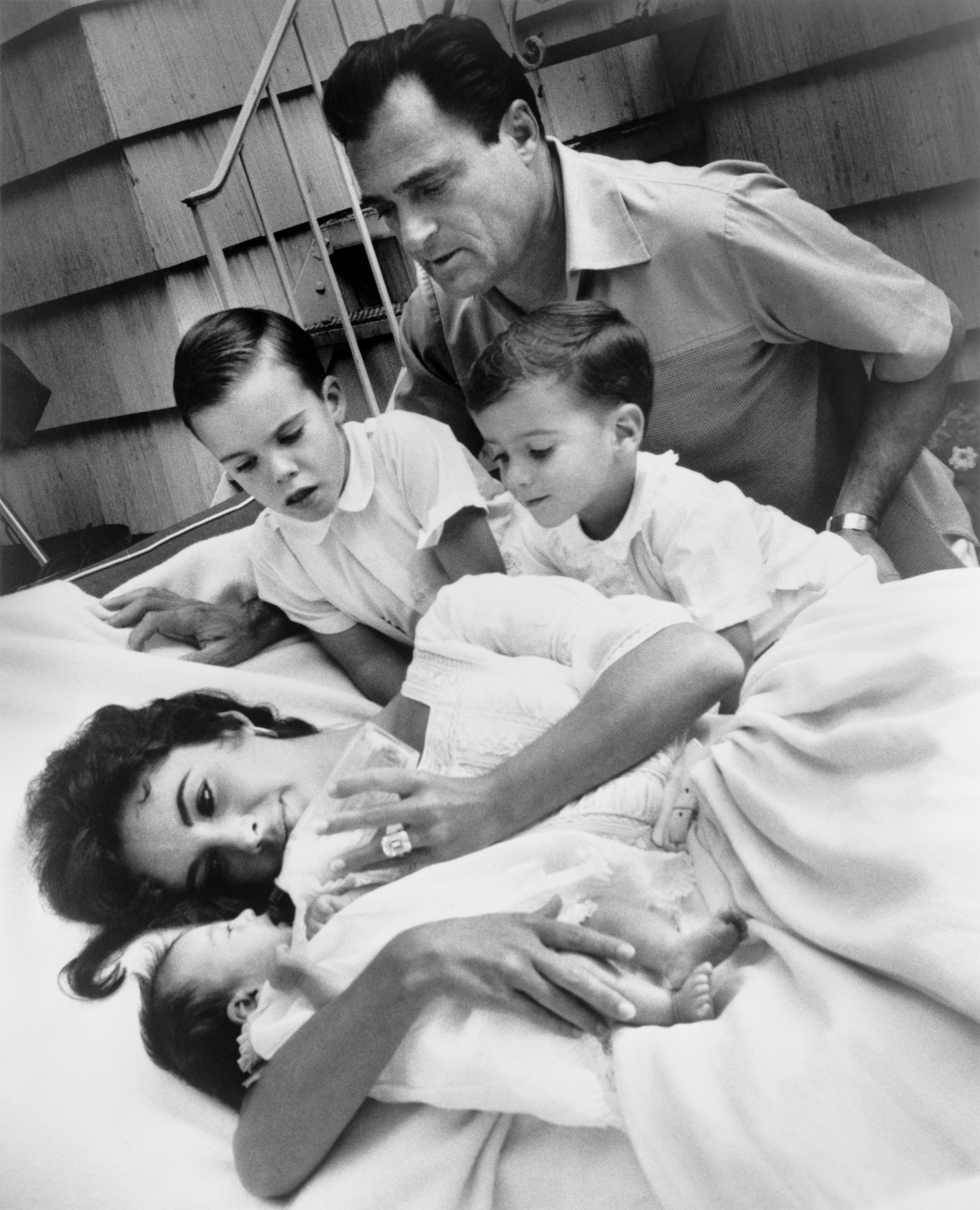
Taylor with her third husband Mike Todd and her three children in 1957

Taylor was three months pregnant when she married her third husband, theatre and film producer Mike Todd, in Acapulco, Guerrero, Mexico, on February 2, 1957. They had one daughter, Elizabeth "Liza" Frances (born August 6, 1957). Todd, known for publicity stunts, encouraged media attention to their marriage; in June 1957, he threw a birthday party at Madison Square Garden attended by 18,000 guests and broadcast on CBS. His death in a plane crash on March 22, 1958, left Taylor devastated. She was comforted by Eddie Fisher, a friend of Todd's and hers, and soon began an affair with him. Fisher was still married to actress Debbie Reynolds, one of Taylor's closest friends. The affair resulted in a public scandal, with Taylor branded a "homewrecker." Taylor and Fisher were married at the Temple Beth Sholom in Las Vegas on May 12, 1959; she later stated she married him only due to her grief. Taylor and Reynolds reconciled in the 1960s.

While filming Cleopatra in Italy in 1962, Taylor began an affair with her co-star, Welsh actor Richard Burton, who was also married. Rumors circulated in the press and were confirmed by a paparazzi photograph of them on a yacht in Ischia. According to sociologist Ellis Cashmore, the publication of the photograph was a "turning point", beginning a new era in which celebrities struggled to keep their personal lives separate from their public images. The scandal led the Vatican to condemn Taylor and Burton for "erotic vagrancy", with calls in the US Congress to bar them from re-entering the country. Taylor was granted a divorce from Fisher on March 5, 1964, in Puerto Vallarta, Jalisco, Mexico, and married Burton ten days later in a private ceremony at the Ritz-Carlton Montreal. Burton subsequently adopted Liza Todd and Maria McKeown (born 1961), a German orphan whose adoption process Taylor had begun while married to Fisher.

Dubbed "Liz and Dick" by the media, Taylor and Burton starred together in eleven films and led a jet-set lifestyle, spending millions on "furs, diamonds, paintings, designer clothes, travel, food, liquor, a yacht, and a jet." Sociologist Karen Sternheimer states that they "became a cottage industry of speculation about their alleged life of excess. From reports of massive spending [...] affairs, and even an open marriage, the couple came to represent a new era of 'gotcha' celebrity coverage, where the more personal the story, the better." After divorcing for the first time in June 1974, they reconciled and remarried in Kasane, Botswana, on October 10, 1975. The second marriage lasted less than a year and ended in divorce in July 1976. Taylor and Burton's relationship was often referred to as the "marriage of the century" by the media, and she later stated, "After Richard, the men in my life were just there to hold the coat, to open the door. All the men after Richard were really just company." Soon after her final divorce from Burton, Taylor met her sixth husband, John Warner, a Republican politician from Virginia. They were married on December 4, 1976, after which Taylor focused on working for his electoral campaign. Once Warner had been elected to the Senate, she found life as a politician's wife in Washington, D.C., boring and lonely; she became depressed, gained weight, and became increasingly addicted to prescription drugs and alcohol. Taylor and Warner separated in December 1981 and divorced on November 5, 1982.

After the divorce from Warner, Taylor dated actors Anthony Geary and George Hamilton, and was engaged to Mexican lawyer Victor Luna in 1983–1984, and New York businessman Dennis Stein in 1985. She met her seventh and last husband, construction worker Larry Fortensky, at the Betty Ford Center in 1988. They were married at the Neverland Ranch of her close friend Michael Jackson on October 6, 1991. The wedding attracted intense media attention, with one photographer parachuting onto the ranch, and Taylor sold the wedding pictures to People for $1 million (equivalent to $2.36 million in 2025), which she used to start her AIDS foundation. Taylor and Fortensky divorced on October 31, 1996, but remained in contact for life. She attributed the split to her painful hip operations and his obsessive-compulsive disorder. In the winter of 1999, Fortensky underwent brain surgery after falling off a balcony and was comatose for six weeks; Taylor immediately notified the hospital she would personally guarantee his medical expenses. At the end of 2010, she wrote him a letter that read: "You're a part of my life that cannot be carved out nor do I ever wish it to be." Taylor's last phone call with Fortensky was on February 7, 2011, one day before she checked into the hospital for what became her final stay. He told her she would outlive him. Although they had been divorced for almost 15 years, Taylor left Fortensky $825,000 in her will.

In the last years of her life, she had a platonic friendship with actor Colin Farrell. On the phone, they often talked about insomnia and how to deal with it.

=== Judaism ===
Taylor was raised as a Christian Scientist and converted to Judaism (Reform Branch) in 1959. Although two of her husbands – Mike Todd and Eddie Fisher – were Jewish, Taylor stated that she did not convert because of them, and had wanted to do so "for a long time", and that there was "comfort and dignity and hope for me in this ancient religion that [has] survived for four thousand years. ... I feel as if I have been a Jew all my life." Walker believed that Taylor was influenced in her decision by her godfather, Victor Cazalet, and her mother, who were active supporters of Zionism during her childhood.

Following her conversion, Taylor became an active supporter of Jewish and Zionist causes. In 1959, she purchased $100,000 worth of Israeli bonds, which led to her films being banned by Arab countries throughout the Middle East and Africa. She was also barred from entering Egypt to film Cleopatra in 1962, but the ban was lifted two years later after the Egyptian officials deemed that the film brought positive publicity for the country. In addition to purchasing bonds, Taylor helped to raise money for organizations such as the Jewish National Fund, and sat on the board of trustees of the Simon Wiesenthal Center.

Taylor also advocated for the right of Soviet Jews to emigrate to Israel, cancelled a visit to the USSR because of its condemnation of Israel due to the Six-Day War, and signed a letter protesting the United Nations General Assembly Resolution 3379 of 1975. In 1976, she offered herself as a replacement hostage after more than 100 Israeli civilians were taken hostage in the Entebbe skyjacking. She had a small role in the television film made about the incident, Victory at Entebbe (1976), and narrated Genocide (1981), an Academy Award-winning documentary about the Holocaust.

=== Illness and death ===
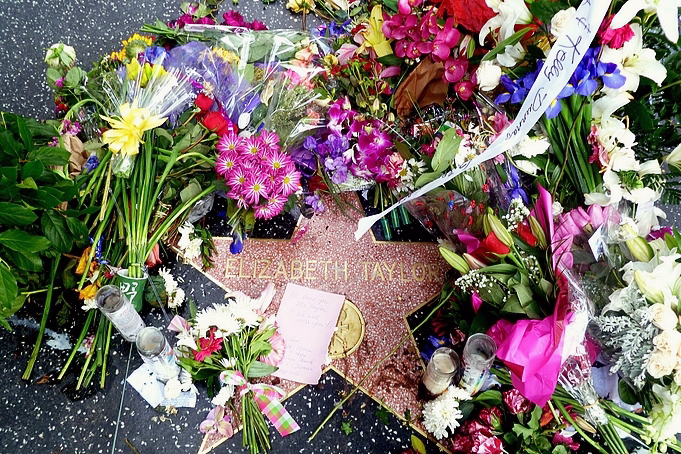
Flowers were placed on Taylor's star on the Hollywood Walk of Fame after she died in 2011

Taylor struggled with health problems for most of her life. She was born with scoliosis and broke her back while filming National Velvet in 1944. The fracture went undetected for several years, although it caused chronic back problems. In 1956, she underwent an operation in which some of her spinal discs were removed and replaced with donated bone. Taylor was also prone to other illnesses and injuries that often required surgery; in 1961, she survived a near‑fatal bout of pneumonia that required a tracheotomy. She was treated for the pneumonia with bacteriophage.

In 1968, she underwent an emergency hysterectomy, which exacerbated her back problems and contributed to hip problems. She became addicted to alcohol and prescription painkillers and tranquilizers, for which she was treated at the Betty Ford Center for seven weeks from December 1983 to January 1984, becoming the first celebrity to openly admit herself to the clinic. She relapsed later in the decade and entered rehabilitation again in 1988. Taylor had gained weight by the 1970s, especially after her marriage to Senator John Warner. Her weight gain was eventually between 70 and 90lbs, at the time a size 20 dress. She later published a diet book about her experiences, Elizabeth Takes Off (1988). Taylor was a heavy smoker until she experienced a severe bout of pneumonia in 1990. According to her ex-cousin-in-law Sandra Souza, Taylor was still smoking menthol cigarettes in 1995.

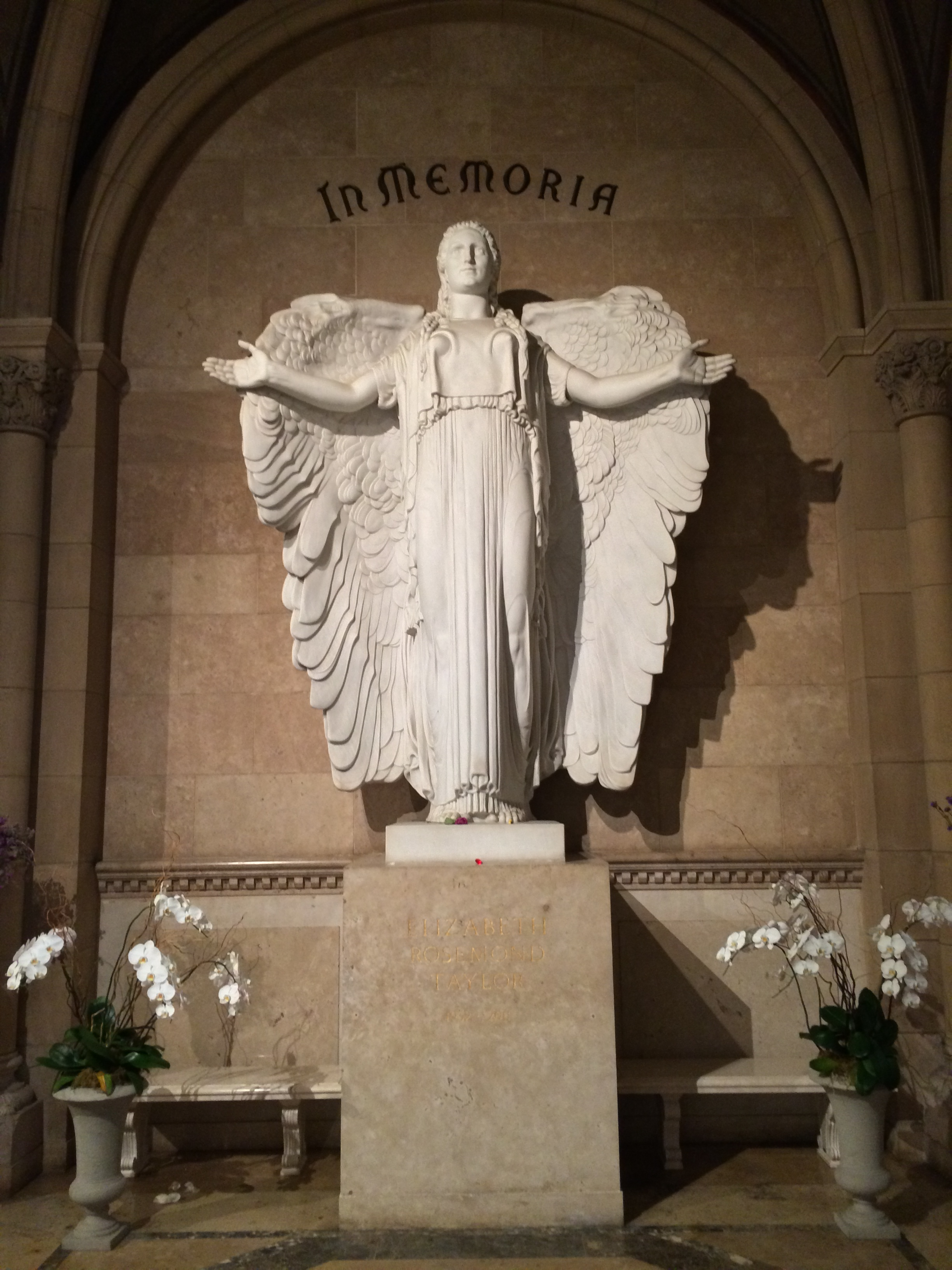
Taylor's grave at the Great Mausoleum of the Forest Lawn Memorial Park

Taylor's health increasingly declined during the last two decades of her life, and she rarely attended public events after 1996. She had serious bouts of pneumonia in 1990 and 2000, two hip replacement surgeries in the mid-1990s, surgery for a benign brain tumor in 1997, and successful treatment for skin cancer in 2002. She used a wheelchair due to her back problems and was diagnosed with congestive heart failure in 2004. She died of the illness at Cedars-Sinai Medical Center in Los Angeles on March 23, 2011, at age 79, six weeks after being hospitalized. Her funeral took place the following day at Forest Lawn Memorial Park in Glendale, California. The service was a private Jewish ceremony presided over by Rabbi Jerome Cutler. At Taylor's request, the ceremony began 15 minutes behind schedule, as, according to her representative, "She even wanted to be late for her own funeral." She was entombed in the cemetery's Great Mausoleum.

=== Los Angeles residence ===
Taylor lived at 700 Nimes Road in the Bel Air district of Los Angeles from 1982 until her death in 2011. The art photographer Catherine Opie created an eponymous photographic study of the house in 2011.

== Legacy ==
More than anyone else I can think of, Elizabeth Taylor represents the complete movie phenomenon – what movies are as an art and an industry, and what they have meant to those of us who have grown up watching them in the dark... Like movies themselves, she's grown up with us, as we have with her. She's someone whose entire life has been played in a series of settings forever denied the fourth wall. Elizabeth Taylor is the most important character she's ever played.

— Vincent Canby, The New York Times, 1986

Taylor was one of the last stars of classical Hollywood cinema and one of the first modern celebrities. During the era of the studio system, she exemplified the classic film star. She was portrayed as different from "ordinary" people, and her public image was carefully crafted and controlled by MGM. When the era of classical Hollywood ended in the 1960s, and paparazzi photography became a normal feature of media culture, Taylor came to define a new type of celebrity whose real private life was the focus of public interest. "More than for any film role," Adam Bernstein of The Washington Post wrote, "she became famous for being famous, setting a media template for later generations of entertainers, models, and all variety of semi-somebodies."

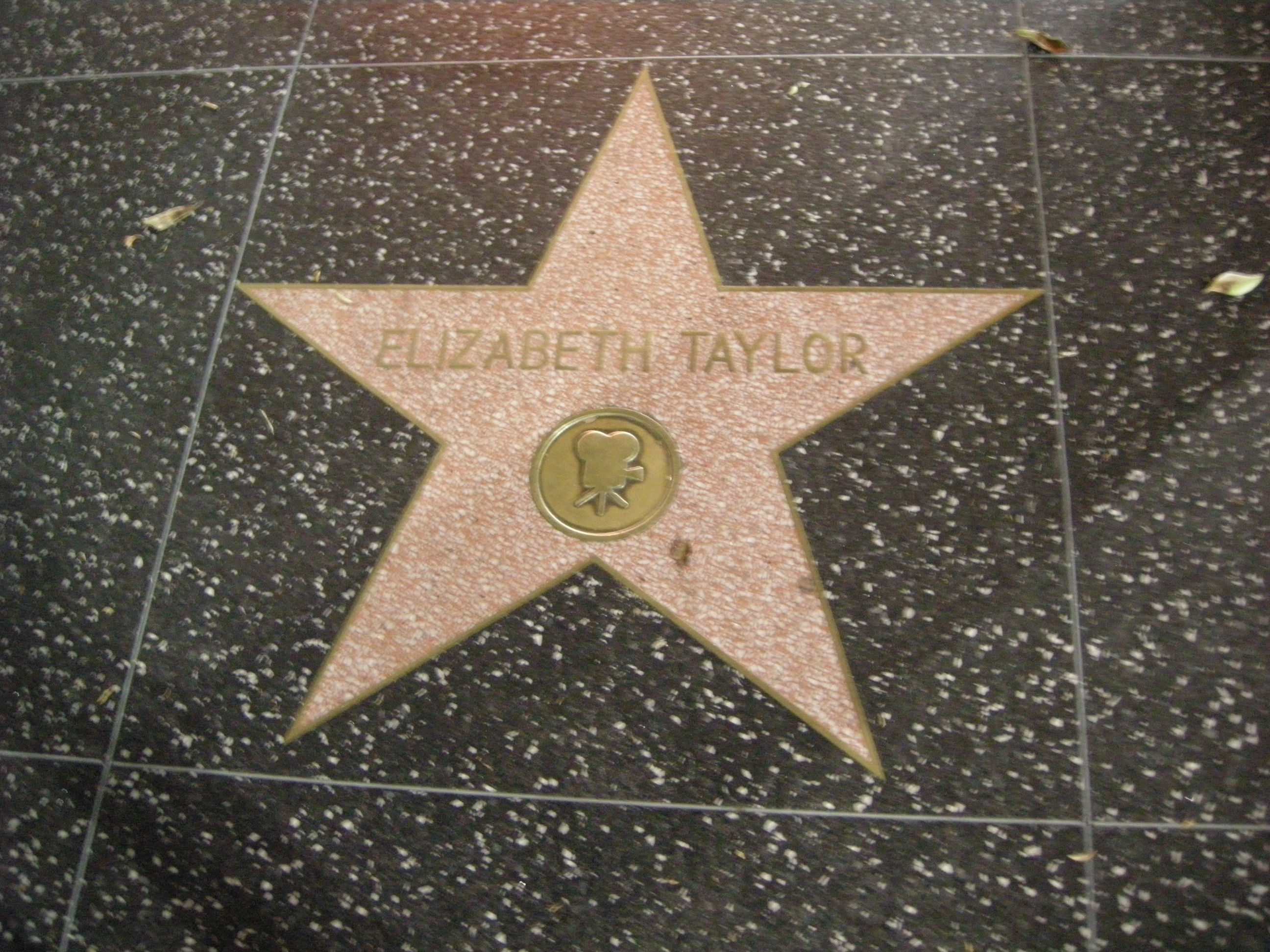
Taylor's star on the Hollywood Walk of Fame

Regardless of the acting awards she won during her career, Taylor's film performances were often overlooked by contemporary critics; according to film historian Jeanine Basinger, "No actress ever had a more difficult job in getting critics to accept her onscreen as someone other than Elizabeth Taylor... Her persona ate her alive." Her film roles often mirrored her personal life, and many critics continue to regard her as always playing herself, rather than acting. In contrast, Mel Gussow of The New York Times stated that "the range of [Taylor's] acting was surprisingly wide", despite the fact that she never received any professional training. Film critic Peter Bradshaw called her "an actress of such sexiness it was an incitement to riot – sultry and queenly at the same time", and "a shrewd, intelligent, intuitive acting presence in her later years." David Thomson stated that "she had the range, nerve, and instinct that only Bette Davis had had before – and like Davis, Taylor was monster and empress, sweetheart and scold, idiot and wise woman." Five films in which she starred – Lassie Come Home, National Velvet, A Place in the Sun, Giant, and Who's Afraid of Virginia Woolf? – have been preserved in the National Film Registry, and the American Film Institute has named her the seventh greatest female screen legend.

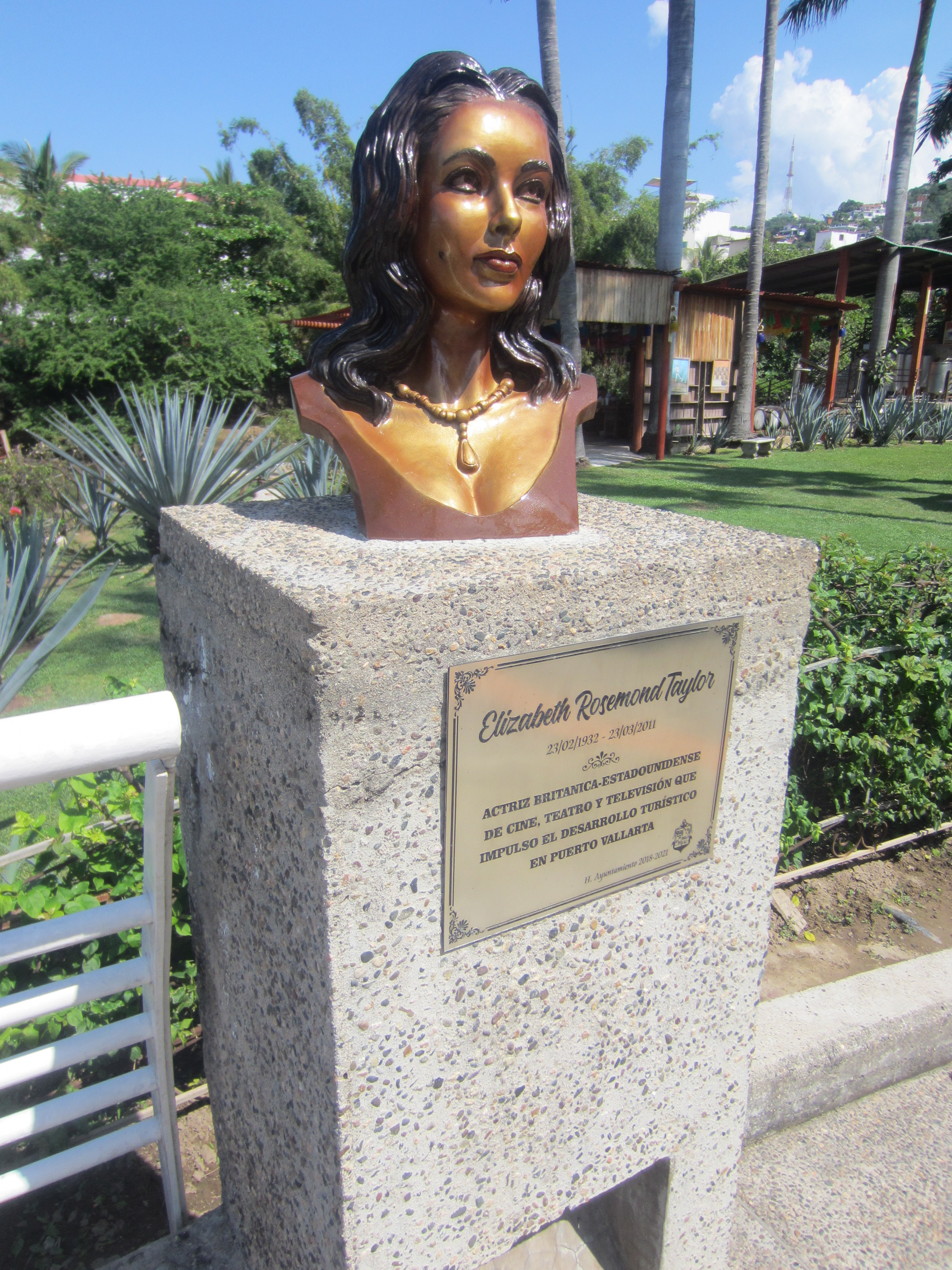
Bust of Taylor in Puerto Vallarta, Mexico

Taylor has also been discussed by journalists and scholars interested in the role of women in Western society. Camille Paglia writes that Taylor was a "pre-feminist woman" who "wields the sexual power that feminism cannot explain and has tried to destroy. Through stars like Taylor, we sense the world-disordering impact of legendary women like Delilah, Salome, and Helen of Troy." In contrast, cultural critic M.G. Lord calls Taylor an "accidental feminist", stating that while she did not identify as a feminist, many of her films had feminist themes and "introduced a broad audience to feminist ideas." (Note: For example, National Velvet (1944) was about a girl attempting to compete in the Grand National despite gender discrimination; A Place in the Sun (1951) is "a cautionary tale from a time before women had ready access to birth control"; her character in BUtterfield 8 (1960) is shown in control of her sexuality; Who's Afraid of Virginia Woolf? (1966) "depicts the anguish that befalls a woman when the only way she can express herself is through her husband's stalled career and children".) Similarly, Ben W. Heineman Jr. and Cristine Russell write in The Atlantic that her role in Giant "dismantled stereotypes about women and minorities."

Taylor is considered a gay icon and received widespread recognition for her HIV/AIDS activism. After her death, GLAAD issued a statement saying that she "was an icon not only in Hollywood, but in the LGBT community, where she worked to ensure that everyone was treated with the respect and dignity we all deserve", and Sir Nick Partridge of the Terrence Higgins Trust called her "the first major star to publicly fight fear and prejudice towards AIDS." According to Paul Flynn of The Guardian, she was "a new type of gay icon, one whose position is based not on tragedy, but on her work for the LGBTQ community." Speaking of her charity work, former President Bill Clinton said at her death, "Elizabeth's legacy will live on in many people around the world whose lives will be longer and better because of her work and the ongoing efforts of those she inspired."

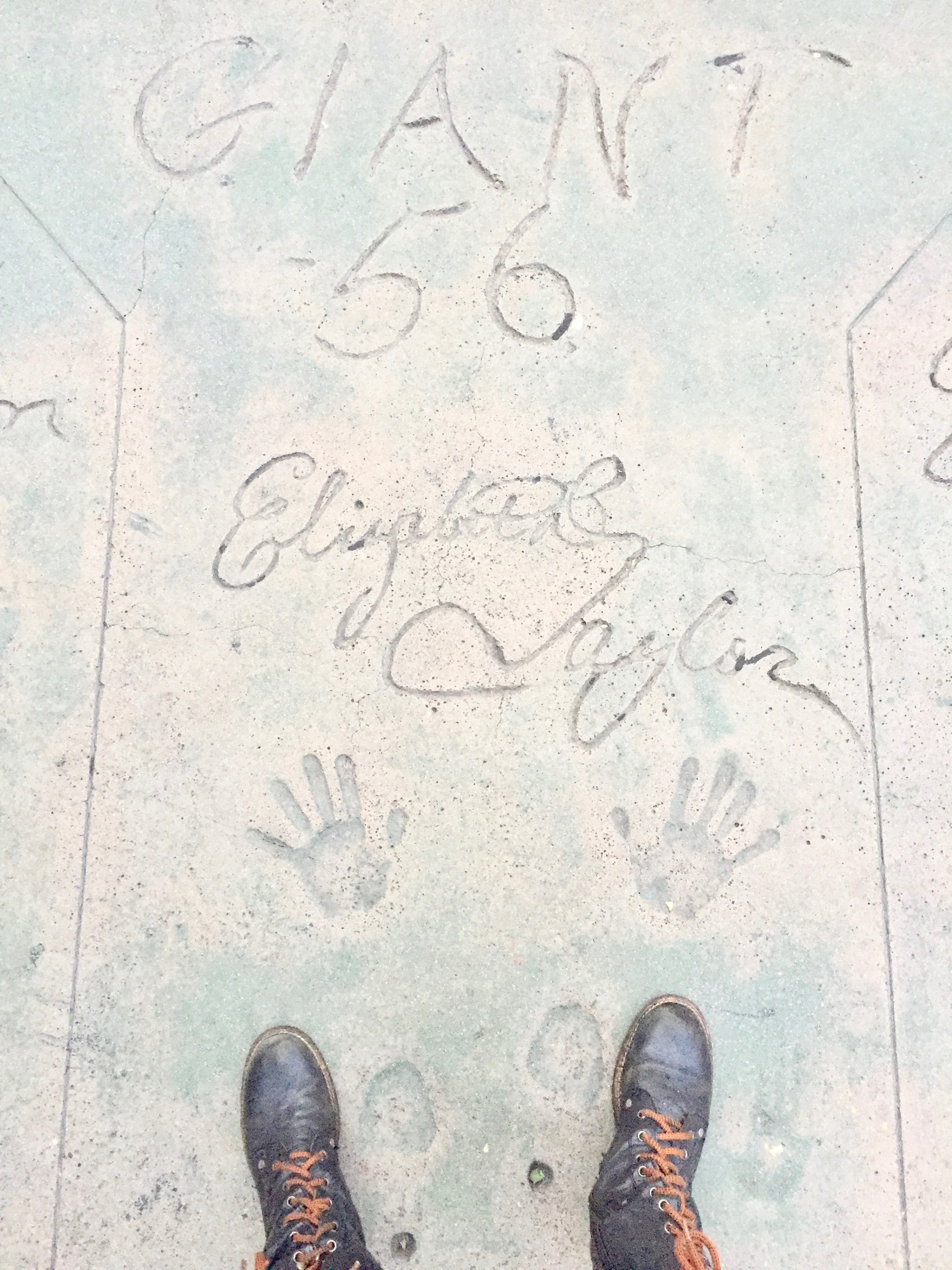
Taylor's signature, handprints, and footprints in the concrete in front of Grauman's Chinese Theatre in Los Angeles

Since Taylor's death, House of Taylor, Elizabeth Taylor's estate, has preserved Taylor's legacy through content, partnerships, and products. The estate is managed by three trustees selected by Elizabeth prior to her death. They continue to be involved with The Elizabeth Taylor AIDS Foundation and oversee The Elizabeth Taylor Archive. In 2022, House of Taylor released Elizabeth The First, a 10-part podcast series with Imperative Entertainment and Kitty Purry Productions and narrated by Katy Perry. In December 2022, Elizabeth Taylor: The Grit & Glamour of an Icon by Kate Andersen Brower, the first Elizabeth Taylor biography authorized by the estate, was released.

In 2019, it was announced that Rachel Weisz would portray Taylor in A Special Relationship, an upcoming film about Taylor's journey from actress to activist written by Simon Beaufoy. In 2024, it was announced that Kim Kardashian would executive produce and feature in a docuseries about Taylor. Commissioned by the BBC, it was given the working title Elizabeth Taylor: Rebel Superstar.

The second track of the American singer-songwriter Taylor Swift's twelfth studio album, The Life of a Showgirl (2025), is titled after Taylor. Swift said that she decided to write a song inspired by Taylor after watching an online video in which Taylor's son said that if he were to choose a person to compare his mother with in terms of popularity and "chaos", it would be Swift. Swift had already made a reference to Taylor's relationship with Richard Burton on the single "...Ready for It?" from her 2017 album Reputation.
