= X Y & Zee =

1972 British drama film

- Theatrical release poster
- Directed by: Brian G. Hutton
- Written by: Edna O'Brien
- Produced by: Elliot Kastner; Jay Kanter; Alan Ladd, Jr.
- Starring: Elizabeth Taylor; Michael Caine; Susannah York
- Cinematography: Billy Williams
- Edited by: Jim Clark
- Music by: Stanley Myers
- Production company: Zee Company
- Distributed by: Columbia Pictures
- Release dates: 24 February 1972 (UK); 21 January 1972 (USA)
- Running time: 108 minutes
- Country: United Kingdom
- Language: English

X Y & Zee (also known as Zee and Co. and Zee and Company) is a 1972 British drama film directed by Brian G. Hutton and starring Elizabeth Taylor, Michael Caine, and Susannah York. Released by Columbia Pictures, it was based upon a novel by Edna O'Brien. The screenplay concerns a middle-aged, bickering couple whose marriage is near its end, and the woman who comes between them.

== Plot ==
Zee Blakely is a 40-something socialite, whose marriage to her architect husband Robert is on the rocks, as witnessed by their frequent verbal sparring matches. Tiring of the situation, Robert is drawn to quiet boutique owner Stella who is the complete antithesis to Zee in terms of personality.

Feeling bored and rejected, Zee makes several attempts to regain Robert's attention, including attempting suicide, but these do not work. Zee deduces that Stella may have had a lesbian affair in the past, and uses this against both her and Robert and then dares him to partake in a love triangle with Stella.

== Cast ==
- Elizabeth Taylor as Zee Blakeley
- Michael Caine as Robert Blakeley
- Susannah York as Stella
- Margaret Leighton as Gladys
- John Standing as Gordon
- Mary Larkin as Rita
- Michael Cashman as Gavin
- Gino Melvazzi as Head Waiter

== Production ==
=== Filming ===
X Y & Zee was shot at Shepperton Studios and on location in London. The film's sets were designed by the art director Peter Mullins. Caine claimed decades later that Elizabeth Taylor was paid ten times more than he was for the film.

== Critical reception ==
Critical opinions of the film were varied. Roger Ebert wrote that while the movie is "no masterpiece" it still satisfies audiences as it "unzips along at a nice, vulgar clip". He said that Elizabeth Taylor is the film's main attraction, but the emphasis upon her detracts somewhat from a fuller representation of the love triangle in the film. Steven Scheuer praised the film for its "intelligent dialogue" and as a "change of pace" for its director. Michael McWilliams cited Taylor's work as "her greatest movie performance" and called the film "outrageously funny" (McWilliams, 1987: 32).

Other critics were less sympathetic. New York Magazine wrote: "The characters played by Elizabeth Taylor, Michael Caine and Susannah York are uniformly repulsive; the style completely vulgar; the dialogue moronic, and the situations simply beyond belief in this triangular affair." Leonard Maltin wrote the film was "contrived [and] often perverse," with the Elizabeth Taylor/Susannah York love scene ranking "high in the annals of poor taste," (Maltin, 1990: 1386). Clive Hirschhorn felt the film was sabotaged by the director's "indulgent" take on it, thereby skewing Edna O'Brien's screenplay to its detriment (Hirshhorn, 1989: 298). Mick Martin offered a very brief review of the film, writing that it was a "pointless tale of sexual relationships", (Martin and Porter, 1996: p. 1213).

== Home media ==
A Region 1 DVD-R was released by Sony Pictures on 17 December 2010.

== Bibliography ==
- Hirschhorn, Clive (1990). The Columbia story (1 ed.). New York: Crown. ISBN 978-0517575581.
- Maltin, Leonard, ed. (1991). Leonard Maltin's movie and video guide (1992 ed.). New York, N.Y.: Signet. ISBN 978-0452266919.
- Martin, Mick; Porter, Marsha (1996). Bang, Derrick (ed.). Video movie guide, 1997. New York: Ballantine Books. ISBN 978-0345406439.
- McWilliams, Michael (1987). TV sirens : a tantalizing look at prime time's fabulous females. New York, NY: Putnam. ISBN 978-0399512926.
