= Frankenheimer =

Frankenheimer is a surname. Notable people with the surname include:

- John Frankenheimer (1930–2002), American film and television director
- Leslie Frankenheimer (1948–2013), American film and television set designer
