= Pierce Brothers Westwood Village Memorial Park and Mortuary =

Cemetery in Los Angeles, California, US

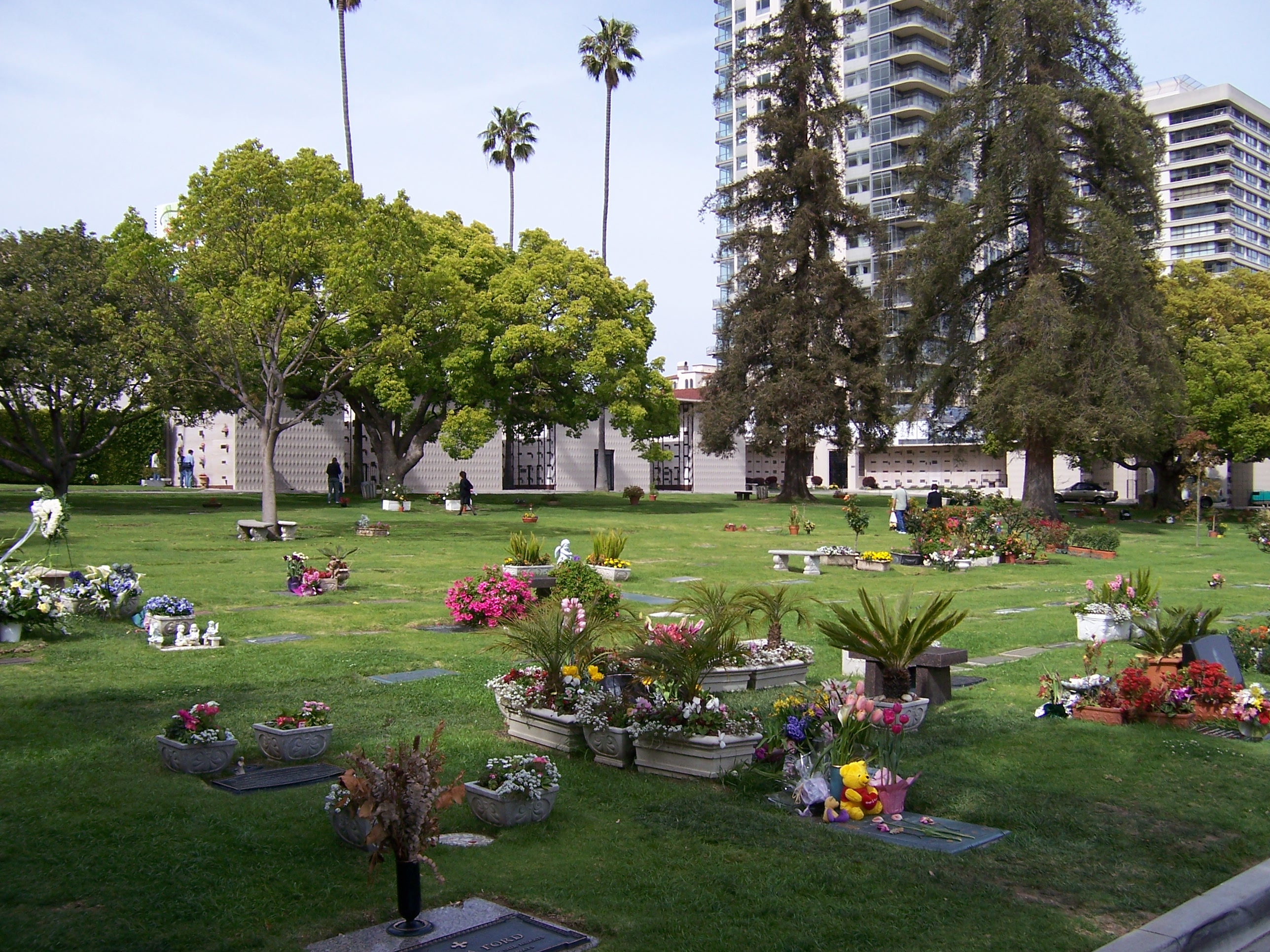
- The memorial park in January 2005
- Interactive map of Pierce Brothers Westwood Village Memorial Park and Mortuary

Details
- Established: 1880s as unnamed cemetery 1905 as Sunset Cemetery; 1926 name officially changed to Westwood Village Memorial Park Cemetery
- Location: 1218 Glendon Avenue; Westwood, Los Angeles 90024
- Country: United States
- Coordinates: 34°03′30″N 118°26′26″W
- Type: Private
- Owned by: Service Corporation International
- Website: pbwvmortuary.com

Los Angeles Historic-Cultural Monument
- Designated: May 16, 2003
- Reference no.: 731

Pierce Brothers Westwood Village Memorial Park and Mortuary is a cemetery and mortuary located in the Westwood area of Los Angeles, California, United States. It includes a crematory for cremation services. Its location is at 1218 Glendon Avenue in Westwood, with an entrance from Glendon Avenue.

This cemetery was established as Sunset Cemetery in 1905, but had been used for burials since the 1880s. In 1926, the name was changed to Westwood Memorial Park and was later renamed to Pierce Brothers Westwood Village Memorial Park & Mortuary.

== Noted interments ==
=== A ===
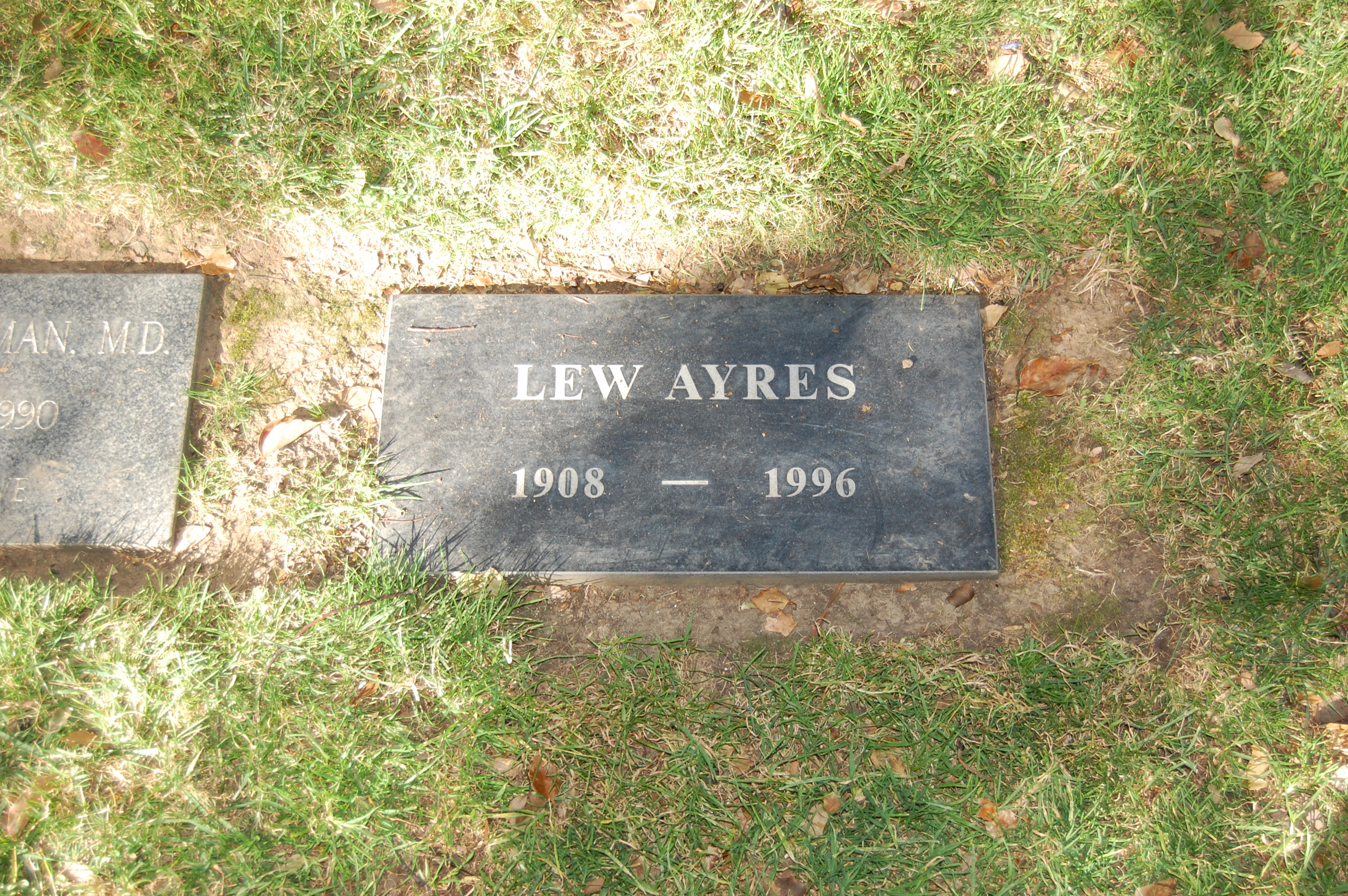
Grave of Lew Ayres

- Kip Addotta (1944–2019), comedian
- Patrick Adiarte (1942-2025), actor
- Milton Ager (1893–1979), musician, composer
- Charles Aidman (1925–1993), actor
- Eddie Albert (1906–2005), actor
- Margo Albert (1917–1985), actress, wife of Eddie Albert
- Shana Alexander (1925–2005), journalist, columnist, television commentator
- Claud Allister (1888–1970), actor
- Gitta Alpár (1903–1991), actress, opera singer
- Richard Anderson (1926–2017), actor, co-star of The Six Million Dollar Man and The Bionic Woman
- Patty Andrews (1918–2013), singer
- Tige Andrews (1920–2007), actor
- Ken Annakin (1914–2009), director
- Eve Arden (1908–1990), actress, comedian
- Jack Arnold (1916–1992), director
- Robert Armstrong (1890–1973), actor
- James Aubrey (1918–1994), producer
- Hy Averback (1920–1997), director
- Lew Ayres (1908–1996), actor

=== B ===
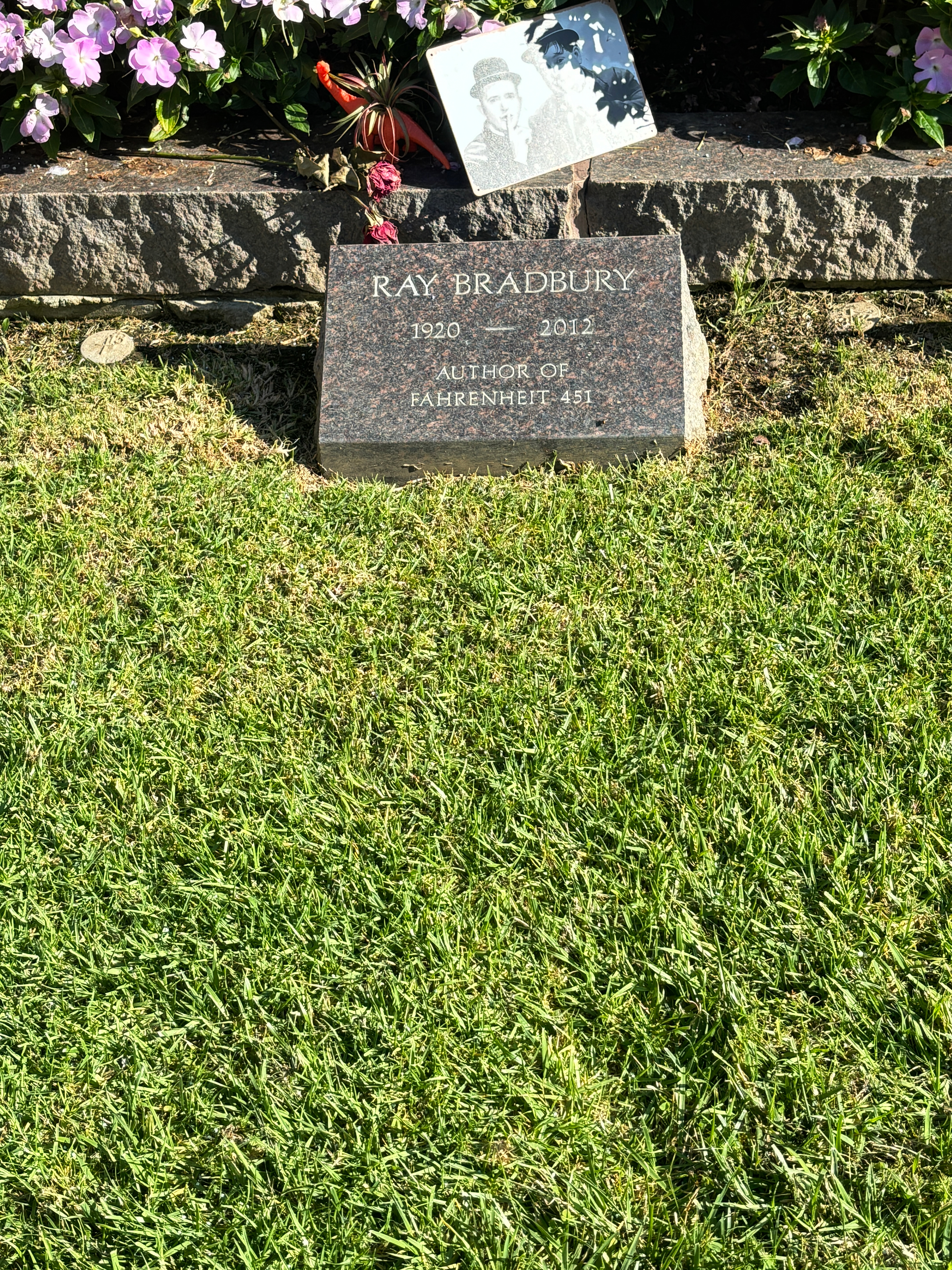
The headstone of Ray Bradbury

- Henny Backus (1911–2004), author, wife of Jim Backus
- Jim Backus (1913–1989), actor
- Richard Baer (1928–2008), screenwriter
- Dave Barbour (1912–1965), musician
- Edgar Barrier (1907–1964), actor
- Patricia Barry (1921–2016), actor
- Eileen Barton (1924–2006), singer
- Richard Basehart (1914–1984), actor
- Greg Bautzer (1911–1987), attorney
- Lee Phillip Bell (1928–2020), television host, producer
- William J. Bell (1927–2005), producer
- Isabel Bigley (1926–2006), actress
- Whit Bissell (1909–1996), actor
- Hilary Blake (1950–2007), musician
- Billy Bletcher (1894–1979), actor, voice artist
- Robert Bloch (1917–1994), writer
- Lloyd Bochner (1924–2005), actor
- Peter Bogdanovich (1939–2022), director and screenwriter
- Benedict Bogeaus (1904–1968), producer
- John Boles (1895–1969), actor
- Dorris Bowdon (1914–2005), actress
- Ray Bradbury (1920–2012), author; buried with his wife Marguerite McClure Bradbury
- Fanny Brice (1891–1951), actress, comedian, singer (formerly buried in Home of Peace Cemetery)
- William Brice (1921–2008), artist, son of Fanny Brice
- Les Brown (1912–2001), musician
- Vanessa Brown (1928–1999), actress
- Clarence Bull (1896–1979), photographer
- Anne Buydens (1919–2021), philanthropist, film producer, wife of Kirk Douglas

=== C ===
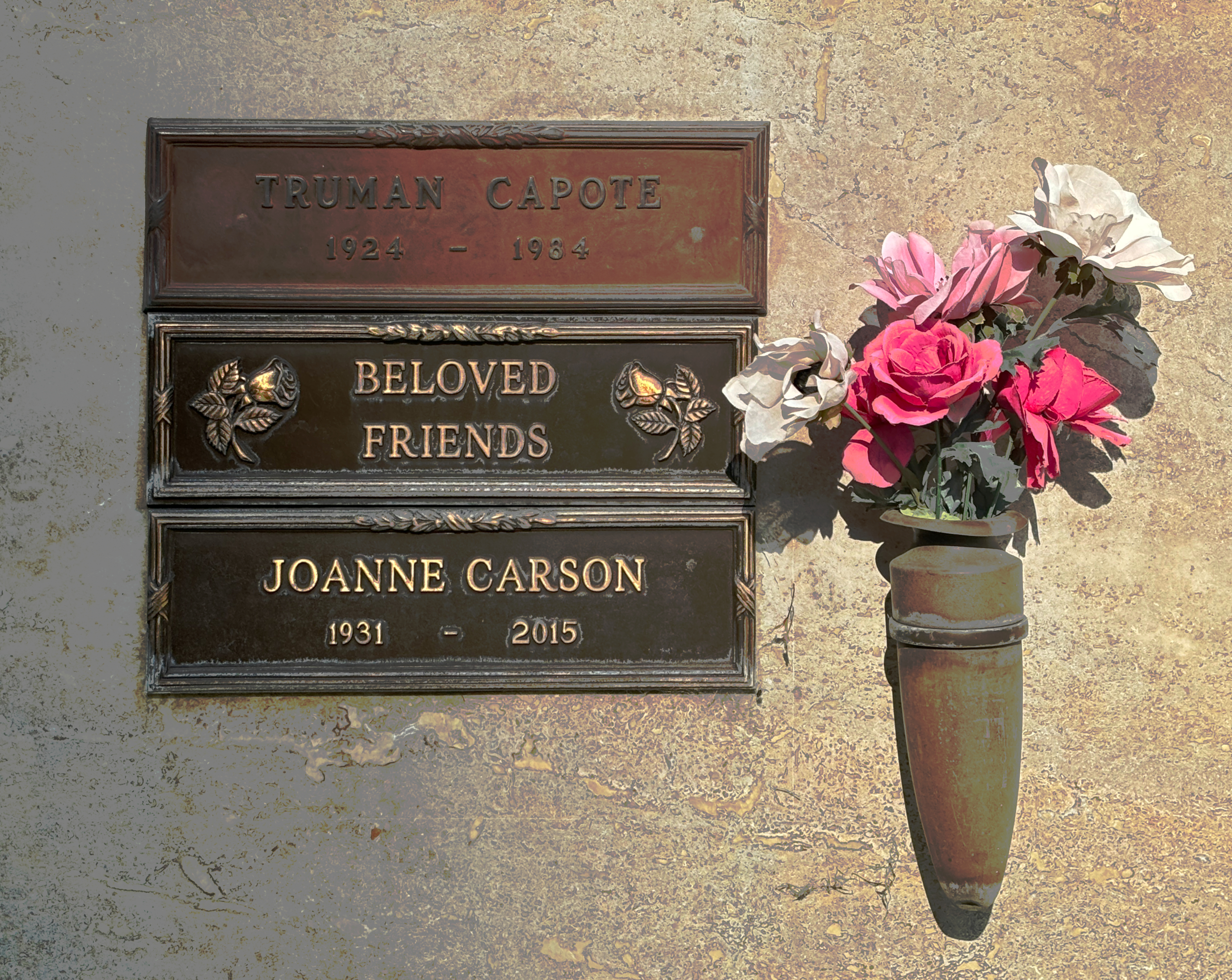
Crypt of Truman Capote and Joanne Carson

- Sebastian Cabot (1918–1977), actor
- Sammy Cahn (1913–1993), songwriter
- Truman Capote (1924–1984), author
- Edward Carrere (1906–1984), director
- Harry Carey, Jr. (1921–2012), actor
- Mary Carlisle (1914–2018), actress
- John Cassavetes (1929–1989), actor, screenwriter, director, producer
- Mario Castelnuovo-Tedesco (1895–1968), composer
- James Coburn (1928–2002), actor
- Jackie Collins (1937–2015), novelist, screenwriter, producer
- Michel Colombier (1939–2004), musician, composer
- Ray Conniff (1916–2002), musician
- Richard Conte (1910–1975), actor
- Tim Conway (1933–2019), actor, comedian
- Lawrence Cook (1930–2003), actor
- Ian Copeland (1949–2006), music promoter
- Alexander Courage (1919–2008), composer
- Bob Crane (1928–1978), actor
- Norma Crane (1928–1973), actress

=== D ===
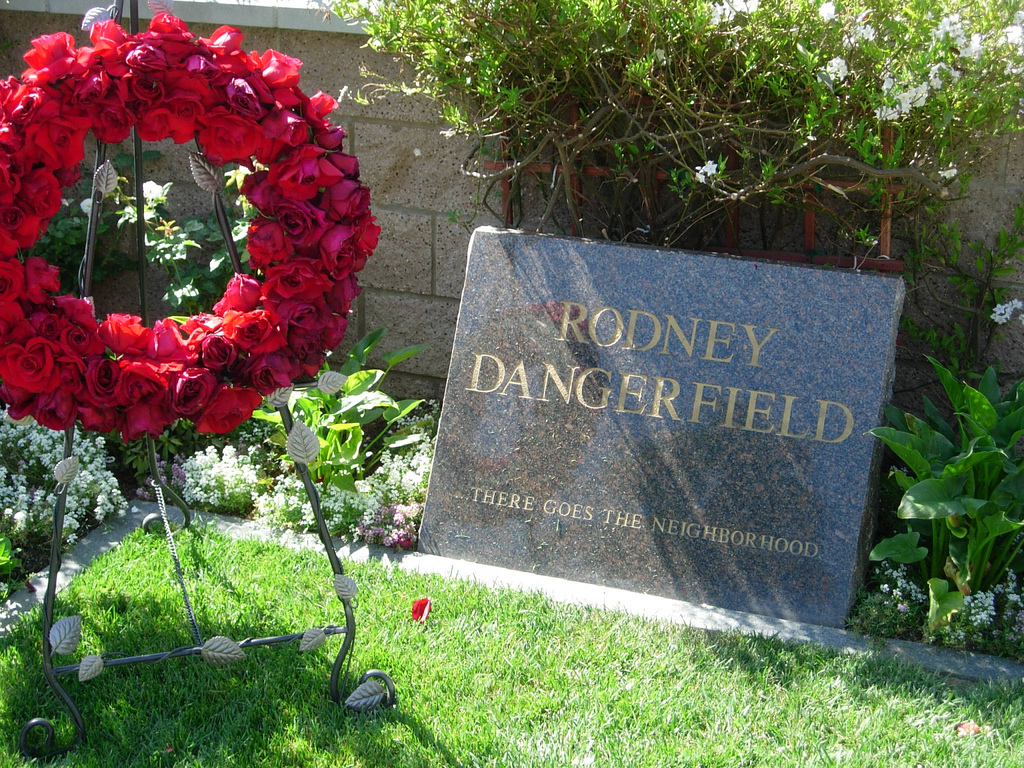
Rodney Dangerfield's humorous tombstone at Pierce Brothers Westwood Memorial Park Cemetery.

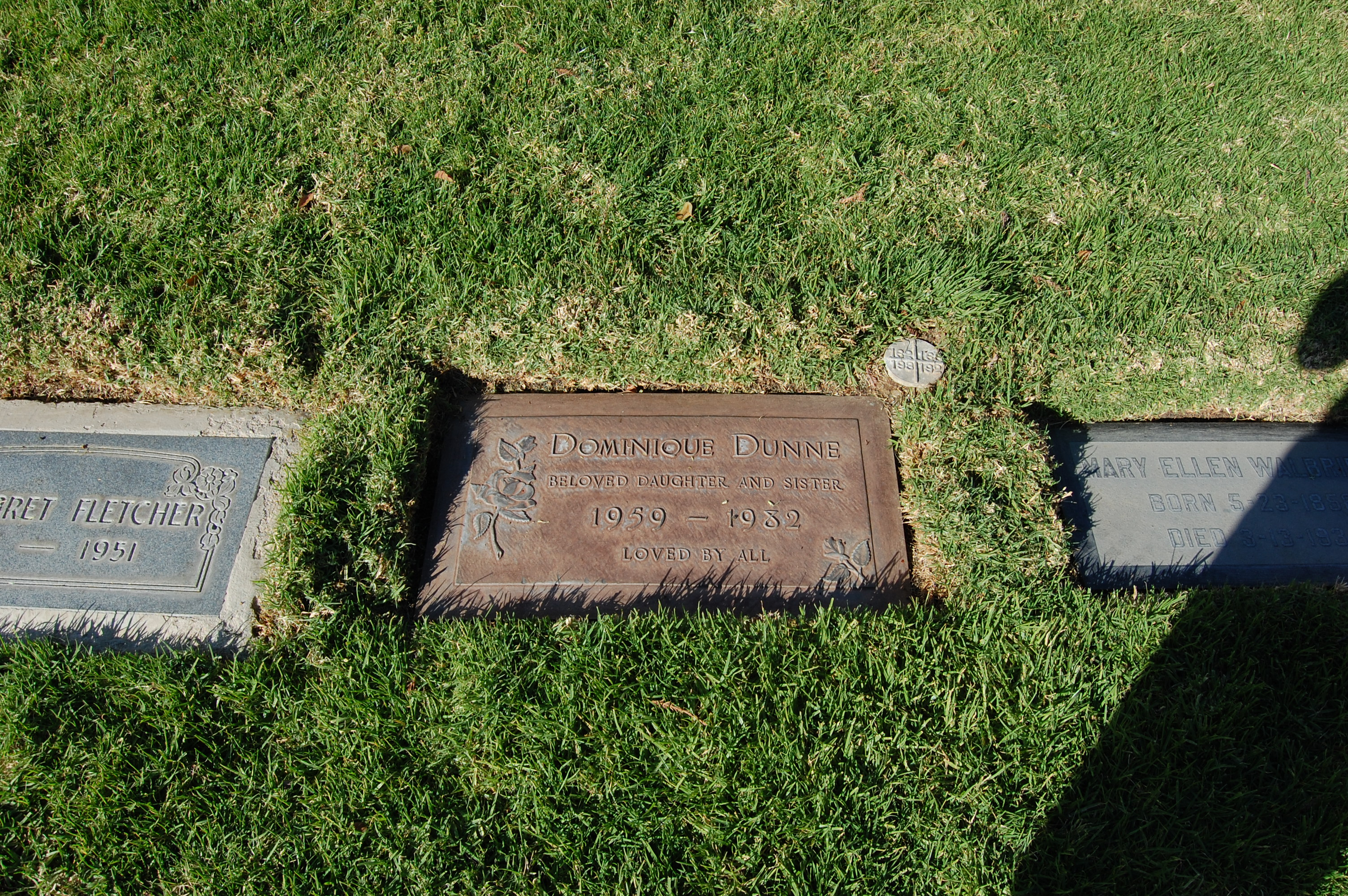
Grave of Dominique Dunne

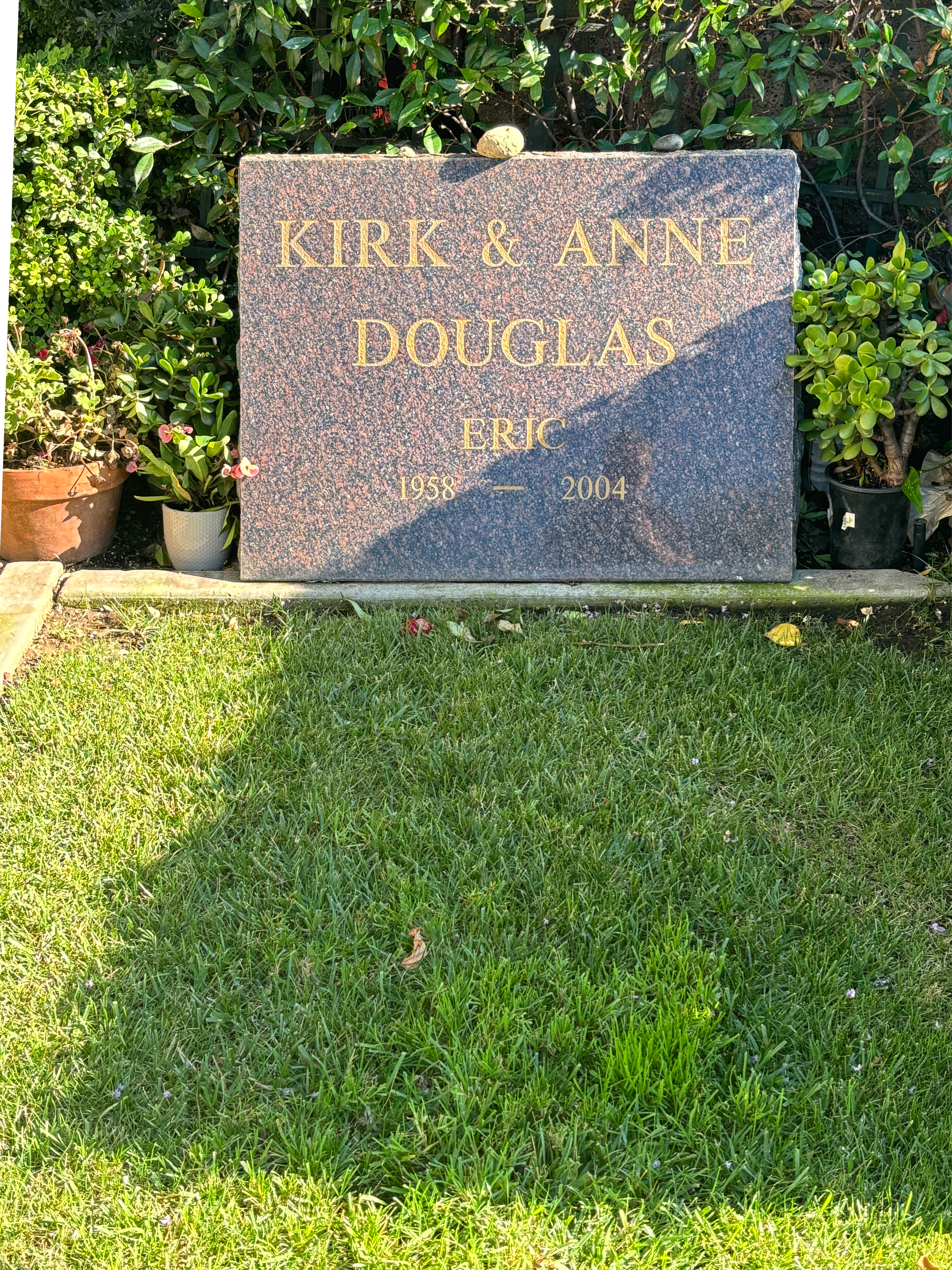
Grave of Kirk, Anne and Eric Douglas.

- Rodney Dangerfield (1921–2004), comedian, actor
- Helmut Dantine (1917–1982), actor
- Danny Dark (1938–2004), announcer
- Steve Darrell (1904–1970), actor
- Marvin Davis (1925–2004), oil tycoon, businessman
- Jason Davis (1984–2020), actor
- Richard Dawson (1932–2012), actor, television host
- Don DeFore (1913–1993), actor
- Laura Devon (1931–2007), actress
- Richard Dimitri (1942-2025), actor
- Philip Dorn (1901–1975), actor
- Eric Douglas (1958–2004), actor
- Kirk Douglas (1916–2020), actor
- Dominique Dunne (1959–1982) murder victim, Poltergeist actress, daughter of writer Dominick Dunne, sister of actor-director Griffin Dunne
- Ariel Durant (1898–1981), historian, Pulitzer Prize in literature, co-wrote The Story of Civilization, wife of Will Durant
- Will Durant (1885–1981), historian, Pulitzer Prize in literature, co-wrote The Story of Civilization, husband of Ariel Durant

=== E ===
- Nora Eddington (1924–2001), actress, 2nd wife of Errol Flynn, 3rd wife of Dick Haymes
- Roger Edens (1905–1970), vocal arranger, songwriter, producer
- Jack Elliott (1927–2001), songwriter
- Geoff Emerick (1945–2018), sound engineer
- Harry Essex (1910–1997), writer
- Dennis Etchison (1943–2019), writer
- Ray Evans (1915–2007), songwriter

=== F ===
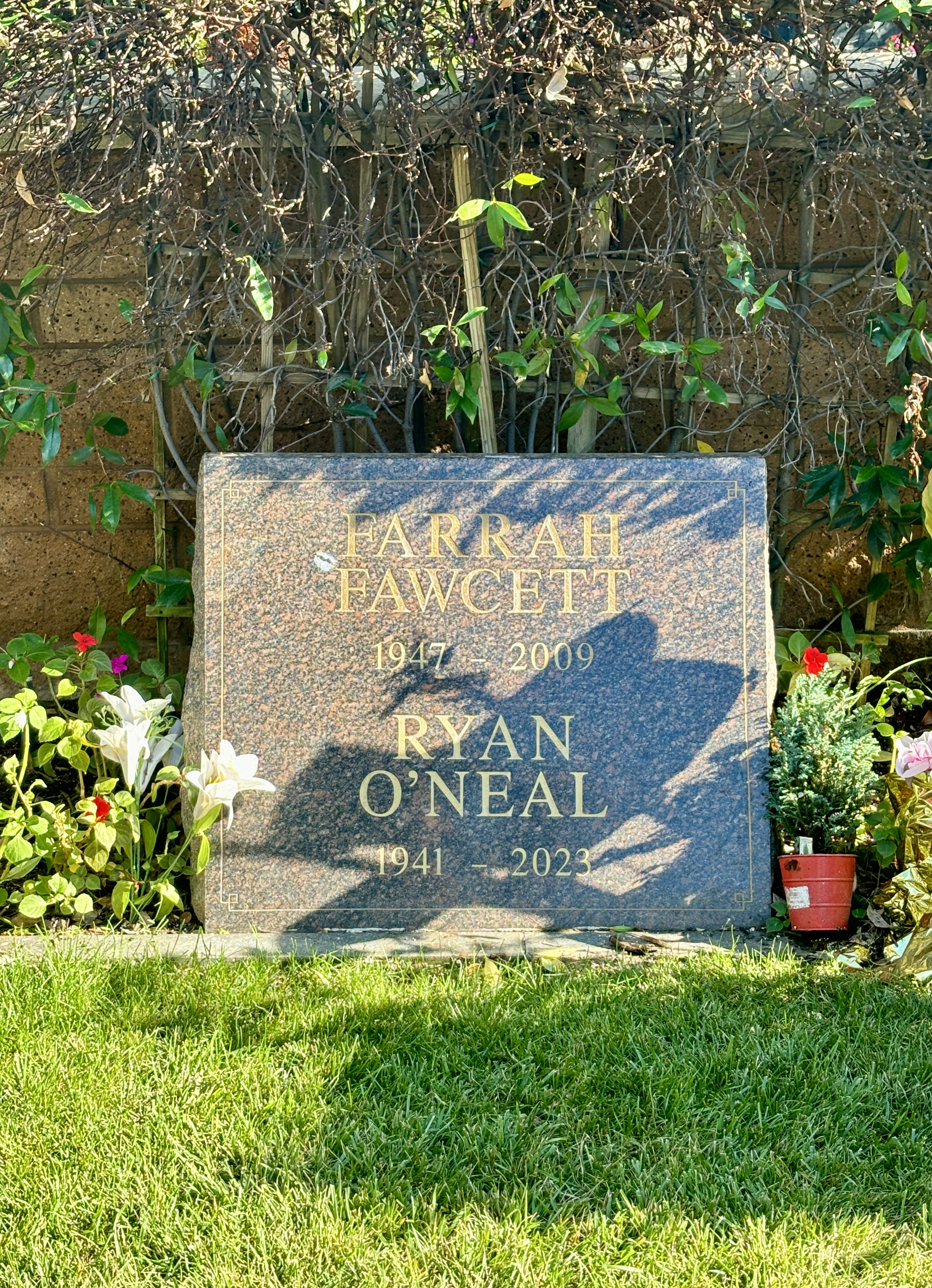
Grave of Farrah Fawcett and Ryan O'Neal

- Peter Falk (1927–2011), actor
- Farrah Fawcett (1947–2009), actress
- Bert Fields (1929–2022), entertainment attorney, writer, musician
- Freddie Fields (1923–2007), talent agent
- Jay C. Flippen (1899–1971), actor
- June Foray (1917–2017), voice actress
- Michael Fox (1921–1996), actor
- Coleman Francis (1919–1973), film director
- Leslie Frankenheimer (1948–2013), set decorator
- Stan Freberg (1926–2015), voice actor
- Georgia Frontiere (1927–2008), football owner
- Faiza Rauf (1923–1994), Egyptian princess

=== G ===
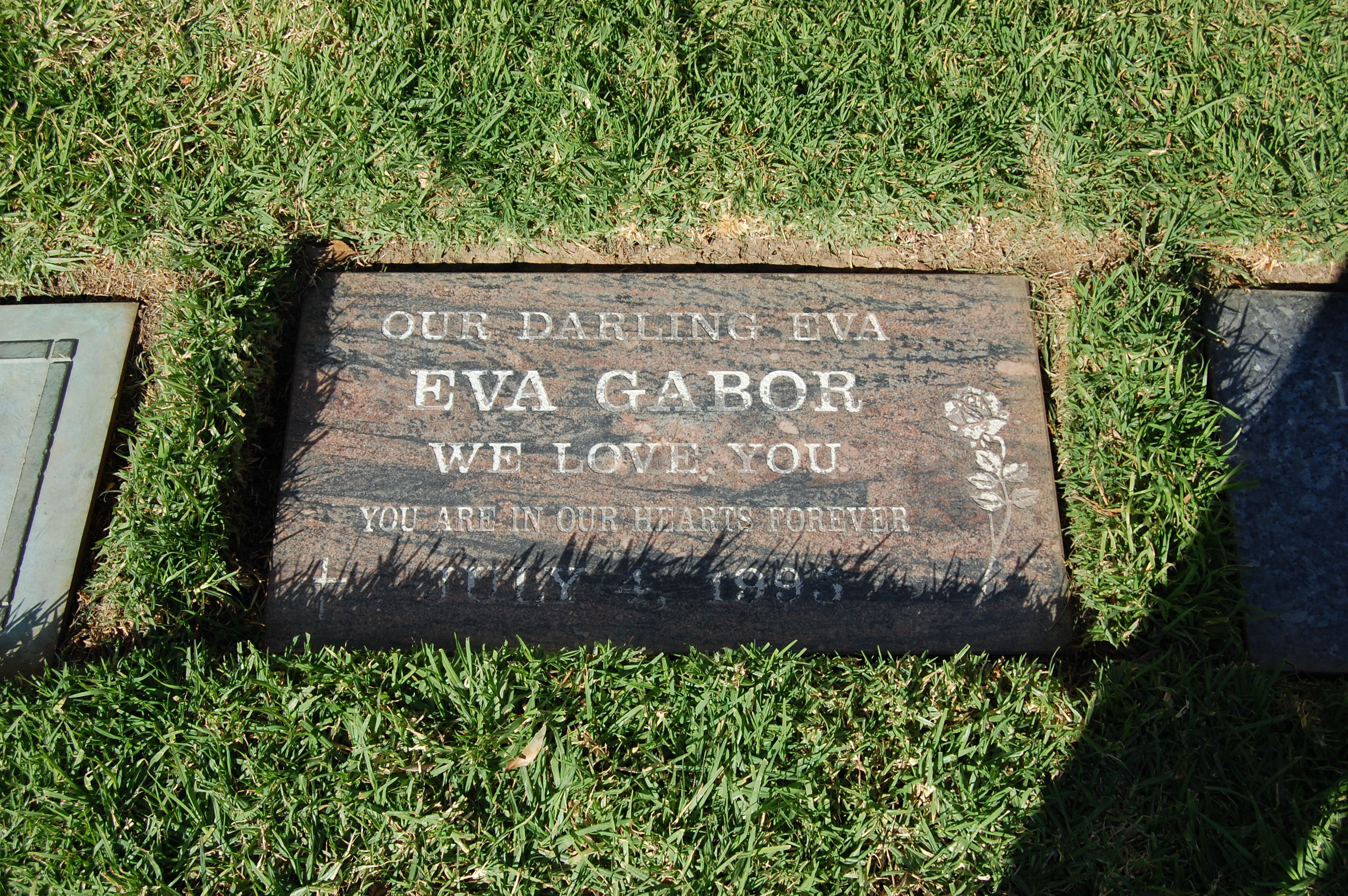
Grave of Eva Gabor

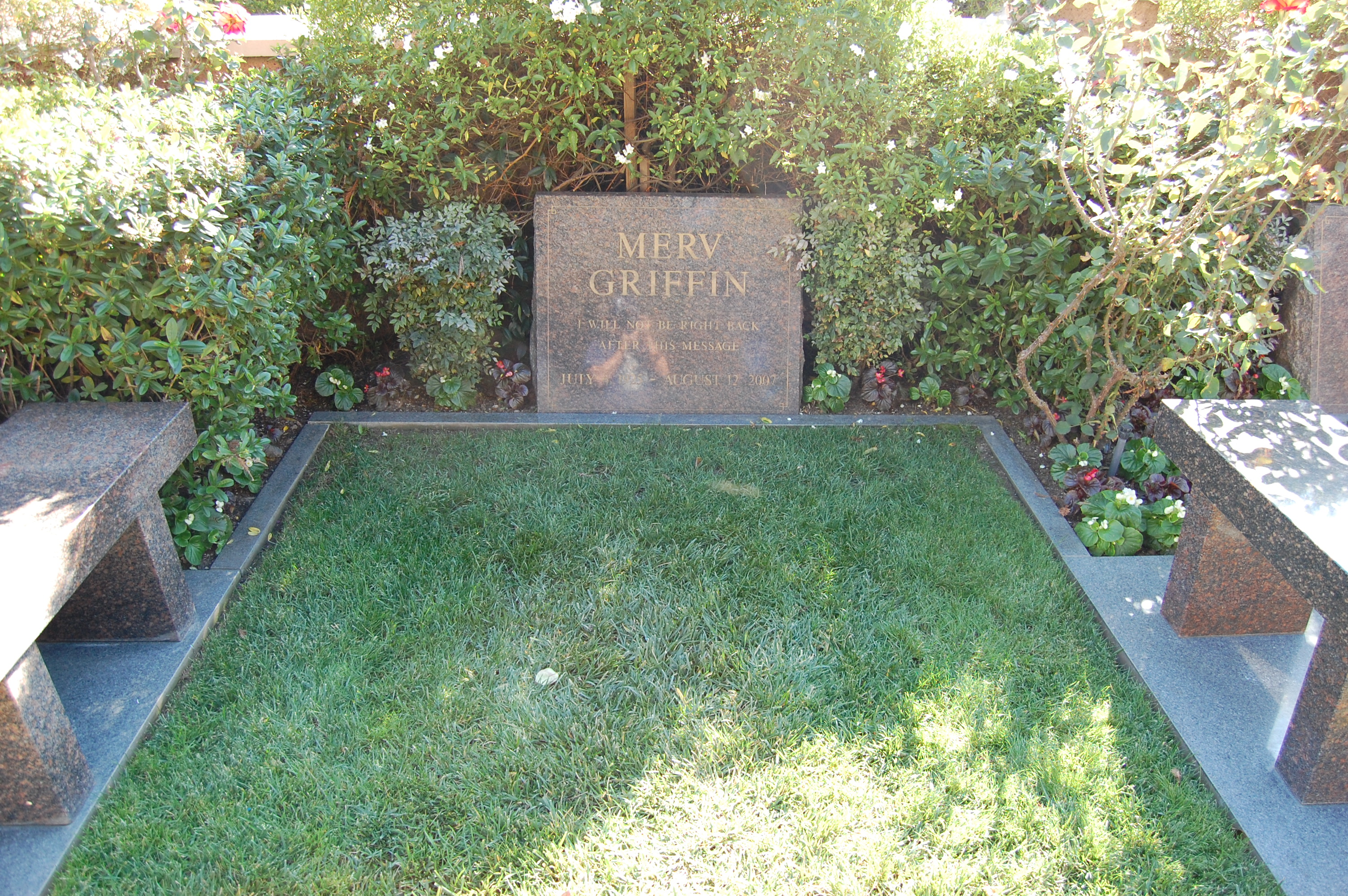
Grave of Merv Griffin

- Eva Gabor (1919–1995), actress
- June Gale (1911–1996), actress, wife of Oscar Levant
- Michael V. Gazzo (1923–1995), actor
- Christopher George (1931–1983), actor
- Leonard Gershe (1922–2002), composer
- Master Henry Gibson (1942–2002), musician
- Gary Glasberg (1966-2016), writer and producer
- Paul Gleason (1939–2006), character actor
- Thomas Gomez (1905–1971), actor
- Don Gordon (1926–2017), actor
- Robert Gottschalk (1918–1982), camera technician, co-founder of Panavision
- Walter Grauman (1922–2015), director
- Howard Greer (1896–1974), costume and fashion designer
- Jane Greer (1924–2001), actress
- Merv Griffin (1925–2007), producer, television host, singer

=== H ===
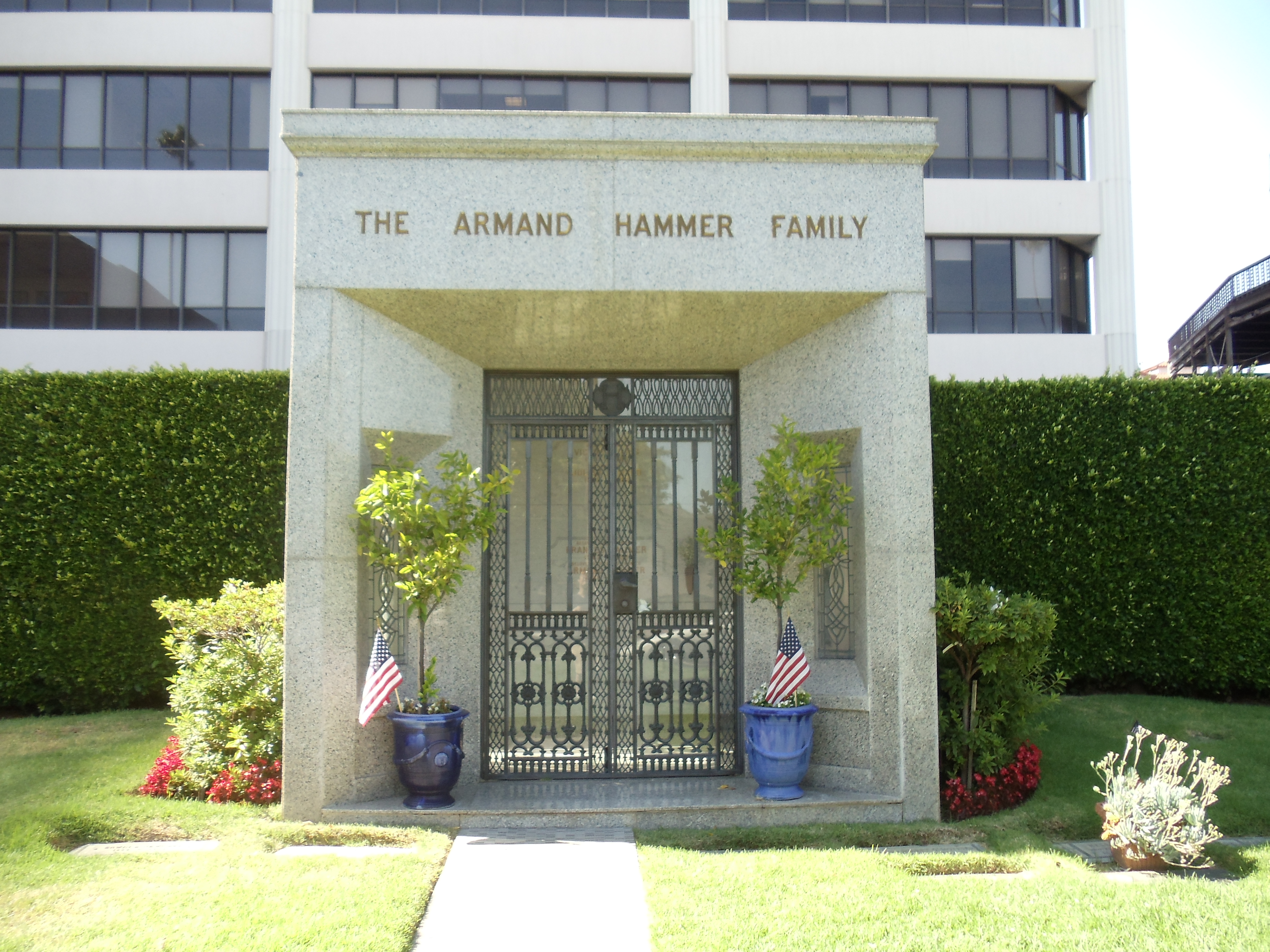
The Armand Hammer Family Tomb in Westwood Memorial Park

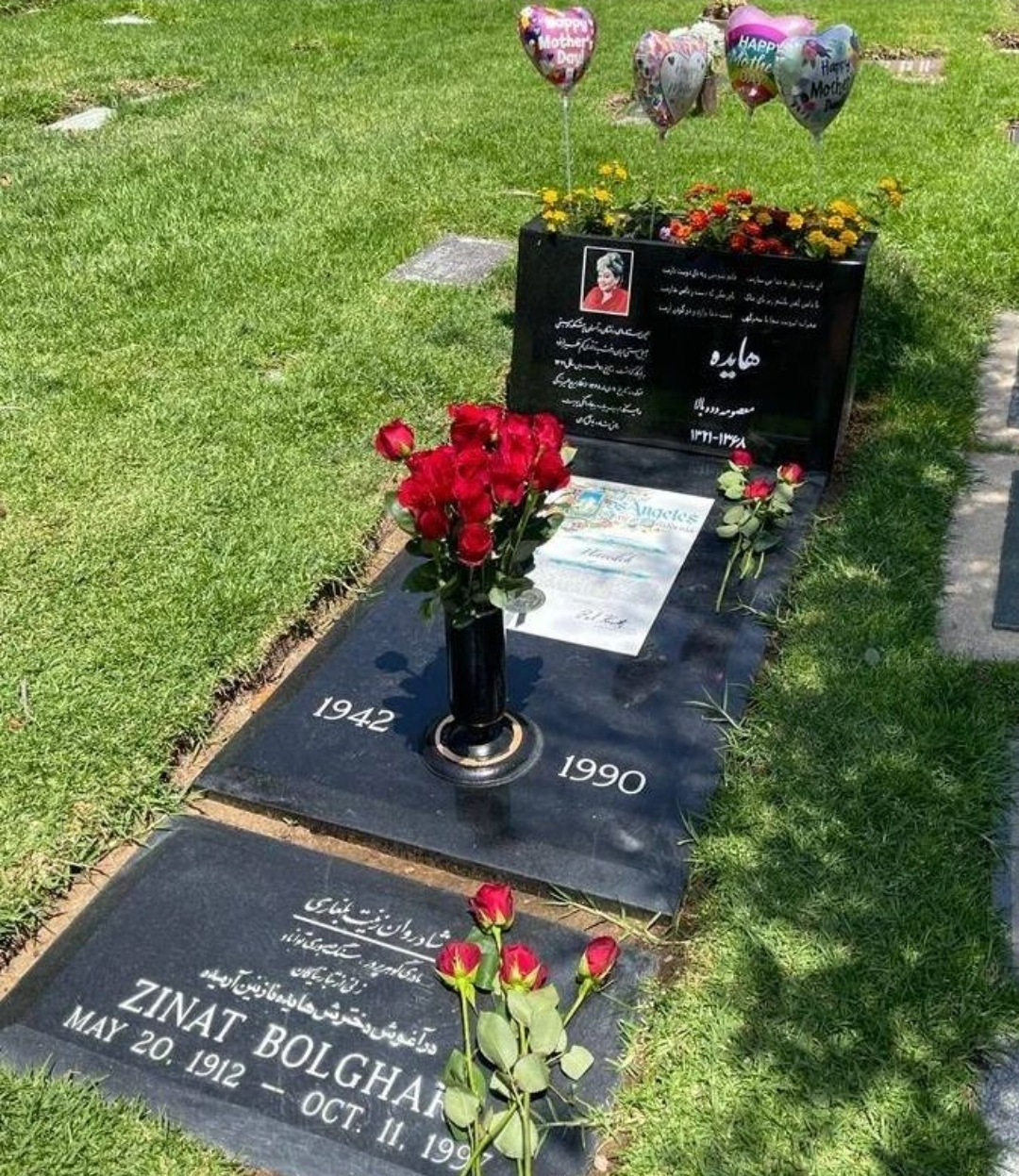
Hayedeh's grave

- Loretta King Hadler (1917–2007), actress
- Hayedeh (1942–1990), Iranian singer and media personality
- Carrie Hamilton (1963–2002), actress, singer, daughter of Carol Burnett
- Armand Hammer (1898–1990), oil tycoon, art collector, former president of Occidental Petroleum
- Bong Soo Han (1933–2007), martial artist
- Jonathan Harris (1914–2002), actor
- Harold Hecht (1907–1985), film producer
- Hugh Hefner (1926–2017), Playboy magazine founder and publisher, businessman
- Percy Helton (1894–1971), actor
- Florence Henderson (1934–2016), actress, singer, television host
- Francesca Hilton (1947–2015), actress, daughter of Zsa Zsa Gabor
- Connie Hines (1931–2009), actress
- Jonathan Hole (1904–1998), actor, buried with his wife Betty Hanna, and son David Jon Hole
- Ben Howard (1904–1970), aircraft designer, race pilot
- James Wong Howe (1899–1976), cinematographer
- Rosanna Huffman (1938–2016), actress
- Mark R. Hughes (1956–2000), founder of Herbalife
- Ronald Hughes (1935–1970), lawyer
- Ross Hunter (1920–1996), producer, director, actor
- Jim Hutton (1934–1979), actor

=== I ===
- Steve Ihnat (1934–1972), actor
- Steve Inwood (1947-2025), actor
- Franklin D. Israel (1945-1996), Architect; 1975 Rome Prize for architecture

=== J ===
- Donald G. Jackson (1943–2003), filmmaker
- Kevin Jarre (1954–2011), screenwriter
- Nunnally Johnson (1897–1977), screenwriter, director
- Louis Jourdan (1921–2015), actor
- Brenda Joyce (1917–2009), actress

=== K ===
- Phil Karlson (1908–1985), director
- Louis Kaufman (1905–1994), violinist
- Beatrice Kay (1907–1986), actress, singer
- Nora Kaye (1920–1987), ballerina
- Brian Keith (1921–1997), actor
- Cecil Kellaway (1893–1973), actor
- Nancy Kelly (1921–1995), actress
- Stan Kenton (1911–1979), musician
- Victor Kilian (1891–1979), actor, murdered
- James Howard "Dutch" Kindelberger (1895–1962), aviation executive
- Louis King (1898–1962), director
- Jack Klugman (1922–2012), actor, comedian, director, screenwriter
- Don Knotts (1924–2006), actor, comedian
- Miliza Korjus (1909–1980), opera singer
- Phyllis Kennedy (1914–1998), actress

=== L ===
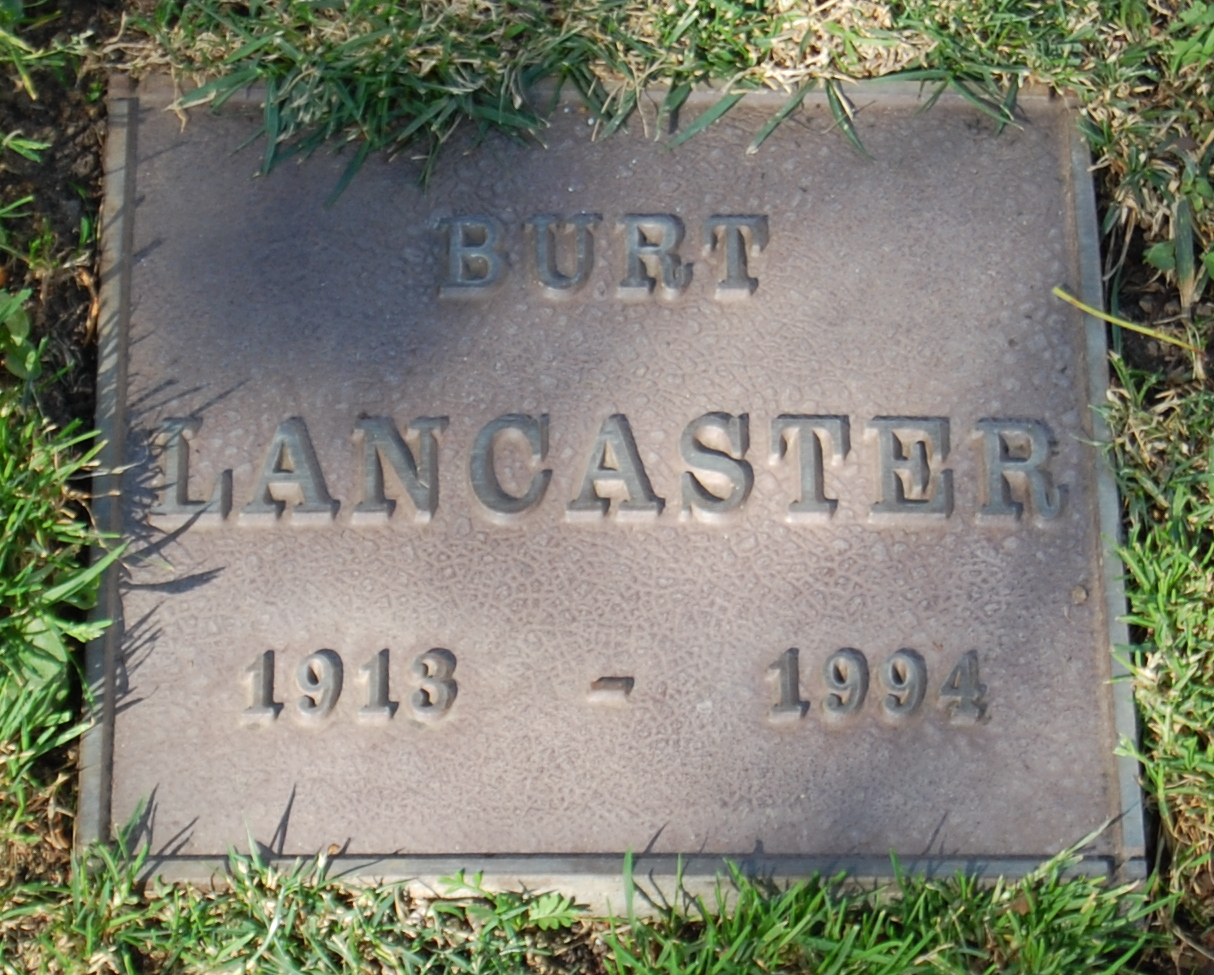
Grave of Burt Lancaster

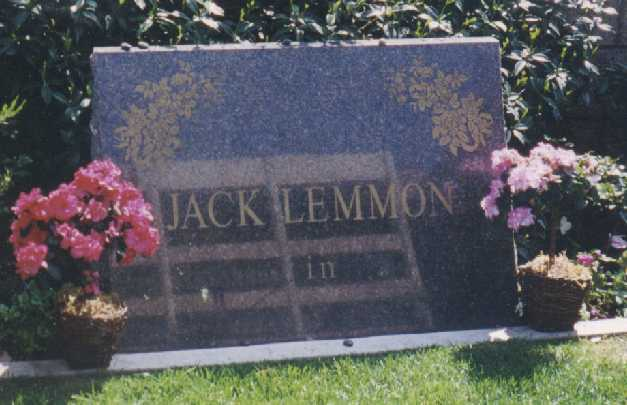
Jack Lemmon's headstone

- Perry Lafferty (1917–2005), director
- Bill Lancaster (1947–1997), actor, screenwriter
- Burt Lancaster (1913–1994), actor
- Sidney Lanfield (1898–1972), director
- Paul Laszlo (1900–1993), architect, furniture designer
- Ed Lauter (1938–2013), actor
- Marc Lawrence (1910–2005), actor
- Irving Paul Lazar (1907–1993), agent
- Joanna Lee (1931–2003), actress
- Peggy Lee (1920–2002), singer, songwriter, actress
- Ernest Lehman (1915–2005), screenwriter
- Janet Leigh (1927–2004), actress
- Jack Lemmon (1925–2001), actor
- Queenie Leonard (1905–2002), actress
- Bruce Lester (1912–2008), actor
- Oscar Levant (1906–1972), actor, pianist
- Richard Levinson (1934–1987), writer
- Harry Lewis (1920–2013), actor, restaurateur
- Marilyn Lewis (1929–2017), fashion designer, producer
- Alan W. Livingston (1917–2009), writer, producer
- Jay Livingston (1915–2001), songwriter
- Sondra Locke (1944–2018), actress
- Louis Loeffler (1897–1972), editor
- Robert Loggia (1930–2015), actor, director

=== M ===
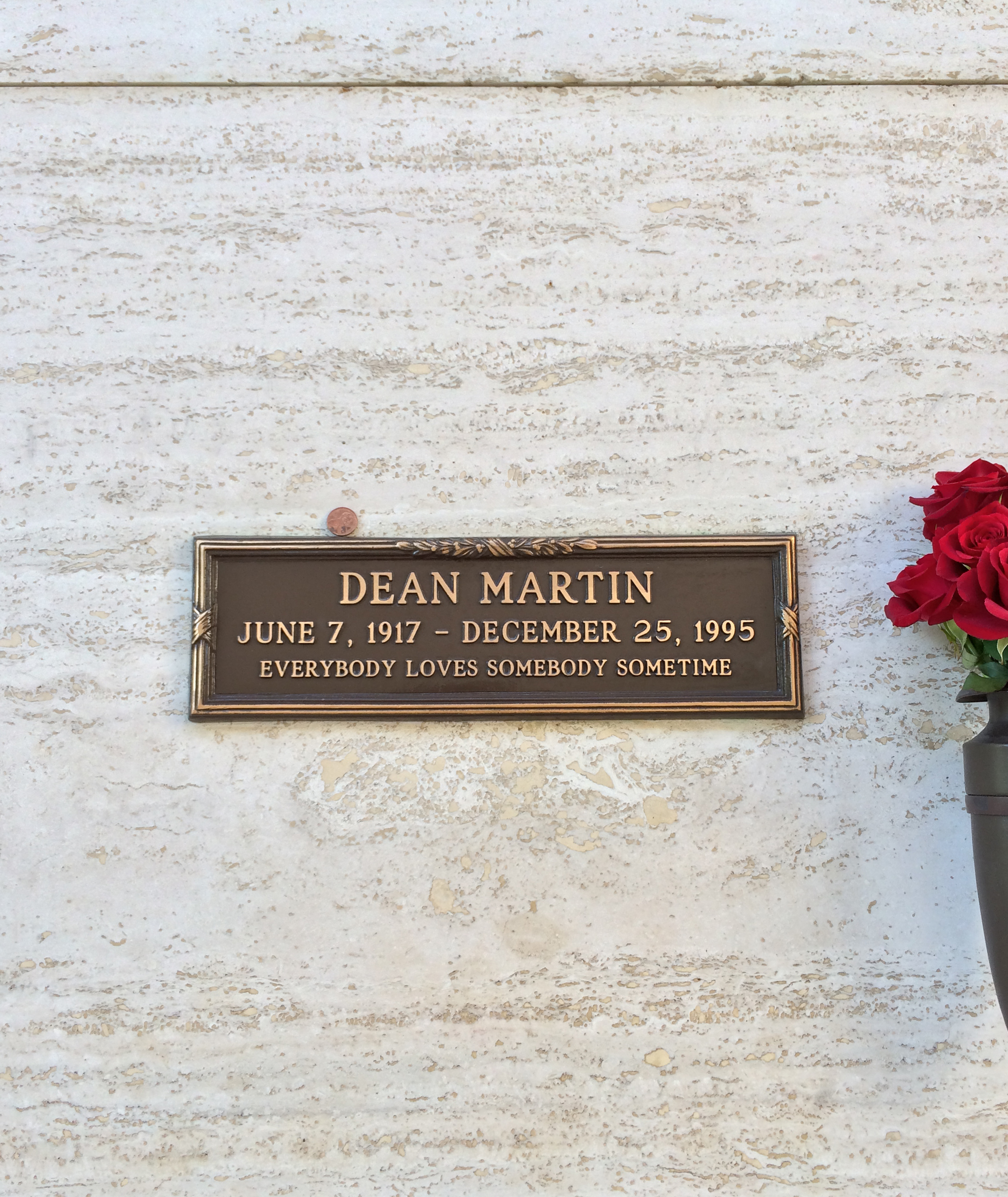
Dean Martin's crypt.

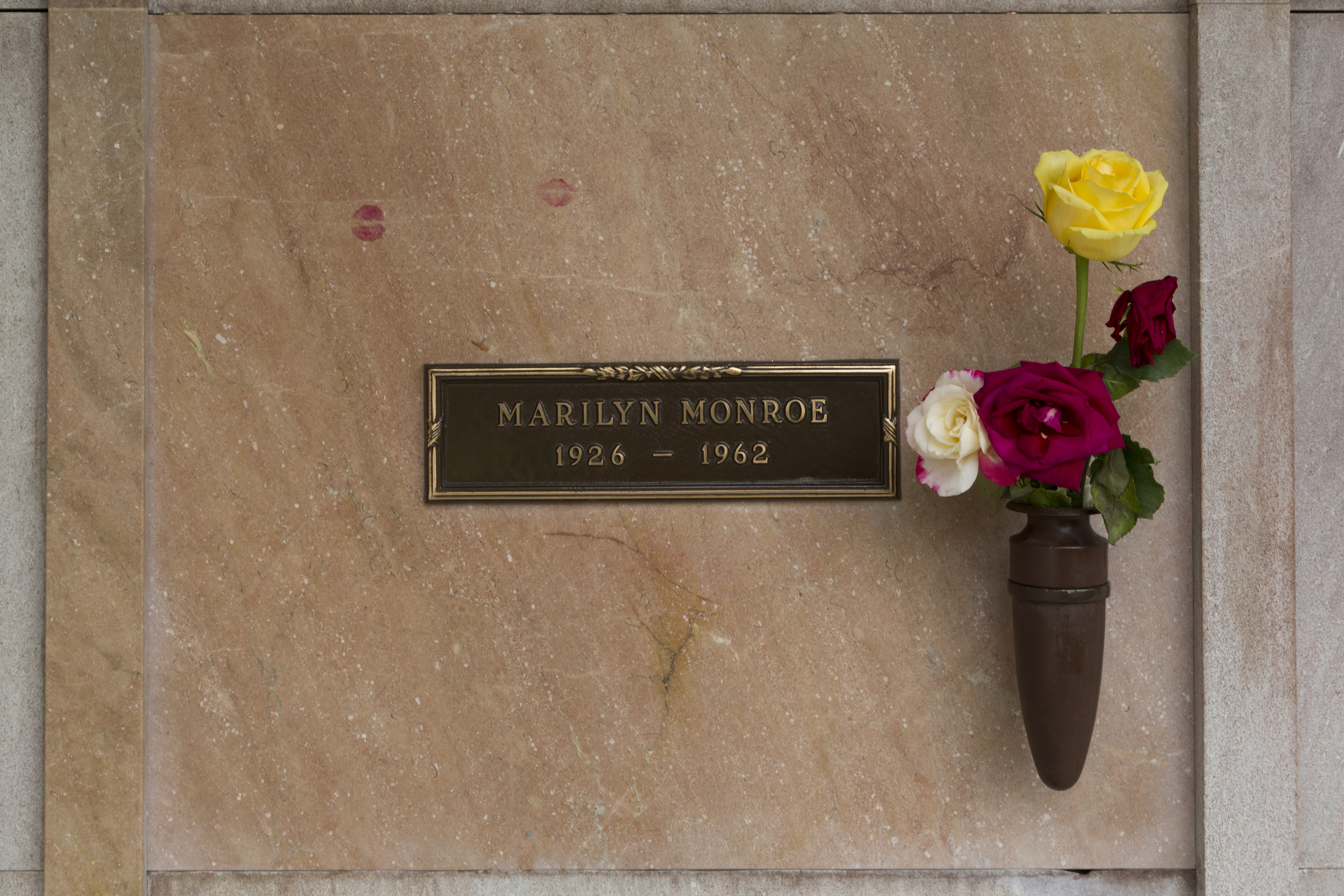
Marilyn Monroe's crypt.

- Helen Mack (1913-1986), actress, real name Helen McDougall McAvity
- Alexander Mackendrick (1912–1993), director
- Mahasti (1946–2007), Persian language pop singer from Tehran, younger sister of Hayedeh
- Karl Malden (1912–2009), actor
- Janet Margolin (1943–1993), actress, married to Ted Wass
- Dean Martin (1917–1995), actor, singer
- Andrew Marton (1904–1992), actor
- Samuel Marx (1902–1992), producer
- Pamela Mason (1916–1996), actress, wife of James Mason and Roy Kellino
- Portland Mason (1948–2004), actress, daughter of James Mason and Pamela Mason
- Shirley Mason (1900–1979), actress
- Osa Massen (1914–2006), actress
- Edith Massey (1918–1984), actress
- Carol Matthau (1925–2003), actress, wife of Walter Matthau and William Saroyan
- Walter Matthau (1920–2000), actor
- Ruth McDevitt (1895–1976), actress
- Rod McKuen (1933–2015), poet, composer
- Peter McWilliams (1949–2000), author
- Allan Melvin (1923–2008), actor, voice actor
- Lewis Milestone (1895–1980), director
- Marvin E. Miller (1913–1985), actor
- Shirley Mitchell (1919–2013), actress, wife of Jay Livingston
- Marilyn Monroe (1926–1962), actress
- Constance Moore (1920–2005), singer, actress
- Dolores Moran (1924–1982), actress
- Jeff Morris (1934–2004), actor
- Lloyd Morrisett (1929–2023), psychologist, co-founder of Sesame Workshop, co-creator of Sesame Street
- Grete Mosheim (1905–1986), actress

=== N ===
- Nader Naderpour (1929–2000), Iranian poet
- David Nelson (1936–2011), actor, son of Ozzie and Harriet Nelson, older brother of Ricky Nelson
- William Newell (1894–1967), actor
- Lloyd Nolan (1902–1985), actor

=== O ===
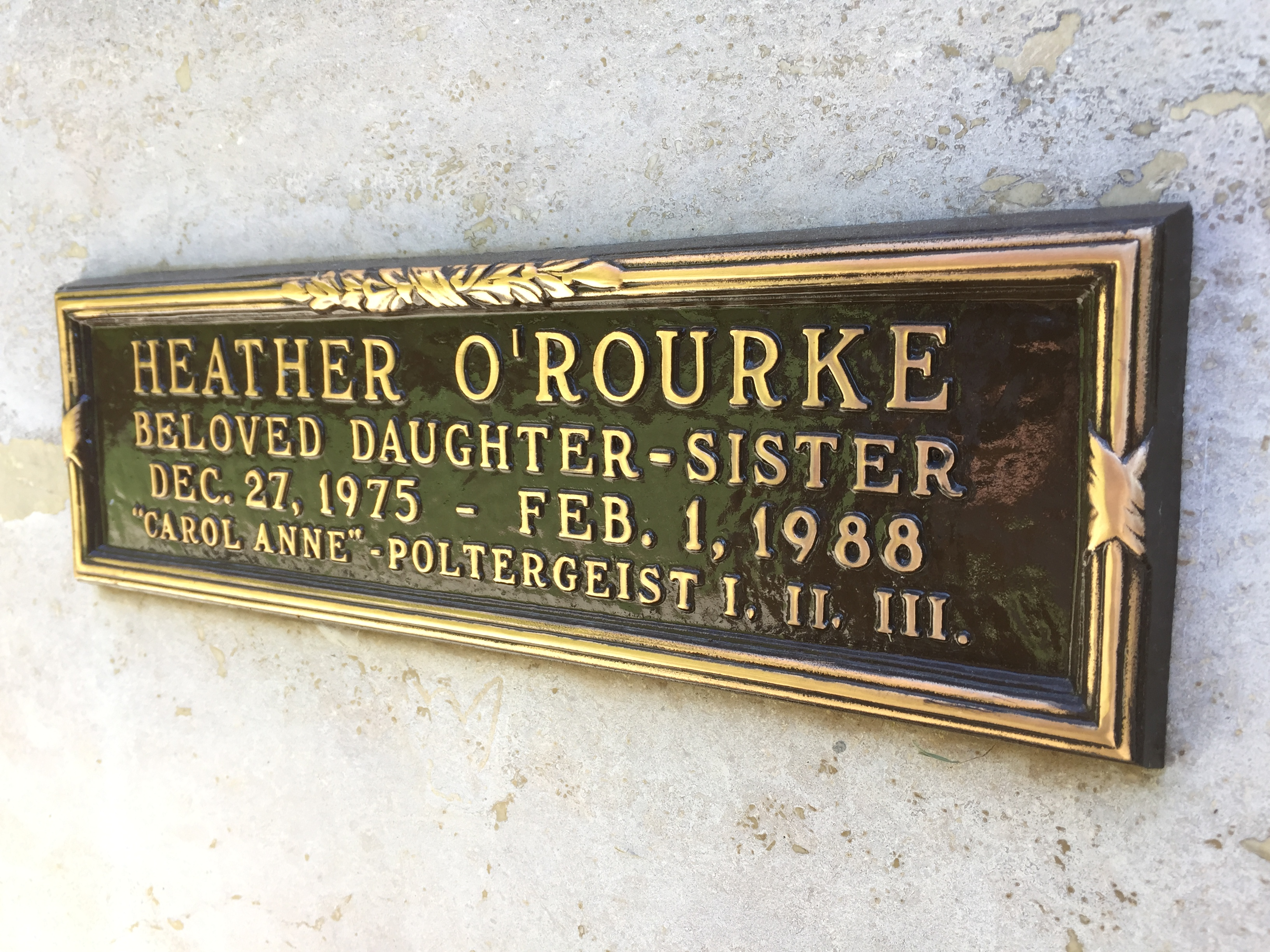
Inscription at Heather O'Rourke's crypt.

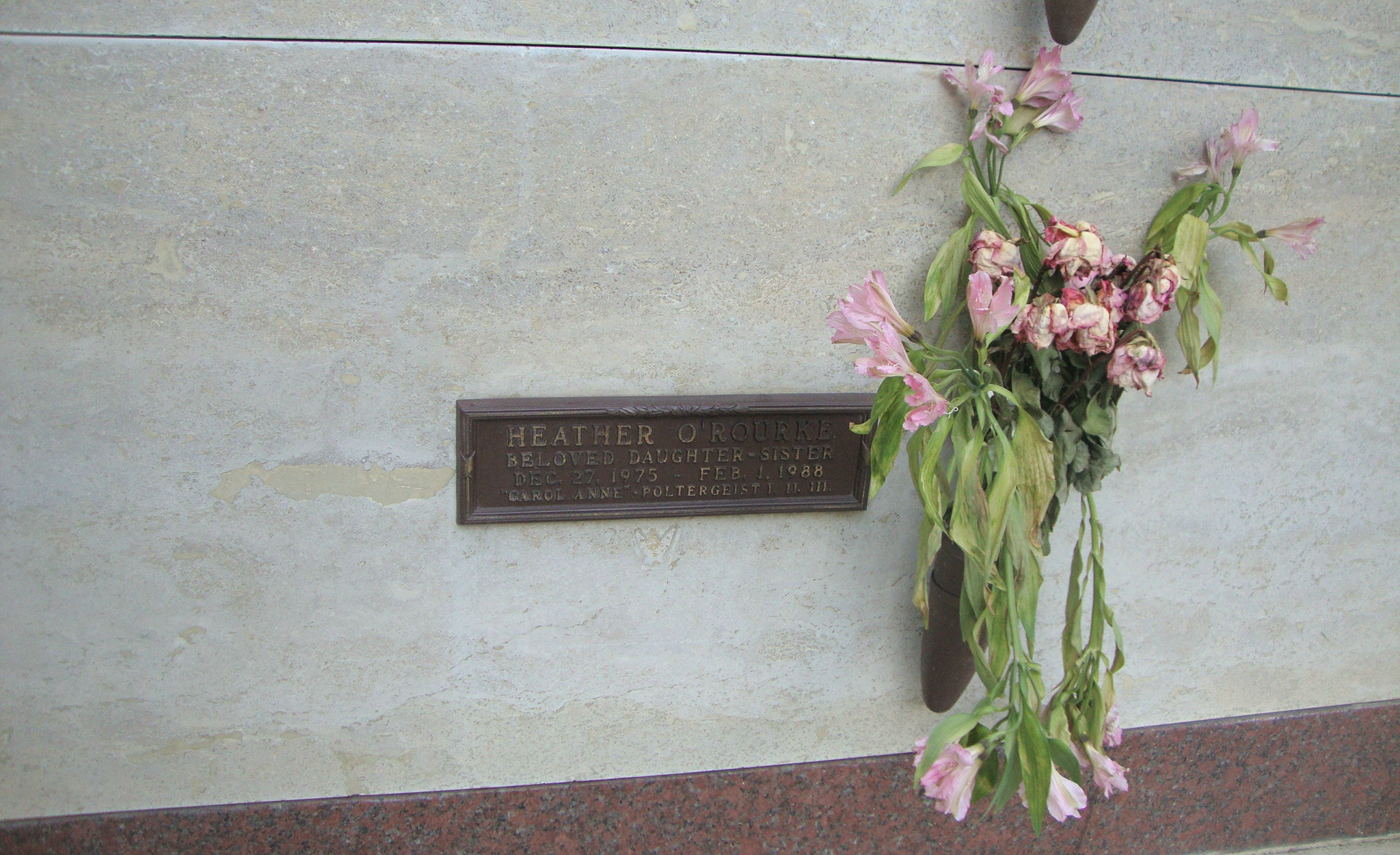
Heather O'Rourke's crypt

- Carroll O'Connor (1924–2001), actor
- Ryan O'Neal (1941–2023), actor
- Heather O'Rourke (1975–1988), actress
- Barbara Orbison (1950–2011), wife of Roy Orbison
- Roy Orbison (1936–1988), singer; grave unmarked

=== P ===
- Bettie Page (1923–2008), model
- Dorothy Patrick (1921–1987), actress
- Wolfgang Petersen (1941–2022), director
- Frank Pierson (1925–2012), screenwriter, director
- Waite Phillips (1883–1964), oil tycoon, philanthropist
- Gregor Piatigorsky (1903–1976), cellist
- Jacqueline Piatigorsky (1911–2012), chess player
- James Prideaux (1927–2015), playwright

=== R ===
- Ford Rainey (1908–2005), actor
- Donna Reed (1921–1986), actress
- Jimmie Reese (1901–1994), baseball player and coach
- Renie Riano (1899–1971), actress
- Buddy Rich (1917–1987), drummer, bandleader
- Minnie Riperton (1947–1979), singer
- Ben Roberts (1916–1984), screenwriter; co-creator of Charlie's Angels
- Doris Roberts (1925–2016), actress, philanthropist, author
- Wayne Rogers (1933–2015), actor
- Hillevi Rombin (1933–1996), Miss Universe 1955
- Ruth Rose (1896–1978), screenwriter
- Herbert Ross (1927–2001), film director
- Gena Rowlands (1930–2024), actress

=== S ===
- Jay Sandrich (1932–2021), television director
- Franklin Schaffner (1920–1989), film director
- G. David Schine (1927–1996), film producer
- Ernest B. Schoedsack (1893–1979), film director
- George C. Scott (1927–1999), actor; grave unmarked
- Vivienne Segal (1897–1992), singer, actress
- Anne Seymour (1909–1988), actress
- Sidney Sheldon (1917–2007), author
- Dorothy Shay (1921–1978), actress, singer
- Jeremy Silman (1954-2023), chess player
- Sam Simon (1955–2015), writer, producer, director
- Richard Simmons (1948–2024), fitness instructor, television personality
- Lu Ann Simms (1932–2003), singer
- Sara Sothern (1895–1994), mother of Elizabeth Taylor
- Robert Stack (1919–2003), actor
- Sage Stallone (1976–2012), actor, son of Sylvester Stallone
- Ray Stark (1915–2004), film producer
- Josef von Sternberg (1894–1969), film director
- Donald E. Stewart (1930–1999), screenwriter
- Dorothy Stratten (1960–1980), actress, Playboy Playmate
- Danny Sugerman (1954–2005), writer, rock band manager
- Jennifer Syme (1972–2001), actress

=== T ===
- Don Taylor (1920–1998), actor, director
- Francis Lenn Taylor (1897–1968), art dealer, father of Elizabeth Taylor
- Kent Taylor (1907–1987), actor
- Irene Tedrow (1907–1995), actress
- William C. Thomas (1903–1984), film producer
- Marshall Thompson (1925–1992), actor
- Johnny Tillotson (1938-2025) recording artist, songwriter, entertainer
- Dan Tobin (1910–1982), actor
- Ernst Toch (1887–1964), composer
- Alvin Toffler (1928–2016), author
- Mel Tormé (1925–1999), singer, actor
- Helen Traubel (1899–1972), opera soprano
- Les Tremayne (1913–2003), actor
- Michael Trikilis (1940-2019), TV/film producer
- Frank Tuttle (1892–1963), screenwriter, producer
- Toofan (1946-2012) singer

=== V ===
- Sigrid Valdis (1935–2007), actress, widow of Bob Crane
- Clyde Van Dusen (1886–1951), horse trainer, won 1929 Kentucky Derby
- John Vivyan (1915–1983), actor

=== W ===
- June Walker (1900–1966), actress
- Pat Walshe (1900–1991), actor
- Larry Ward (1925–1985), actor, screenwriter
- Harry Warren (1893–1981), songwriter
- Joe Weider (1919–2013), bodybuilder, author, magazine publisher
- Winifred Westover (1899–1978), actress
- Chrissie White (1895–1989), silent film actress
- Michael White (1936–2016), producer
- Sean Whitesell (1963–2015), actor
- Margaret Whiting (1924–2011), singer
- Herbert Wiere (1908–1999), performer
- Cornel Wilde (1915–1989), actor
- Billy Wilder (1906–2002), filmmaker
- Brian Wilson (1942–2025), musician, composer, producer, founding member of The Beach Boys
- Carl Wilson (1946–1998), musician, founding member of The Beach Boys
- Estelle Winwood (1883–1984), actress
- Albert Wohlstetter (1913–1997), nuclear strategist
- Roberta Wohlstetter (1912–2007), historian of military intelligence
- Natalie Wood (1938–1981), actress

=== Y ===
- Edward Yang (1947–2007), filmmaker

=== Z ===
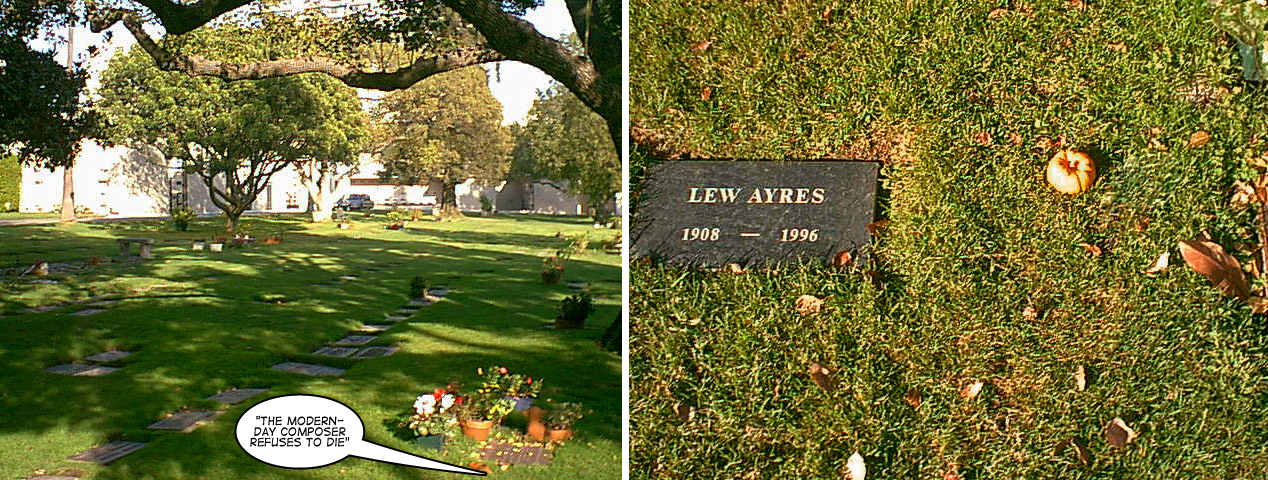
Unmarked grave of Frank Zappa, cemetery view looking southeast

- Darryl F. Zanuck (1902–1979), head of 20th Century Fox studios, father of Richard D. Zanuck
- Virginia Zanuck (1908–1982), actress, wife of Darryl F. Zanuck, mother of Richard D. Zanuck
- Frank Zappa (1940–1993), composer, musician, satirist, leader of The Mothers of Invention; grave unmarked
- Gail Zappa (1945–2015), widow of Frank Zappa and trustee of the Zappa Family Trust; buried next to her husband

== See also ==
- List of United States cemeteries
