= Ennio Bolognini =

Argentine musician (1893–1979)

Ennio Bolognini (November 7, 1893—July 31, 1979) was an Argentine-born American cellist, guitarist, composer, conductor, professional boxer, pilot, and flight instructor. Though seldom remembered today, his musical virtuosity was widely admired by his contemporaries during his lifetime. Pablo Casals praised him as "the greatest cello talent I ever heard in my life". Gregor Piatigorsky told Christine Walevska's father, "No, I am not the greatest cellist in the world; neither is Feuermann. The greatest is the Argentine Bolognini."

== Early life and musical training ==
Bolognini was born in Buenos Aires, Argentina on November 7, 1893. His mother was a prominent singer and opera coach at the Teatro Colón in Buenos Aires. His father, Egidio, a close friend of Arturo Toscanini (Ennio's godfather), was an Italian correspondent for the Paris-based newspaper Le Figaro and an amateur cellist. He taught his son the instrument with the help and encouragement of Toscanini (who began his career as a cellist). Ennio's exceptional talent led Toscanini to nickname his godson "Genio" ("Genius"). Ennio made his performance debut at the age of 12, and soon enrolled in the St. Cecilia Conservatory in Buenos Aires, where he studied with the Spanish cellist José García Jacot, Pablo Casals's teacher. At the age of 15 he won the Iberian-American international cello competition and was awarded as first prize a cello made by the Argentine violin and cello maker Luigi Rovatti. At age 17 he performed Le Cygne, accompanied by Saint-Saëns himself; and later the Richard Strauss cello sonata, also with its composer at the piano.

As he continued his musical education he also became a professional boxer and won the welterweight championship of South America. After his graduation he worked in Chile for two years as a cellist and conductor.

== Career ==
In 1923 Bolognini came to the United States to serve as a sparring partner for Luis Firpo in preparation for Firpo's legendary world heavyweight championship fight against Jack Dempsey. After the bout he remained in the US, settling in Philadelphia and joining the Philadelphia Orchestra. Four years later he moved to Chicago, where he became principal cellist of the Chicago Symphony Orchestra. A charismatic man with a fiery temper, Bolognini became known for such eccentricities as bringing his dog to all symphony rehearsals, and playing all the other instruments of the orchestra. He also played flamenco guitar, and reputedly amused his friends by playing flamenco music on his cello, as if it were a guitar.

He became an aviator in the early days of flight, and was one of the founders of the Civil Air Patrol. During World War II he trained cadets to fly B-29 bombers, and continued to fly airplanes into his eighties. He was also a notable marksman, swimmer, sketch artist, and gourmet cook. He spoke fluent Spanish, Italian, French, German, and English, and was conversant in Hebrew, Greek, Japanese, Hungarian, Russian, and 15 different Italian dialects.

After leaving the Chicago Symphony in 1930, Bolognini toured as a soloist and became a popular conductor of the Grant Park Symphony Orchestra, a summertime publicly sponsored orchestra in Chicago. He also became a prominent instructor; Christine Walevska was one of his proteges. Later, he specialized in founding, building, and conducting orchestras in cities, such as Waukegan, Illinois, that had never had such ensembles.

In 1951 he moved to Las Vegas, where he lived for the remainder of his life, and founded and conducted a symphony orchestra there (unrelated to the current Las Vegas Philharmonic). He disliked musical recordings, and refused to allow his performances of major cello works such as the Bach Suites to be recorded. The few professional recordings in existence are limited to musical vignettes and his own short compositions. One assemblage of amateur recordings, including most of the first Bach Suite, Kol Nidrei, and the Prize song from Die Meistersinger, taped surreptitiously by Bolognini's longtime accompanist Donald Kemp during concerts and rehearsals, was released as a CD in 1994.

Bolognini's brother Remo was a violinist with the Chicago Symphony and the New York Philharmonic, assistant concertmaster of the Baltimore Symphony, and concertmaster of the NBC Symphony under Toscanini. Another brother, Astorre, was a violist with the Houston Symphony.

Bolognini died in his sleep at the age of 85 on July 31, 1979, at his home in Las Vegas. His Rovatti cello was donated by his widow, the pianist and piano instructor Dorothy (Barber) Bolognini, to the Smithsonian Institution in Washington, D.C., where it remains in its permanent collection. Though a significant historical instrument in its own right, the cello's particular interest lies in 51 ballpoint pen signatures of famous musicians and entertainers, including Toscanini, Casals, Gregor Piatigorsky, Emmanuel Feuermann, Fritz Kreisler, Jascha Heifetz, Isaac Stern, Joseph Szigeti, Liberace, Jack Dempsey, Bruno Walter, Janos Starker, Eugene Ormandy, Ed Sullivan, and Miklós Rózsa, all obtained by Bolognini during his career.

The Las Vegas Music Teachers Association offers an annual scholarship competition in Bolognini's honor. His papers, manuscripts, scores, photographs, scrapbooks, and other collected ephemera reside at the Martha Blakeney Hodges Special Collections and University Archives at The University of North Carolina at Greensboro.

== Compositions ==
Cello solo

- Adagio
- Allegro
- Fiesta Basca - Lamada Montanesa
- Serenata de Bolognini
- Segoviana (1919)
- Serenata del Eco
- Serenata del Gaucho

Cello and Piano

- Argentine Rhapsody
- Ave Maria (In Memoria di mia Madre)
- Basque Airs
- Cantilena Antica
- Cello's Prayer "Preghiera di un Violoncello" (A mio padre Egidio Bolognini)
- My Prayer (Traditional Hebrew)
- Prelude and Fugue on a theme of Purcell

Cello and Guitar

- Mamita
