= Gregor Piatigorsky =

Ukrainian-born Russian and American cellist (1903–1976)

- Григорий Пятигорский
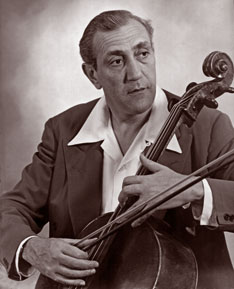
- Piatigorsky in 1945
- Born: April 17, 1903; Yekaterinoslav, Russian Empire
- Died: August 6, 1976 (aged 73); Los Angeles, California, US
- Occupation: Cellist
- Spouse: Jacqueline de Rothschild (m. 1937)
- Children: 2, including Joram
- Relatives: Daniel B. Drachman (son-in-law); Evan Drachman (grandson)

Gregor Piatigorsky (/pjɑːtɪˈɡɔːrski/; Russian: Григорий Павлович Пятигорский, romanized: Grigory Pavlovich Pyatigorsky; 17 April [O.S. 4 April] 1903 – August 6, 1976) was a Ukrainian-born Russian and American cellist.

== Biography ==
=== Early life ===
Gregor Piatigorsky was born in Yekaterinoslav (present-day Dnipro), Ukraine into a Jewish family. As a child, he was taught violin and piano by his father. But after being captivated by the cello at an orchestra concert, he was inspired to become a cellist. Piatigorsky constructed a cello made from two sticks, a long stick for the cello, and a short stick for the bow, and performed on it. Soon after, he received his first cello for his seventh birthday.

Piatigorsky won a scholarship to the Moscow Conservatory, studying with Alfred von Glehn, Anatoliy Brandukov, and a certain Gubariov. At the same time, he was earning money for his family by playing in local cafés, brothels and silent movie houses.

Piatigorsky was 13 when the Russian Revolution took place. Shortly afterward, he started playing in the Lenin Quartet. At 15, he was hired as the principal cellist for the Bolshoi Theater.

The Soviet authorities, specifically Anatoly Lunacharsky, would not allow Piatigorsky to travel abroad to further his musical studies, so he smuggled himself and his cello into Poland on a cattle train with a group of artists. One of the women was a heavy-set soprano who, when the border guards started shooting at them, grabbed Piatigorsky and his cello. The cello did not survive intact, but it was the only casualty.

Now 18, Piatigorsky studied briefly in Berlin and Leipzig, with Hugo Becker and Julius Klengel, playing in a trio in a Russian café to earn money for food. Among the patrons of the café were Emanuel Feuermann and Wilhelm Furtwängler. Furtwängler heard Piatigorsky and hired him as the principal cellist of the Berlin Philharmonic.

=== Family ===
Piatigorsky's first marriage, in 1925, was to Lyda Antik (born Lydia Feodorovna Chaliapin, 1901–1975). In his autobiography, he characterized it as "stormy," writing that "after nine childless years" it "ended in a peaceful divorce."

In January 1937, Piatigorsky married Jacqueline de Rothschild, daughter of Édouard Alphonse James de Rothschild of the wealthy Rothschild banking family of France. That fall, after returning to France, they had their first child, Jephta. After the Nazi occupation in World War II, the family left France on September 5, 1939, by boat for the United States from Le Havre and settled in Elizabethtown in the Adirondack Mountains, New York, where Piatigorsky had already bought a house. It was also his parents-in-law's first U.S. residence after their flight from France in 1940. Their son, Joram, was born in Elizabethtown in 1940. Piatigorsky had three grandsons by Jephta (Jonathan, Evan, Eric) and two by Joram (Auran, Anton).

=== United States ===
In 1929, Piatigorsky first visited the United States, playing with the Philadelphia Orchestra under Leopold Stokowski and the New York Philharmonic under Willem Mengelberg.

From 1941 to 1949, Piatigorsky was head of the cello department at the Curtis Institute of Music in Philadelphia, and he also taught at Tanglewood, Boston University. In 1949 he moved to California because a doctor had advised him to move to a better climate to stop Joram's constant colds and ear infections. Piatigorsky favored Los Angeles, because many of his friends, such as Rubinstein, Heifetz, and Stravinsky, lived there. He was a faculty member at the University of Southern California's Thornton School of Music, teaching there from 1962 until his death. USC established the Piatigorsky Chair of Violoncello in 1974 to honor him.

Piatigorsky participated in a chamber group with Arthur Rubinstein (piano), William Primrose (viola) and Jascha Heifetz (violin). Referred to in some circles as the "Million Dollar Trio", Rubinstein, Heifetz, and Piatigorsky made several recordings for RCA Victor.

Piatigorsky played chamber music privately with Heifetz, Vladimir Horowitz, Leonard Pennario, and Nathan Milstein. He also performed at Carnegie Hall with Horowitz and Milstein in the 1930s.

In 1965, his popular autobiography, Cellist, was published.

Piatigorsky died of lung cancer at his home in Los Angeles on August 6, 1976. He was interred in the Westwood Village Memorial Park Cemetery.

=== Instruments ===
Piatigorsky owned three Stradivarius cellos, the "Batta", the "Baudiot", and the "Lord Aylesford", which he loaned to Janos Starker from 1950 to 1965. From 1939 to 1951 he also owned the 1739 Domenico Montagnana cello known as the "Sleeping Beauty". Piatigorsky wrote: "I played the 'Batta' for a long time before appearing in concert with it. In solitude, as is befitting honeymooners, we avoided interfering company until then. From that day on, when I proudly carried the 'Batta' across the stage for all to greet, a new challenge entered into my life. While all other instruments I had played prior to the 'Batta' differed one from the other in character and range, I knew their qualities, shortcomings, or their capriciousness enough to exploit their good capabilities to full advantage. Not so with the 'Batta,' whose prowess had no limitations. Bottomless in its resources, it spurred me on to try to reach its depths, and I have never worked harder or desired anything more fervently than to draw out of this superior instrument all it has to give."

The "Batta" is displayed in a glass case at the Metropolitan Museum of Art in New York City.

== Appraisal ==
External audio
- You may hear Gregor Piatigorsky performing Antonin Dvorak's Concerto For Cello and Orchestra in B minor Op. 104 with Eugene Ormandy conducting the Philadelphia Orchestra in 1946 Here on archive.org

The violin pedagogue Ivan Galamian reportedly once called Piatigorsky the greatest string player of all time. He had had extensive personal and professional contact with many of the great composers of the day.

Many of those composers wrote pieces for him, including Sergei Prokofiev (Cello Concerto), Paul Hindemith (Cello Concerto), Mario Castelnuovo-Tedesco (Cello Concerto), William Walton (Cello Concerto), Vernon Duke (Cello Concerto), and Igor Stravinsky (Piatigorsky and Stravinsky collaborated on the arrangement of Stravinsky's "Suite Italienne", which was extracted from Pulcinella, for cello and piano; Stravinsky demonstrated an extraordinary method of calculating fifty-fifty royalties). At a rehearsal of Richard Strauss's Don Quixote, which Piatigorsky performed with the composer conducting, after the dramatic slow variation in D minor, Strauss announced to the orchestra, "Now I've heard my Don Quixote as I imagined him."

Piatigorsky had a sound characterized by a distinctive fast and intense vibrato and he was able to execute with consummate articulation all manner of extremely difficult bowings, including a downbow staccato of which other string players could not help but be in awe. He often attributed his penchant for drama to his student days when he accepted an engagement playing during the intermissions in recitals by the great Russian basso Feodor Chaliapin. When portraying his dramatic roles, such as the title role in Boris Godunov, Chaliapin not only sang, but declaimed, almost shouting. On encountering him one day, the young Piatigorsky told him, "You talk too much and don't sing enough." Chaliapin responded, "You sing too much and don't talk enough." Piatigorsky thought about this and from that point on, tried to incorporate the kind of drama and expression he heard in Chaliapin's singing into his own artistic expression.

== Works ==
Piatigorsky was also a composer. His Variations on a Paganini Theme (based on Caprice No. 24) was composed in 1946 for cello and orchestra and orchestrated by his longtime accompanist Ralph Berkowitz; it was later transcribed for cello and piano. Each of the 15 variations whimsically portrays one of Piatigorsky's musician colleagues. Denis Brott, a student of Piatigorsky, identified them as Casals, Hindemith, Garbousova, Morini, Salmond, Szigeti, Menuhin, Milstein, Kreisler, a self-portrait, Cassadó, Elman, Bolognini, Heifetz, and Horowitz.

== Partial discography ==
- Heifetz, Primrose & Piatigorsky (RCA Victor LP LSC-2563) RCA Victor Red Seal 1961
- Heifetz & Piatigorsky (Stereo LP LSC-3009) RCA Victor Red Seal 1968
- The Heifetz Piatigorsky Concerts (21-CD boxed set, original album collection) Sony-RCA 88725451452, 2013

== Chess ==
Piatigorsky also enjoyed playing chess. His wife, Jacqueline Piatigorsky, was a strong player who played in several U.S. women's championships and represented the U.S. in the women's Chess Olympiad. In 1963, the Piatigorskys organized and financed a strong international tournament in Los Angeles, won by Paul Keres and Tigran Petrosian. A second Piatigorsky Cup was held in Santa Monica in 1966 and won by Boris Spassky.

== Legacy ==
Piatigorsky's archives are preserved at the Colburn School in Los Angeles.

== Sources ==
- Prieto, Carlos; Murray, Elena C.; Mutis, Alvaro (2006). The Adventures of a Cello. University of Texas Press. pp. 249–251. ISBN 0-292-71322-3.
- Piatigorsky, Jacqueline (1988). Jump in the Waves A Memoir. New York: St. Martin's Press. ISBN 0-312-01834-7.
