= Sara Sothern =

American stage actress (1895–1994)

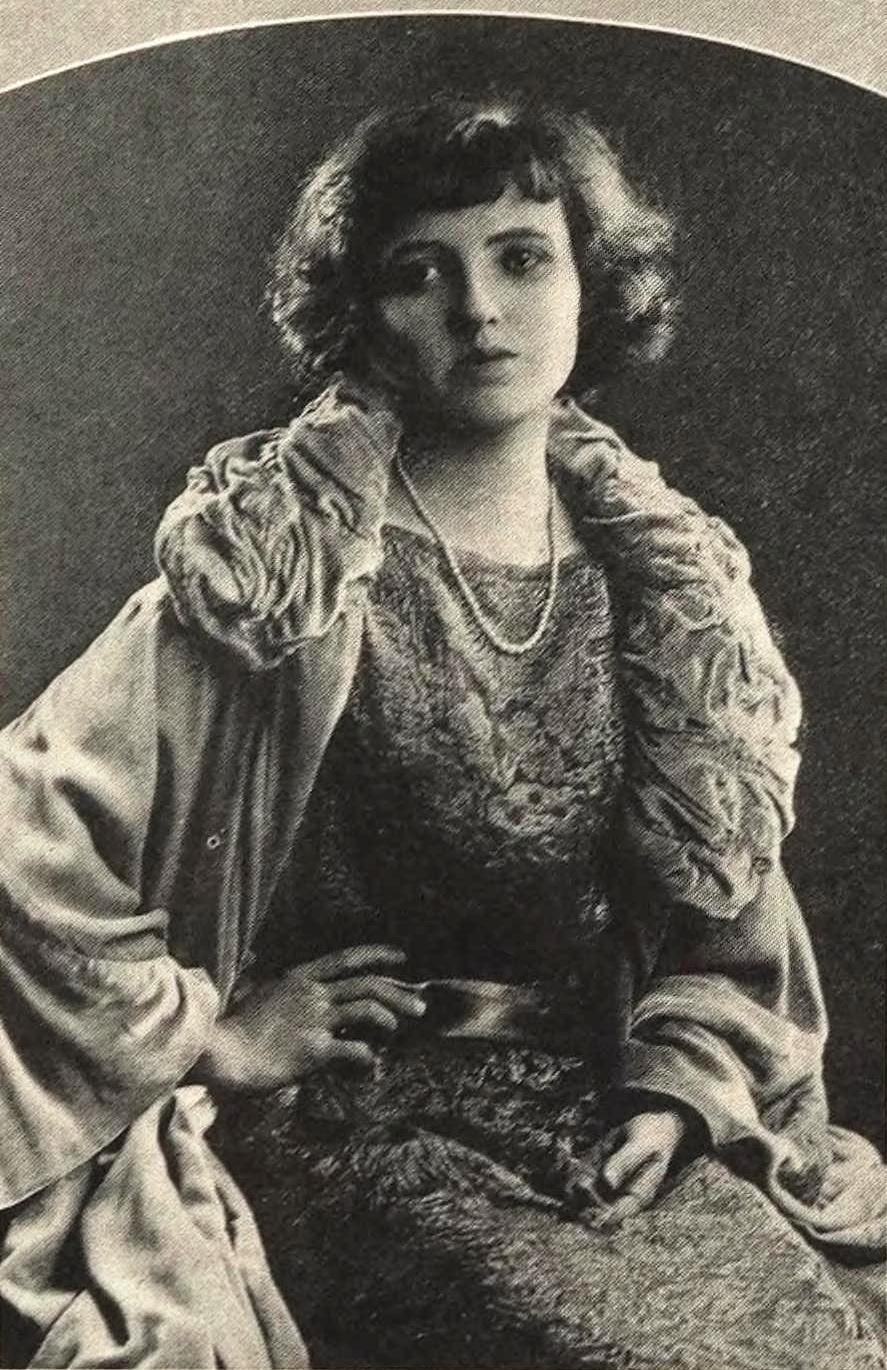
- Sothern in 1923
- Born: Sara Viola Warmbrodt; August 21, 1895; Arkansas City, Kansas, U.S.
- Died: September 11, 1994 (aged 99); Palm Springs, California, U.S.
- Resting place: Westwood Village Memorial Park Cemetery, California, U.S.
- Occupation: Actress
- Spouse: Francis Lenn Taylor (m. 1926; died 1968)
- Children: 2, including Elizabeth

Sara Sothern (born Sara Viola Warmbrodt; August 21, 1895 – September 11, 1994) was an American stage actress and the mother of actress Elizabeth Taylor.

== Life and career ==
Sothern was born Sara Viola Warmbrodt in Arkansas City, Kansas, as the third child and only daughter of the six children of Elizabeth Ann (née Wilson) and Samuel Sylvester Warmbrodt, son of Samuel Warmbrodt, from Switzerland. She had five brothers: Elmer S., Harold, Wilson Mantor, Harry Vincent, and Calvin S. Warmbrodt, four of whom died in infancy. Wilson survived to adulthood, dying in 1977.

Her film debut was on One of the Flames (1914) which was filmed at the Miller Brothers 101 Ranch in northern Oklahoma. Sothern was a seasoned actress by the time she made her Broadway debut in The Dagger (1925), followed by Arabesque and Fool's Bells that same year. She next appeared in Mama Loves Papa (1926). During this time, she acted in plays across the U.S., including the theatre venues of downtown Los Angeles.

She married art dealer Francis Lenn Taylor in 1926 in New York City. They were the parents of Howard Taylor (27 June 1929 – 31 August 2020), and the movie star Elizabeth Taylor (1932–2011). After marrying, Sothern retired from the stage and never acted again. After living in England several years, where her children were born, they returned to the United States. Living in Los Angeles, California, she devoted herself to her family and the movie career of her daughter.

Sothern died on September 11, 1994, less than a month after her 99th birthday in Palm Springs, California. She is interred in Westwood Village Memorial Park, Los Angeles.
