= Jacqueline Piatigorsky =

French-American chess player and artist (1911–2012)

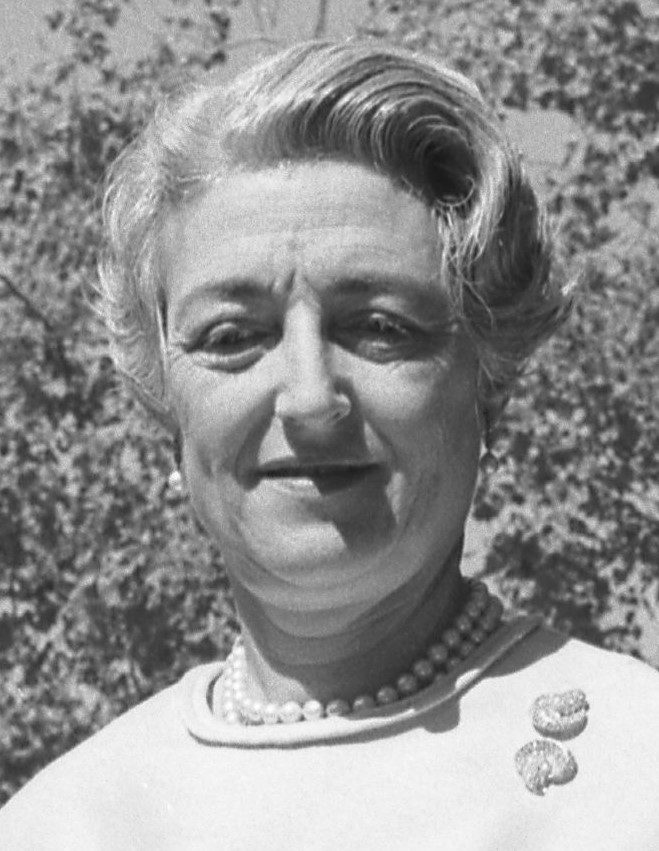
- Piatigorsky in 1966
- Born: Jacqueline Rebecca Louise de Rothschild; November 6, 1911; Paris, France
- Died: July 15, 2012 (aged 100); Los Angeles, California, US
- Spouses: Robert Calmann-Levy (m. 1930; div. 1935) Gregor Piatigorsky (m. 1937)
- Children: 2, including Joram
- Parents: Édouard de Rothschild (father); Germaine Alice Halphen (mother)
- Relatives: Daniel B. Drachman (son-in-law); Evan Drachman (grandson)

Jacqueline Rebecca Louise Piatigorsky (née de Rothschild; November 6, 1911 – July 15, 2012) was a French-American chess player, author, sculptor, philanthropist, and arts patron. She was a member of the Rothschild banking family of France.

== Early life, marriages, family ==
The daughter of the wealthy and influential banker Édouard Alphonse de Rothschild, and Germaine Alice Halphen, she was the sister of Guy de Rothschild and Bethsabée de Rothschild. She was born in Paris, France. De Rothschild was raised in the Château de Ferrières in the country in Île-de-France, and at a home in the city in what is known as the "Talleyrand Building," a mansion at 2 rue Saint-Florentin that today is part of the United States Embassy complex in Paris.

According to her 1988 memoir Jump in the Waves, her parents were cold and distant and left her upbringing to an indifferent nanny. As a result, she grew into a timid, near-reclusive, young woman who at age 19 married publisher Robert Calmann-Lévy (1899–1982), a distant relative. This marriage ended after five years in 1935, and two years later she married the renowned cellist Gregor Piatigorsky. Their daughter Jephta was born in France in 1937.

== Emigrates to U.S. ==
The family had to flee France in the wake of the Nazi occupation during World War II. Piatigorsky and her husband settled in a house Elizabethtown, New York, in the Adirondack Mountains which Gregor had bought before. It also became the first residence in the US for her parents and her sister Bethsabee after their flight from France to the US, and it was the place where their son Joram was born in 1940. They lived in Philadelphia for several years before moving to Los Angeles in 1949, where her husband taught at the University of Southern California. According to her autobiography they moved to California because the doctor had advised them to move to a better climate to stop Joram's constant colds and ear infections. Gregor Piatigorsky also favoured Los Angeles, because many of his friends such as Rubinstein, Heifetz and Stravinsky lived there.

== Chess successes ==
As an American citizen, Piatigorsky was a chess player of note, and was competitive at the national level. Her passion for the game of chess led to a second career during which she trained seriously, with coach IM Herman Steiner. She represented the United States in the first Women's Chess Olympiad at Emmen 1957, where she scored 7.5/11 on second board and won a bronze medal. In the 1960s, she was the highest USCF-rated female chess player in California and was ranked #2 in the United States, competing successfully in several U.S. Women's Championships.

== Chess patron, organizer ==
In addition to participating in the game, Piatigorsky became an important patron and tournament organizer. She sponsored the famous 1961 match between Samuel Reshevsky and Bobby Fischer, the top two American players. It was held jointly in New York City and Los Angeles, but was abandoned after 11 of the planned 16 games because of a scheduling dispute, with the score tied at 5.5 points apiece.

In 1963 at the Ambassador Hotel she staged the first Piatigorsky Cup in which world champion Tigran Petrosian and Paul Keres tied for first place. The California Chess Reporter called it the greatest tournament held in the United States since the 1920s.

In 1966, in Santa Monica, Boris Spassky won the second Piatigorsky Cup Tournament, with second place going to Bobby Fischer; this event had an even stronger field. She established the Piatigorsky Foundation in 1963 to promote chess, and through this foundation she served as patron for many young California players, providing funds for travel to tournaments, and organizing junior tournaments in the Los Angeles area.

== Sculptor, arts patron ==
Piatigorsky was also a patron of the arts, and in 1985 created an endowment for the New England Conservatory of Music to provide the "New England Conservatory/Piatigorsky Artist Award" which gave the recipient a cash prize and a series of concert engagements.

In her 40s, she developed an interest in sculpting, and arranged to take lessons from Anthony Amato. A Los Angeles-area gallery put on the first exhibition of her works in 1976. Widowed at the age of 65, she continued working and playing tennis into her 90s. As of 2003, she was still actively sculpting, and she turned 100 in November 2011.

== Death ==
Piatigorsky died from complications of pneumonia in her Brentwood home on July 15, 2012, at the age of 100.

== Sources ==
- First Piatigorsky Cup International Grandmaster Chess Tournament Held in Los Angeles, California July 1963 ISBN 4-87187-843-0
- Second Piatigorsky Cup International Grandmaster Chess Tournament Held in Santa Monica, California August 1966, 1968, edited by Isaac Kashdan, ISBN 4-87187-844-9
- See also the list of references at Rothschild banking family of France.
