= Daniel B. Drachman =

American neurologist (1932–2022)

- Born: July 18, 1932; Brooklyn, New York
- Died: October 24, 2022 (aged 90); Baltimore, Maryland
- Spouse: Jeptha Piatigorsky (m. 1960; died 2019)

Academic background
- Education: BA, 1952, Columbia College; MD, 1956, New York University Grossman School of Medicine

Daniel B. Drachman (July 18, 1932 – October 24, 2022) was an American neurologist. He is one of the founding members of the Johns Hopkins University's Department of Neurology.

== Early life and education ==
Drachman and his twin brother David were born to teachers Julian and Emily Drachman in 1932 in New York. Growing up, he played the soprano saxophone before switching to the clarinet on the advice of his music teacher. Drachman and his brother graduated with bachelor's degrees from Columbia College and Drachman went on to earn his medical degree from the New York University Grossman School of Medicine. Following this, he completed an internship at Beth Israel Deaconess Medical Center and residency at Boston City Hospital.

== Career ==
Upon completing his residency and internship, Drachman worked as a clinical associate and research associate at the National Institute of Neurological Disease and served as a clinical instructor in neurology at Georgetown University. He then spent six years at Tufts University School of Medicine before joining the faculty at Johns Hopkins University to work under Guy McKhann in 1969. As a professor of neurology, Drachman focused his research on myasthenia gravis and became the first to describe the receptor effect in myasthenia gravis. In 1976, Drachman and Sam Shapiro conducted the first successful transfer of certain features of myasthenia gravis from human beings into laboratory mice. Following this, Drachman co-discovered the first effective treatment for the most severe form of muscular dystrophy. His research team injected steroid prednisone into 16 patients with muscular dystrophy to slow the progress of the disease.

As a result of his research, Drachman was named director of the Neuromuscular Clinic and received the 1999 Solomon A. Berson Medical Alumni Achievement Award in Basic Science from the New York University School of Medicine. The following year, the Department of Neurology celebrated its 2000 Kroc Neuroscience Symposium in his honor. In 2003, Drachman became the inaugural recipient of the W.W. Smith Charitable Trust Professorship in Neuroimmunology. In 2014, Drachman was elected a member of the National Academy of Medicine (then referred to as the Institute of Medicine).

"Dr. Drachman was featured in a documentary movie ("Two Hands") on the botulinum toxin treatment of dystonia in the world-renowned pianist Leon Fleisher that was nominated for an Oscar."

== Personal life ==
Drachman married Jeptha Piatigorsky, daughter of cellist Gregor Piatigorsky and chess player Jacqueline Piatigorsky, in 1960. Prior to her death in 2019, they had three sons together. He died in 2022.
