= Francis Lenn Taylor =

American art dealer (1897–1968)

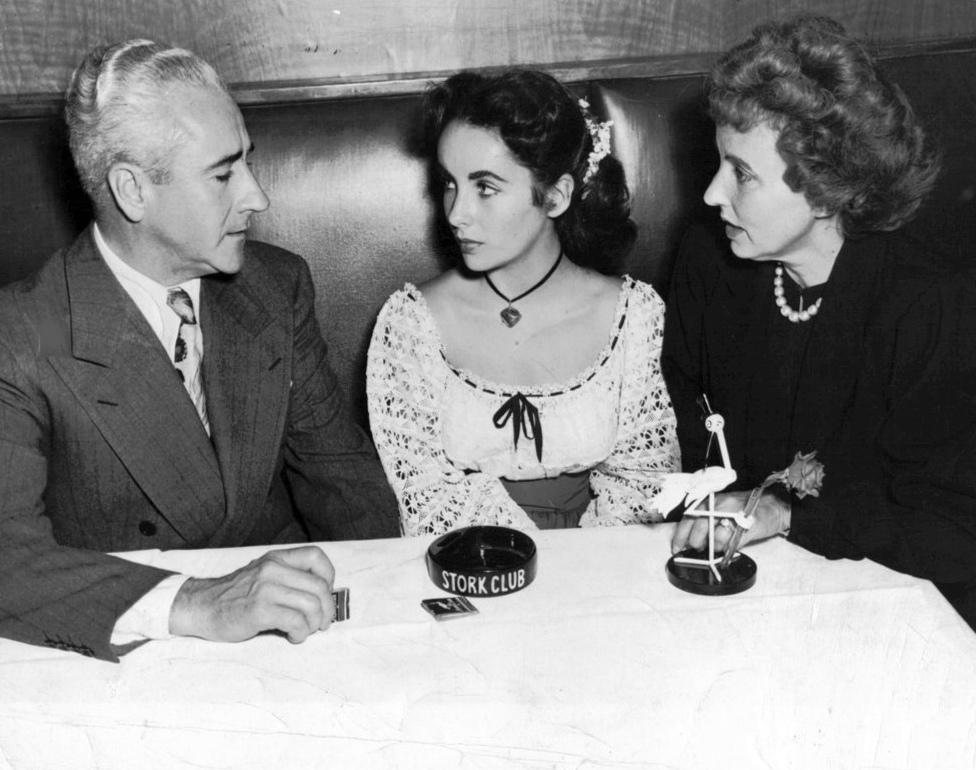
- Taylor with his daughter Elizabeth and wife Sara Sothern in 1947
- Born: December 28, 1897; Springfield, Illinois, U.S.
- Died: November 20, 1968 (aged 70); Los Angeles, California, U.S.
- Resting place: Westwood Village Memorial Park Cemetery, California, U.S.
- Occupation: Art dealer
- Known for: Being the father of Elizabeth Taylor
- Spouse: Sara Sothern (m. 1926)
- Children: 2, including Elizabeth

Francis Lenn Taylor (December 28, 1897 – November 20, 1968) was an American art dealer and the father of actress Elizabeth Taylor.

== Life and career ==
Taylor was born in Springfield, Illinois, as the fourth child and son of the seven children of Elizabeth Mary (née Rosemond) and Francis Marion Taylor. His brothers were David, John A., Francis M., Willie, and Edward Taylor. His lone sister was Mary Ellen Taylor. The family later moved to Arkansas City, Kansas.

Francis began dealing in art in New York City for a wealthy uncle by marriage, Stephen Howard Young, later, a friend of Dwight Eisenhower after World War II.

Taylor married stage actress Sara Sothern (whose real name was Sara Viola Warmbrodt and who was also from Arkansas City) in 1926 in New York.

They were the parents of Howard Taylor and Elizabeth Taylor.

Within a few years of his marriage, Taylor was transferred to Young's art gallery in London, England, where he and Sara lived for several years, and where their children were born. In April 1939, five months before the outbreak of World War II in Europe, they returned to the United States.

Taylor later ran an art gallery at The Beverly Hills Hotel in California.

He died at age 70 in Los Angeles, California. He is interred beside his widow in Westwood Village Memorial Park Cemetery in Westwood, Los Angeles.
