= Joram Piatigorsky =

American molecular biologist and eye researcher

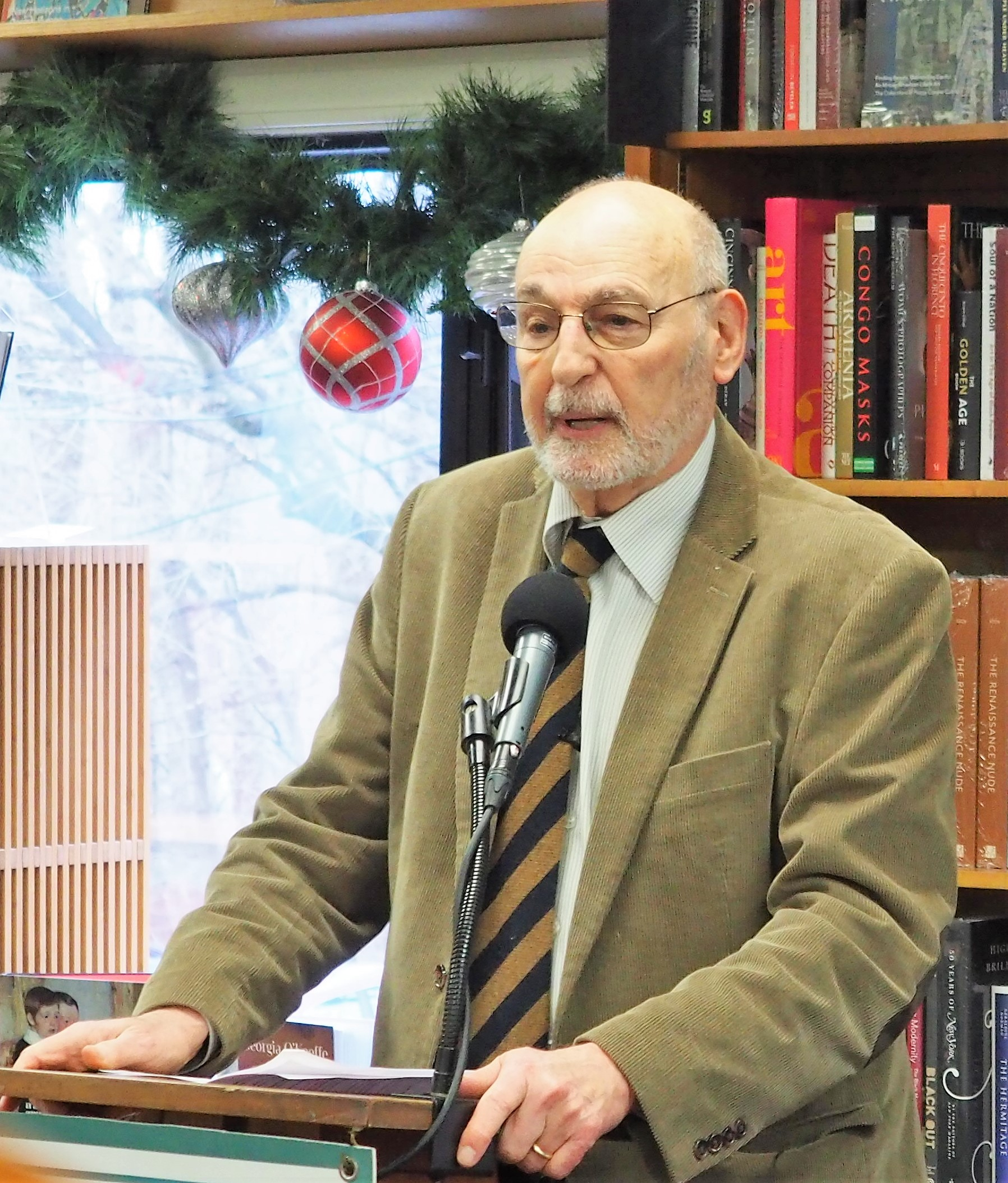
- Image of Joram Piatigorsky
- Born: February 24, 1940 (age 86); Elizabethtown, New York
- Education: California Institute of Technology; Harvard University
- Occupation: Molecular biologist
- Spouse: Lona Shepley (m. 1969)
- Children: 2
- Parent(s): Gregor Piatigorsky and Jacqueline de Rothschild

Joram Piatigorsky (born February 24, 1940) is an American molecular biologist and eye researcher. He was the founding chief of the Laboratory of Molecular and Developmental Biology, National Eye Institute, National Institutes of Health (1981–2009). He is the recipient of the 2008 Helen Keller Prize for Vision Research.

He is the son of cellist Gregor Piatigorsky and Jacqueline de Rothschild.

== Publications ==
Piatigorsky is the author of several books, including a scientific textbook, a memoir, a novel and a collection of short stories. Over the course of his career in science, he has published more than 300 scientific articles, reviews and book chapters on vision research.

In Gene Sharing and Evolution: The Diversity of Protein Functions (Harvard University Press 2007), Piatigorsky summarized and extended his "gene sharing" concept.

He co-edited a book on an international symposium he organized: Molecular Biology of the Eye: Genes, Vision and Ocular Disease.

His debut novel, Jellyfish Have Eyes (IP Books, 2014), forewarns of the danger of reducing funding for basic research, and has garnered positive reviews in the Proceedings of the National Academy of Sciences of the United States of America.

In his memoir, The Speed of Dark (Adelaide Books, 2018), Piatigorsky reflects on his 50-year career as a scientific researcher and describes how his family's pursuit of excellence and his father's quest for musical perfection influenced and inspired his own scientific career.
