= Hilary (musician) =

- Born: Hilary Blake; 1950
- Origin: Los Angeles, California, United States
- Died: July 2007
- Genres: New wave, synthpop
- Occupation(s): Singer, songwriter, performer
- Instrument(s): vocals, synthesizers and drum machines
- Years active: 1978–2007
- Labels: Sirius Records

Hilary Blake, known professionally as Hilary, was a singer-songwriter/performer from Los Angeles. She was born in 1950 and died in July 2007.

== Career ==
Blake sang with madrigal groups at Shakespeare festivals in England and studied acting with Agnes Moorehead at age 11.

In 1978 she matched free verse poetry with synthesizers and drum machines to produce her signature sound.

In 1982 she met up with producer Stephen Hague and pressed 1000 copies of 12" vinyl "Kinetic b/w "I Live" for Sirus Records. Kinetic was voted "Screamer of Week" by listeners of Long Island radio station WLIR on January 2, 1983. and received modest airplay on her hometown station KROQ-FM. Kinetic was also played in New York dance clubs. I Live was played on college radio stations.

Later in the year Blake released a 4-song EP entitled Kinetic for Backstreet Records which was also produced by Hague. The song Kinetic was about her hopes that awareness of changing cellular structure would help the human species to survive. Drop Your Pants was Blake's attempt to show how "ridiculous" the fear of sex in United States was. On August 4 it became her second song to be named "Screamer of the Week" by WLIR listeners. This song was also mentioned in an edition of The Guide to Getting it On by Paul Joannides.

I Live was a song about "the ordinary – living in the house of your own making" which Blake found to be profound. Goose Step Two Step reflected Blake's fear that the Nazi Party would reemerge. She was buried at the Westwood Village Memorial Park in Los Angeles.
