= Evan Drachman =

American cellist

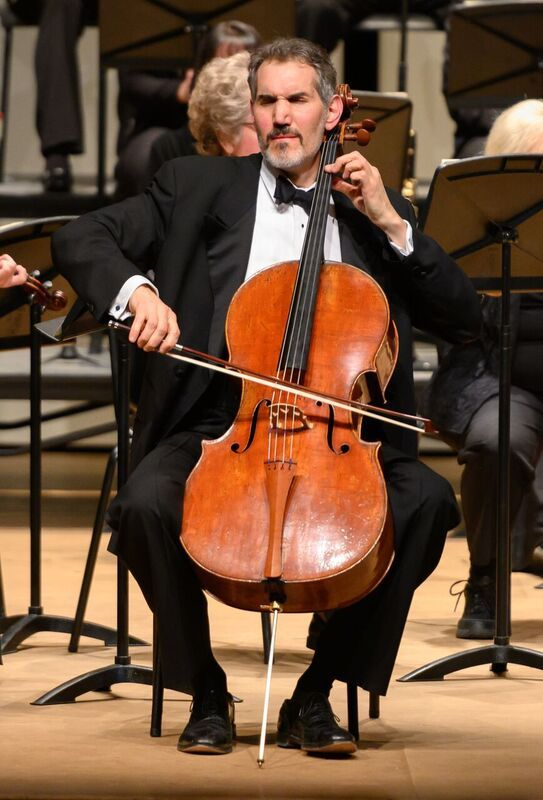

Background information
- Born: 1964 (age 61–62); Boston, Massachusetts
- Education: Peabody Conservatory of Music, Baltimore; New England Conservatory of Music; Curtis Institute of Music
- Genres: Classical
- Instrument: Cello
- Awards: 1982 Maryland Young Musician of the Year; 1982 Lubov Breit Keefer Award
- Website: Piatigorsky Foundation, pfclassical.org

Evan Drachman (born 1964) is a cellist whose musical repertoire includes both solo and chamber music performances. The grandson of cellist Gregor Piatigorsky, Drachman is the founder and artistic director of the Piatigorsky Foundation, and an authority on presenting live classical music to diverse audiences.

== Early life and education ==
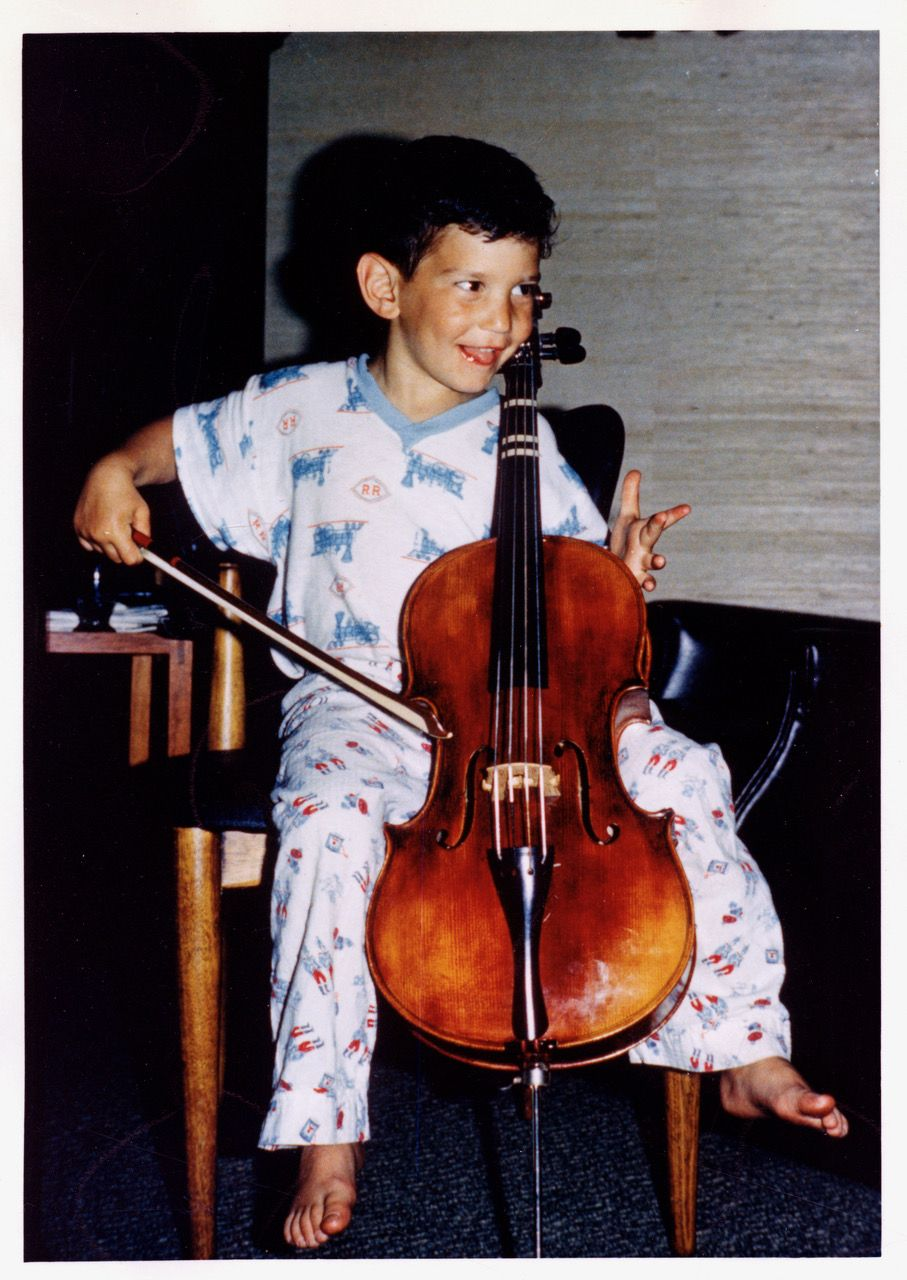
Evan Drachman as a child

Evan Drachman was born in Boston in 1964, the son of Daniel and Jephta (née Piatigorsky) Drachman, and the grandson of Gregor Piatigorsky. According to his mother, as a small child in diapers, he listened to his grandfather practice the cello, sometimes sitting outside the closed door by the hour.

In May 1982 Drachman was the winner of the Young Soloist's Competition for the State of Maryland, sponsored by the Baltimore Symphony Orchestra. In June 1982 he was honored with a Young Musicians of the Year award by Governor Hughes in the Annapolis, Maryland, State House, as well as the Lubov Breit Keefer Award from the Baltimore Symphony Associates.

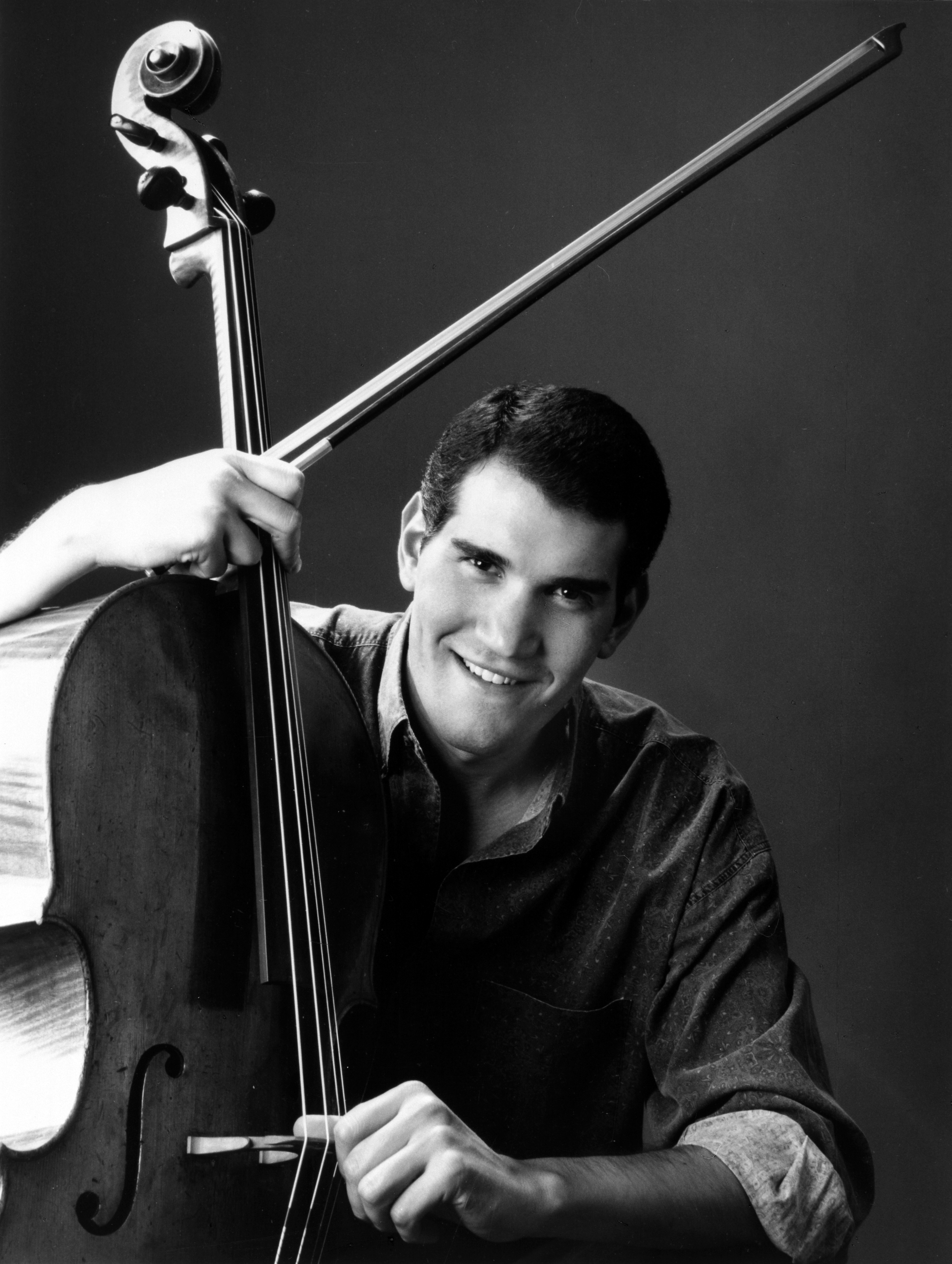
Evan Drachman as a young man

Critic Stephen Cera wrote of Drachman's 1983 performance at the awards concert,

"In the end, one performance proved worthy of the setting and the occasion: cellist Evan Drachman's rendition of Haydn's Cello Concerto in C... Though he took only one lesson from his famous grandfather, young Mr. Drachman's musical education has been in good hands... Mr. Drachman's account of the Haydn... was self-possessed, strong, intelligent and musically sensitive, and showed ample promise for future achievements."

Drachman studied at the Peabody Conservatory of Music in Baltimore with cellist Stephen Kates (who was a student of Drachman's grandfather) and also at the New England Conservatory of Music. He began studying with William Pleeth in the summer of 1982 at the Britten-Pears School for Advanced Musical Studies. In the fall of 1982 he moved to London to continue studies with Pleeth.

Drachman graduated with a B.A. degree from the Curtis Institute of Music in Philadelphia in 1998.

== Career ==
A May 2003 review reflected Drachman's relationship with his grandfather and his cello: "One of the most moving parts of the centennial concert came at the end, when a film clip showed a weary Piatigorsky taking his beloved cello out of its case, laying it on the sofa. The lights dimmed, then raised to show grandson Evan reaching for the same instrument, to play his grandfather's composition, Prayer."

=== Concert performances ===
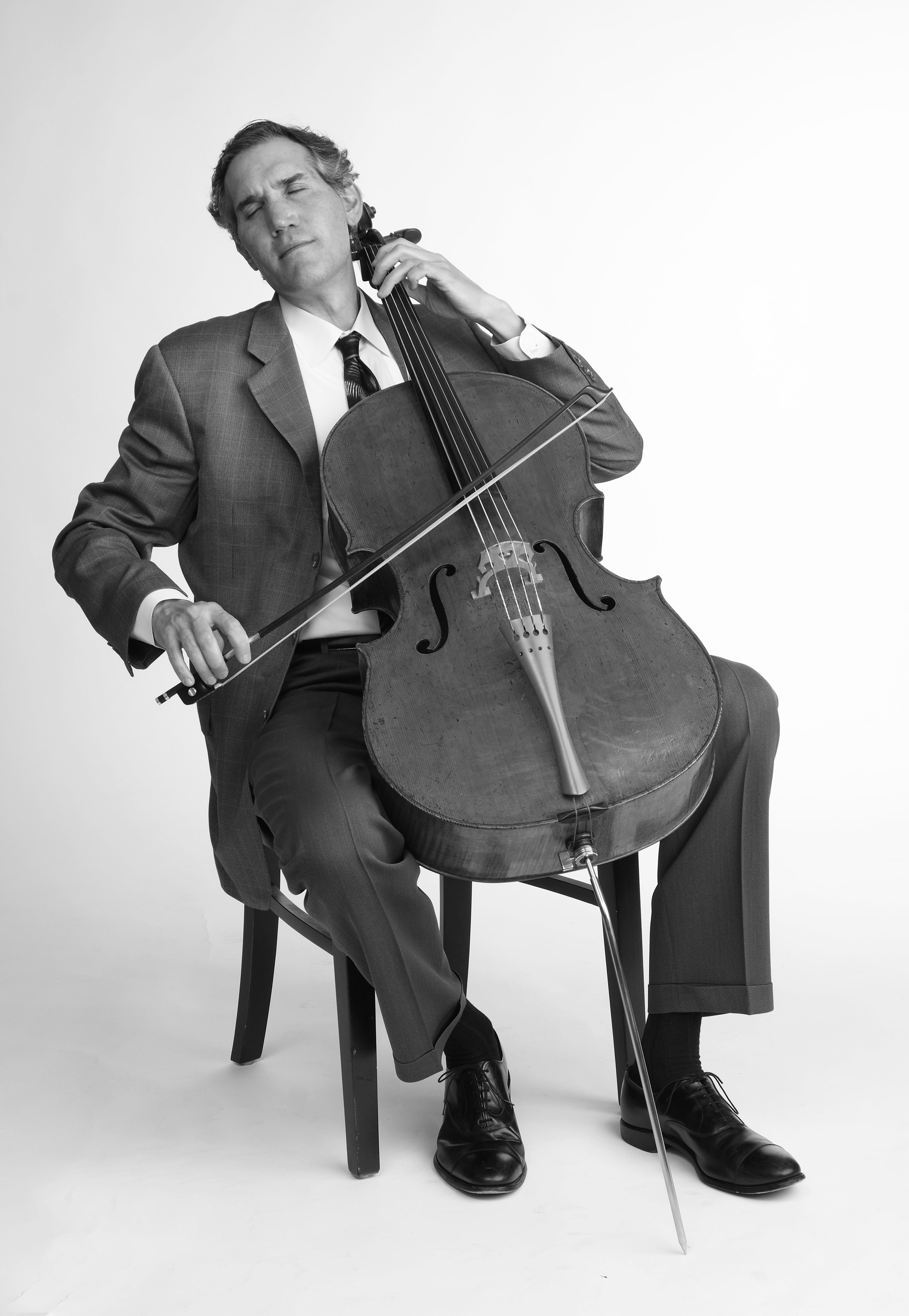

In 1994, Drachman traveled to Odessa and Kyiv to perform with the Odessa Philharmonic orchestra. In 1997, Drachman was invited to Russia to perform as soloist with the St. Petersburg Symphony under Maestro Mstislav Rostropovich. After a special 1983 concert with the Baltimore Symphony Orchestra at the Joseph Meyerhoff Symphony Hall, according to critic Steven Cera,

"...among those to watch in the years to come is Drachman, who last night performed Haydn's Cello Concerto in C Major... a smooth, mellow, highly pleasing performance of the Haydn. He had a firm command of the cello as evidenced by his skillful handling of the runs. Tall like the famous Piatigorsky, his stage presence also was impressive."

A West Texas performance by Drachman in 2014 included works by Fauré, Beethoven and Camille Saint-Saëns. A description of his concerts in 2016 said, "Drachman has appeared regularly as soloist with orchestras and in recitals and chamber music performances across the United States, Europe and Asia."

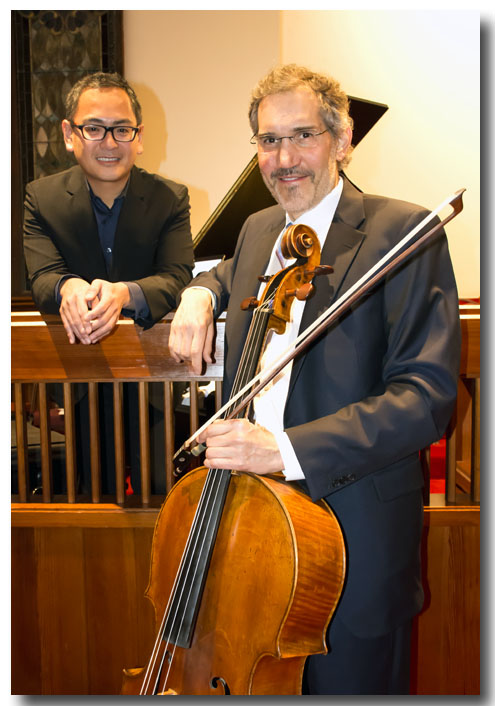
Victor Santiago Asuncion (pianist) and Evan Drachman

=== Recordings ===
In 1999, with pianist Richard Dowling, Drachman recorded A Frog He Went a Courting, his first CD. Critic Steven Wigler wrote, "Drachman possesses in abundance two qualities for which his grandfather was revered: the ability to make the cello imitate the human singing voice and, even more important, the ability to tell a story." Drachman and Dowling also released two more recordings: Infinity in 2004, and Romance and Revelation in 2007. Evan Drachman's CD Full Circle, with pianist Victor Santiago Asuncion, was recorded in 2012. Fantasy, also performed with Asuncion, was released in 2018.

=== Piatigorsky Foundation ===
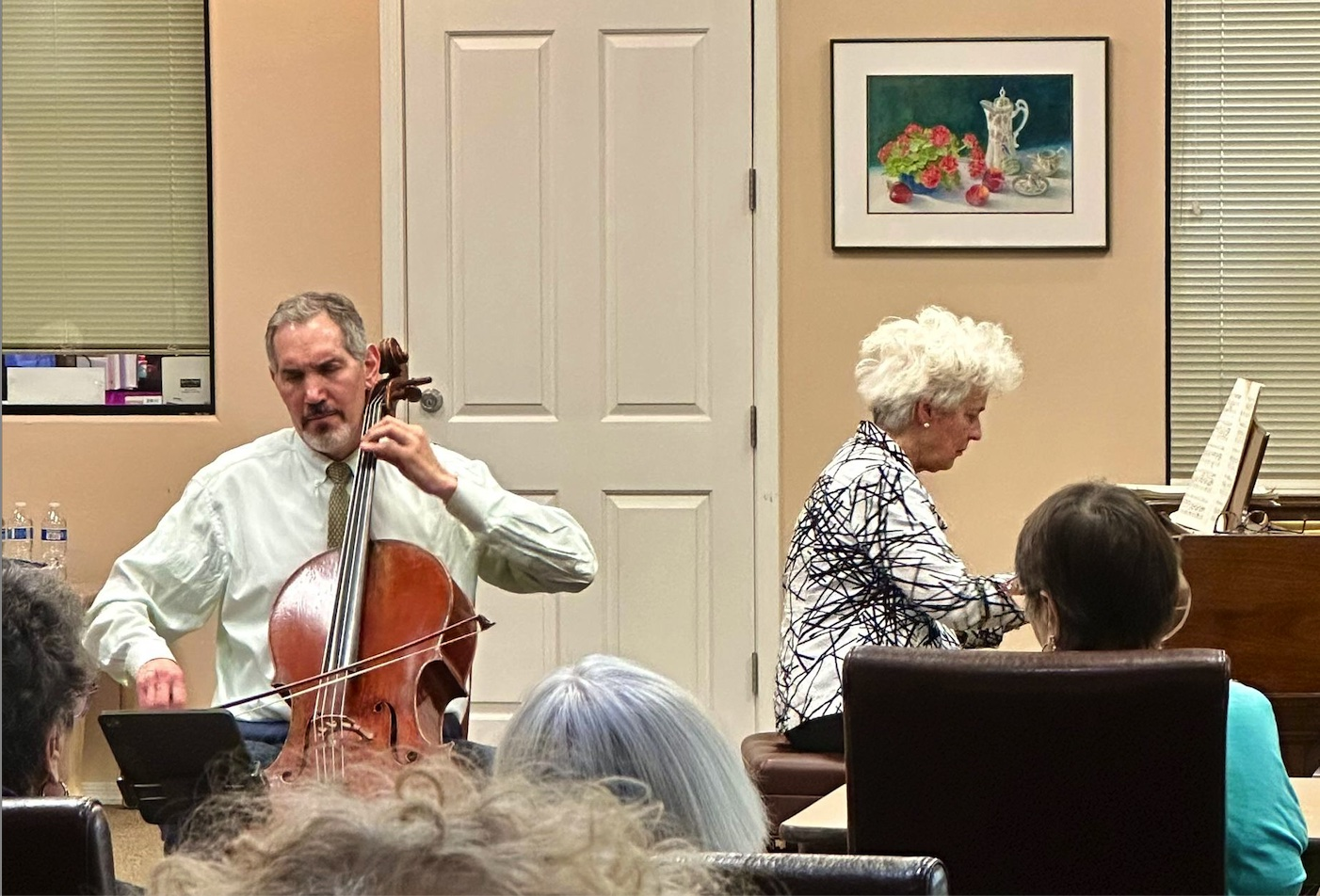
Evan Drachman and Lisa Bergman performing at the Tucson B’nai B’rith

Drachman established the Piatigorsky Foundation in 1990, as a New York nonprofit organization, founded to encourage cultural curiosity with accessible live performances.

The Foundation's mission was inspired by Drachman's grandfather, who believed music to be "neither a luxury nor a frill", and the power of classical music for healing and inspiration. Piatigorsky said, "Music makes life better. Music is a necessity... It is magnificent. And it is for everyone."

The Piatigorsky Foundation mission is to sponsor more than 220 free concerts every year, making live classical music part of everyday life for communities, with orchestras in performances across the U.S. and abroad. Drachman himself combines musical talent with his artistic vision, performing recitals, chamber music, and concerts.

Marjorie Centofanti wrote:

"...the Piatigorsky Foundation's commitment to artistic excellence and public outreach has fascinated many avid concert goers as well as curious first-timers. It is this combination of complimentary access, flamboyant performances and human warmth that makes Piatigorsky Foundation concerts so appealing to diverse audiences."

The Piatigorsky Foundation also sponsors performances by musicians other than Evan Drachman. Examples include clarinetist Igor Begelman and pianist Yoni Levyatov, violinist Qing Li and pianist Wan-Chi Su. A partial listing of Piatigorsky Foundation-sponsored performances in 1999 alone includes concerts from around the United States: in Anchorage, Alaska, Salina, Kansas, Burlington, Vermont, Baltimore, Maryand, Kilgore, Texas, and Longview, Washington.

Critic Matthew Richards wrote, "Drachman uses his talents for good", and "when high-poverty schools are being starved of enrichment programs", Drachman is considered to be "...one of this country's most respected authorities on the presentation of live classical music to diverse audiences".
