= Leslie Frankenheimer =

American set decorator (1948–2013)

Leslie Frankenheimer (née McCarthy; October 2, 1948 – January 22, 2013) was an American film and television set decorator. She shared in winning four Emmy Awards for her work on the following:

- Max Headroom (1987)
- Buddy Faro (1998)
- James Dean (2001)
- Carnivàle (2003)

== Early years ==
The Los Angeles-born Leslie McCarthy stated that her love for film scenery came as a child when she was allowed to accompany her mother to Paramount Pictures. She stated, "The sets were magnificent—everything in place and so character driven." She added, "I remember how fascinating it was to see these rich rooms held up by unfinished wood and 2×4s! I was very young, but I knew these people were creating magic and I wanted to be a part of it!"

== Career ==
Her first filmwork was on Falling in Love Again (1980). Around the same time, she received word that a second set decorator was needed in the art department for the film, The Blues Brothers (1980). She got the job from having experience as a store window dresser. She dressed the entire Dixie Square Mall as shown in the film.

Frankenheimer listed her three favorite projects were Carnivàle, Max Headroom, and her second film One from the Heart. Her biggest design challenge was with the Star Trek: Voyager episode "Concerning Flight", where she had to recreate Leonardo da Vinci's workroom as a holodeck program, due to all the detail and the research involved.

Franhenheimer was also nominated for an Emmy for her work on the short-lived series Emeril (2002), which starred Emeril Lagasse. Other television work included such series as The Partridge Family, L.A. Law, Scarecrow and Mrs. King, SeaQuest 2032, Star Trek: Voyager, The Closer, Kitchen Confidential, and, most recently, Ben and Kate, among others.

== Affiliations ==
Frankenheimer attended UCLA, the New York School of Interior Design, and the Art Center College of Design, where she majored in space design. She was a governor of the Academy of Television Arts & Sciences Art Directors/Set Decorators peer group.

== Death ==
Leslie M. Frankenheimer died on January 22, 2013, in her native Los Angeles, aged 64, following an extended battle with leukemia. She is survived by her husband, entertainment attorney John T. Frankenheimer, and their two children. She is interred at Pierce Brothers Westwood Village Memorial Park and Mortuary.
