= List of historic properties in Oracle, Arizona =

- CDP
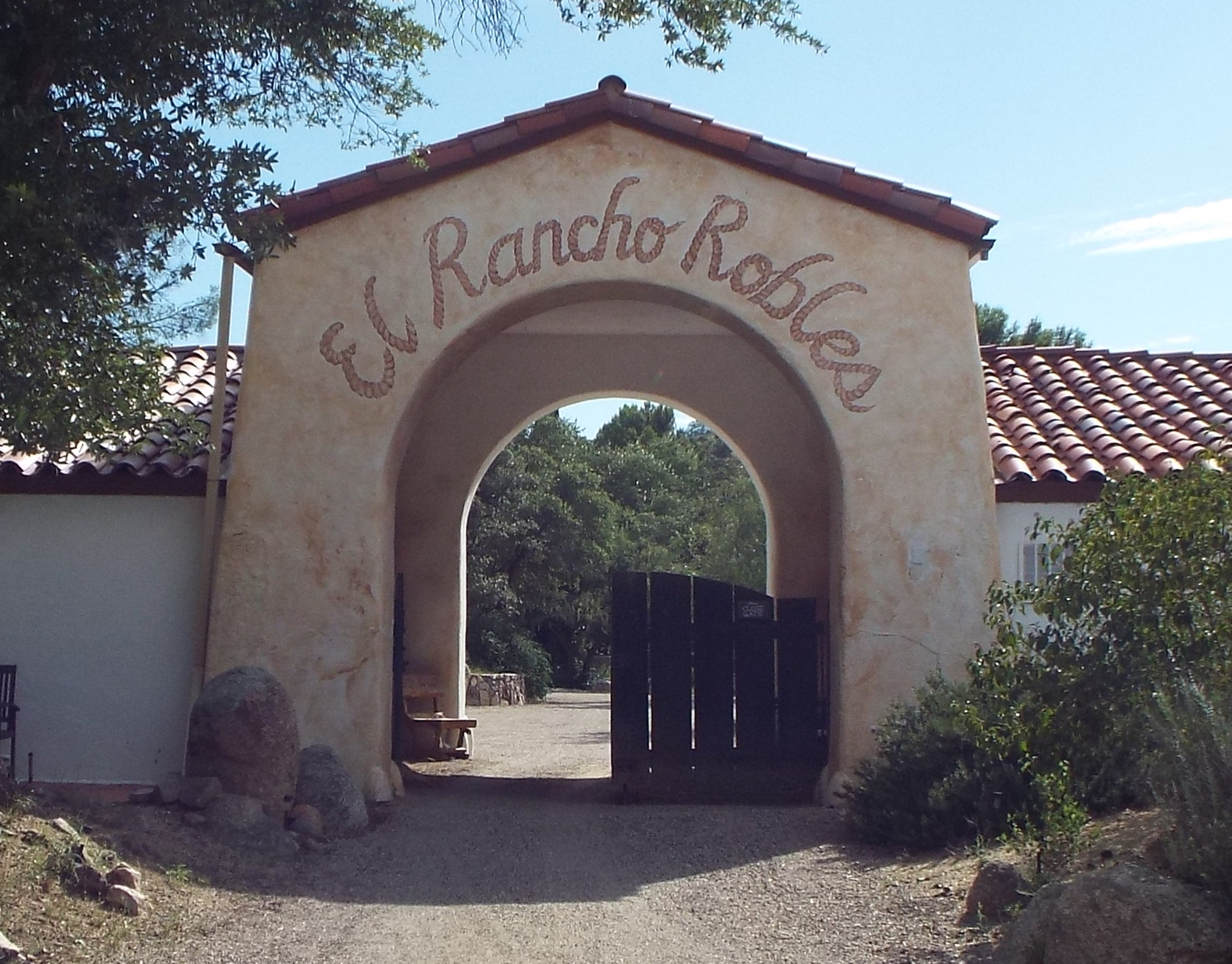
- El Rancho Robles

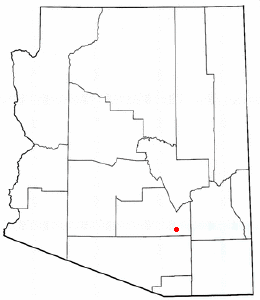
- Location of Oracle in Arizona
- Coordinates: 32°36′58″N 110°46′55″W

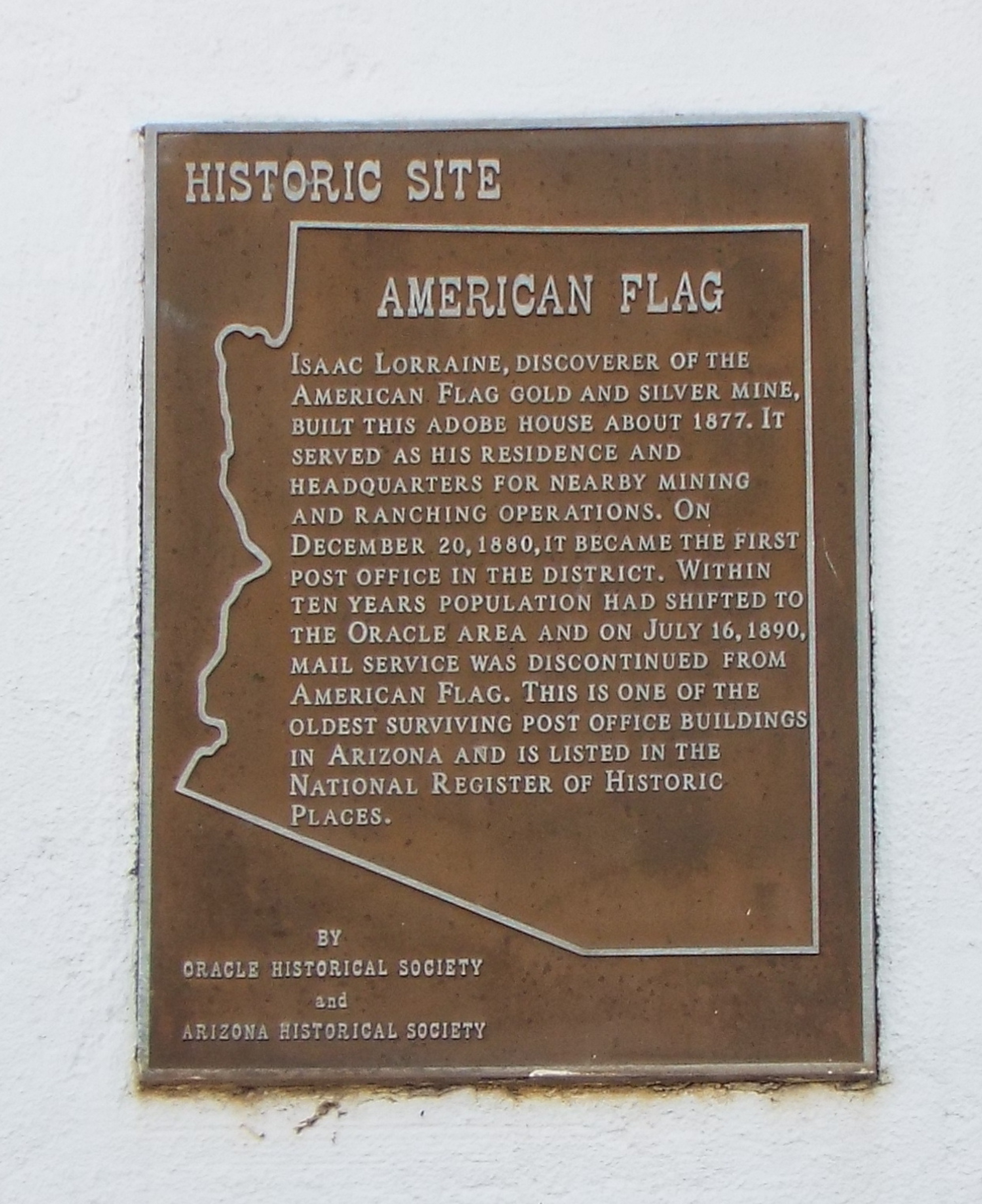
American Flag Post Office Ranch historical marker

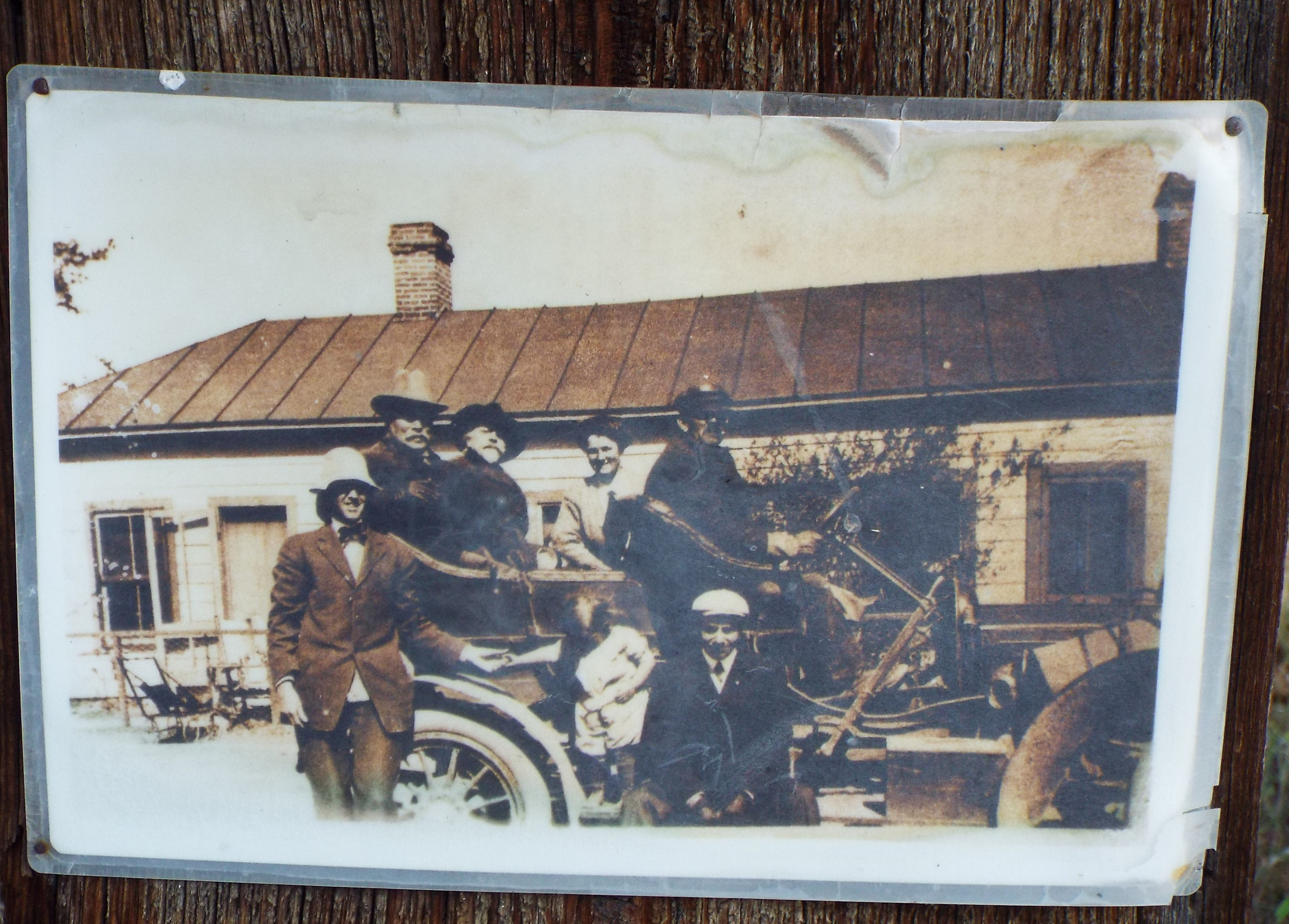
A pre-1917 picture of Buffalo Bill Cody and friends taken in his La Casa del High Jinks Ranch

This is a list of historic properties in Oracle, Arizona a census-designated place by the Catalina Mountains in Pinal County. Included is a photographic gallery of some of the remaining historic structures some of which are individually identified as historic by the National Register of Historic Places. Also included are some images of Biosphere 2 which is located in Oracle.

== Brief history ==
The first known inhabitants of the area were the Hohokam who settled the banks of the nearby San Pedro River in splinter groups. The disappearance of the Hohokam in the late 15th century remains a mystery. Later the region was settled by the O’odham (Sobapiris) and the Apache tribes. The Sobaipuris and Apache fought each other over the ownership of the land. The Sobapiris gave up the struggle and relocated to the San Xavier Mission, home to the Tohono O’odham Nation to the south.

The area came under Spanish rule in what Spain claimed was New Spain. The first Europeans arrived in the region in 1583, when a group of Spanish explorers came in search of gold and silver. They were searching for the Seven Cities of Cibola, whose streets were supposed to be paved with gold. The region was known as "Apachería" by the Spaniards In 1821, the Mexican War of Independence between Mexico and Spain came to an end and the territory of New Spain, which included Arizona, was ceded to Mexico.

In 1846, the United States declared war against Mexico in what became known as the Mexican–American War. The conflict with Mexico ended in 1848. In 1854, the United States purchased the region from Mexico in what is known as the Gadsden Purchase. In 1870, a Group of vigilantes from Tucson massacred 200 Apache women, children and elders at Aravaipa Creek. Those who survived the massacre moved to the San Carlos Reservation.

The early Mexican settlers used the land for agricultural purposes and for cattle ranching. As such, the economy of the area depended on cattle ranching and later mining. Albert Weldon and Isaac Lorraine were among the first Anglo's from the eastern coast of the United States to claim mining rights in the area. Lorraine founded a mine which he named the "American Flag Mine". He also established the American Flag cattle ranch. Weldon was a prospector who established a mine in the Catalina Mountains which he named "The Oracle", in honor of his uncle's ship. The small town was named Oracle in 1878.

In the 1870s word of the mining successes in the area spread and prospectors from other places came with their families to the area. In 1880, two post offices were established, one in Oracle and one 5 miles west of Oracle which was called the American Flag Post Office. The American Flag Post Office service was discontinued in 1890. Currently it is the oldest existing Territorial post office in the state that is still standing.

The climate of Oracle was another factor that attracted people for health reasons. Oracle was mentioned in a medical journal as an ideal place where the fresh air would restore the health of those suffering from "consumption" the name given to tuberculosis. In the 1880s the Dodge family built the Arcadia Ranch as a sheep ranch and boarding house to accommodate those who were suffering from lung diseases.

In 1895, the Neal family built the Mountain View Hotel on what is now the American Way Road. The building was made with a thousand adobe bricks which were made on site. It took six months to build. The hotel attracted visitors from different parts of the world.

A celebrity who resided in Oracle was William Cody known as "Buffalo Bill Cody". Cody was together with one of his friends, Nate Salsbury (1846–1902) who had a ranch in the town of Dateland, Arizona, owners of the Buffalo Bill Wild West Show. Upon Cody's retirement from the show, he invested in a mine in the Campo Bonito area of the Catalina Mountains. He named the mine "High Jinks" and would often stay either in the Mountain View Hotel or Arcadia Ranch. He established a ranch in 1912 which he named "La Casa del High Jinks". He visited his ranch where he would reside until his death in 1917.

== Oracle Historical Society ==
The Oracle Historical Society, Inc. was founded in 1977 and is located at 825 East Mountain Lemmon Highway where the Arcadia Ranch was once located. The mission of the society is to "preserve historical artifacts and properties; to educate, to encourage awareness and appreciation of the unique cultural-historical heritage of the community of Oracle and surrounding areas; and to promote alliances that enhance the Society’s ability to influence the future by honoring the past."

The settlement of Oracle does not have the authority to deny a demolition permit. Therefore, the owner of a property, listed either in the National Register of Historic Places or considered historical by the Camp Verde Historical Society, may demolish the historical property in question if desired. According to Jim McPherson, Arizona Preservation Foundation Board President:

"It is crucial that residents, private interests, and government officials act now to save these elements of our cultural heritage before it is too late.”

An example is the Mountain View Hotel. It was incorporated into a Baptist church and its outbuildings were torn down and it was stripped of its balconies.

== Historic building and churches pictured ==
Pictured is the Mountain View Hotel and two historical churches.

- Mountain View Hotel – established in 1895 and located at 1175 N Appleton Dr. The hotel was incorporated into a Baptist church in the 1950s. In 2022, the property was purchased by Amy Bonillas and her father Garry Davis.
- Oracle Union Church – established in 1901 and located at 705 East American Way. The church was previously known as the "All Saints' Church". It was listed in the National Register of Historic Places on May 3, 1984, reference: #84000768.
- St. Helen's Mission Church – established in 1927 and located at 66 E Maplewood Street.
Building and churches

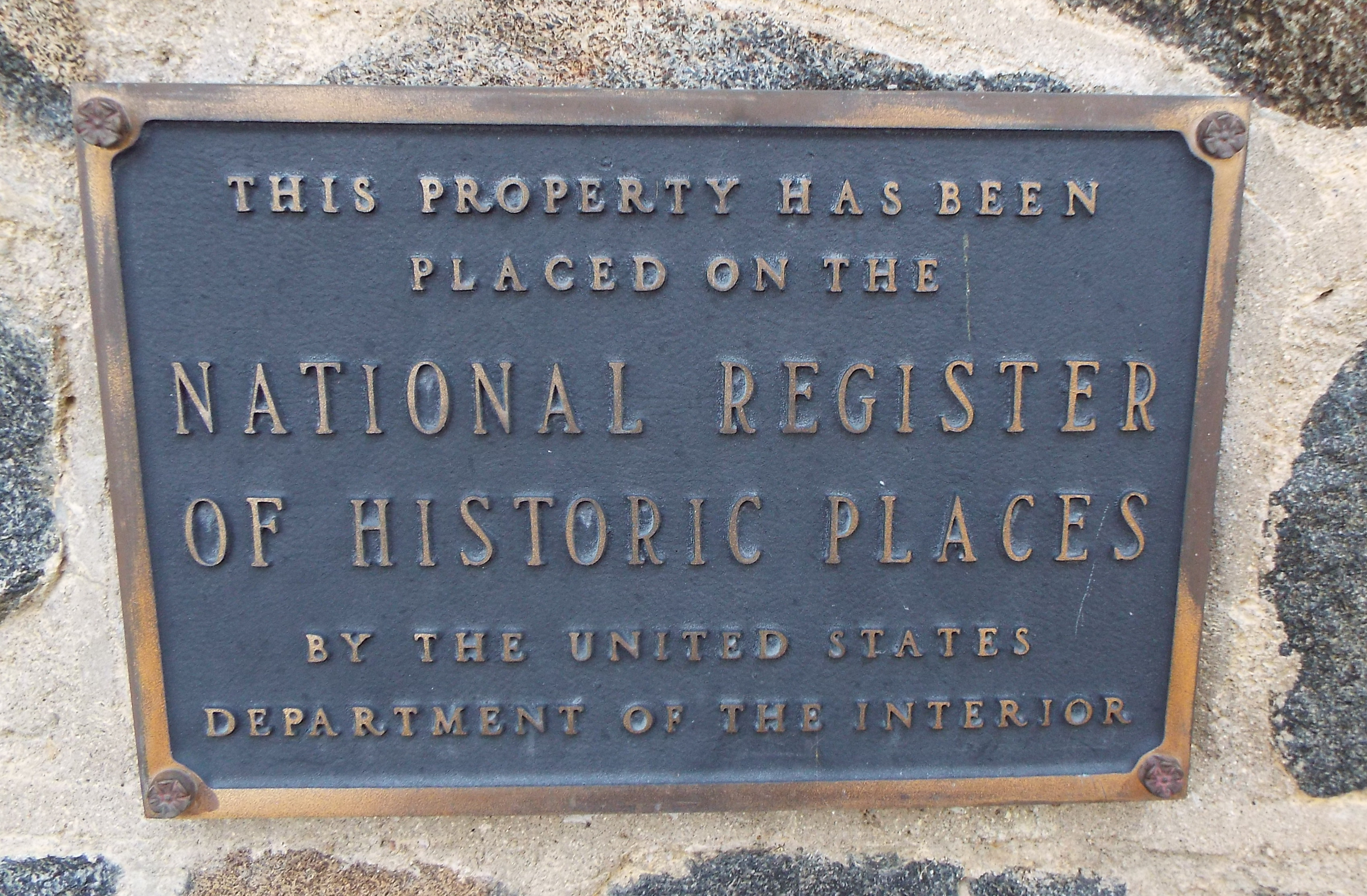
Oracle Union Church marker

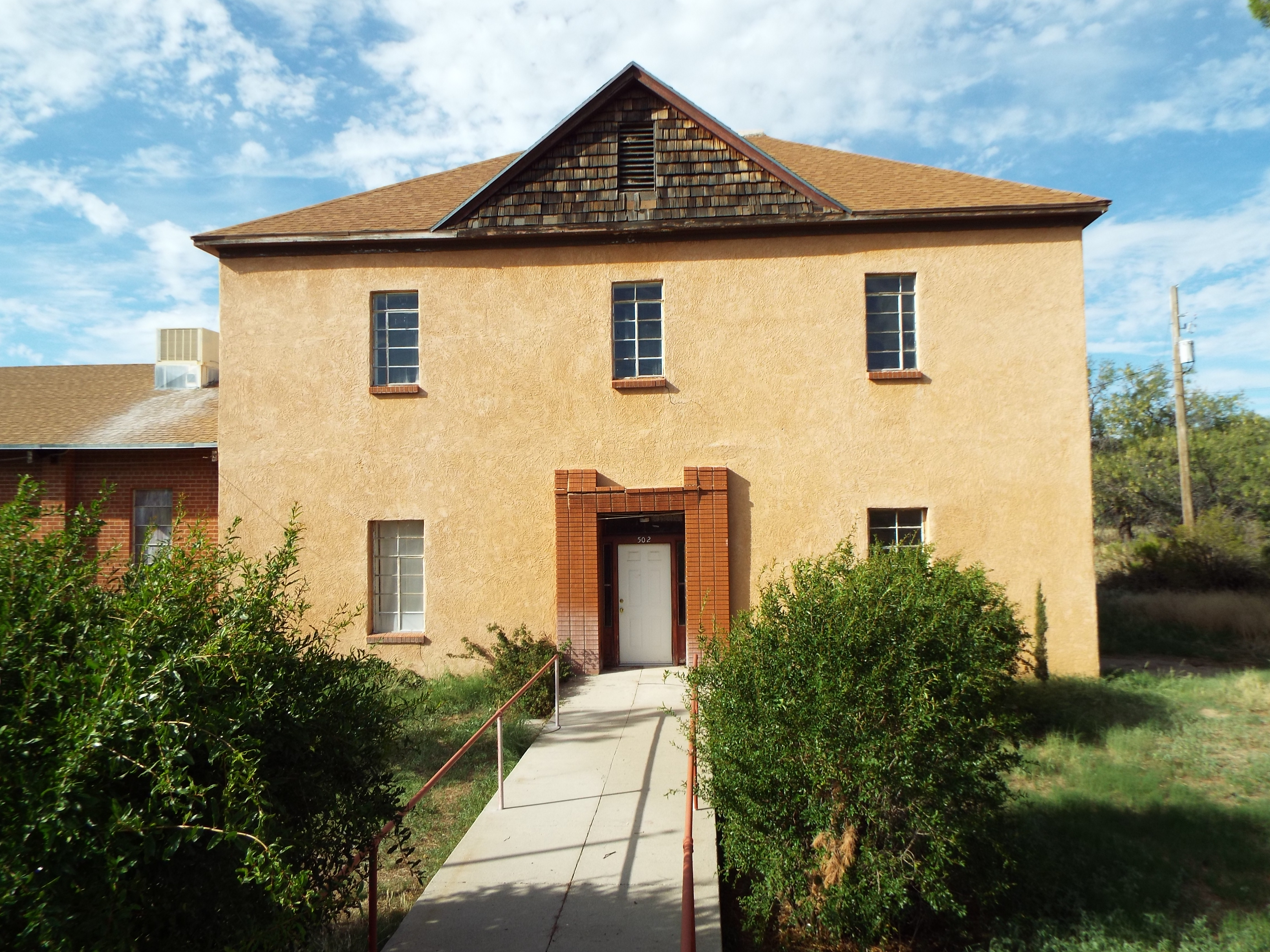
Mountain View Hotel

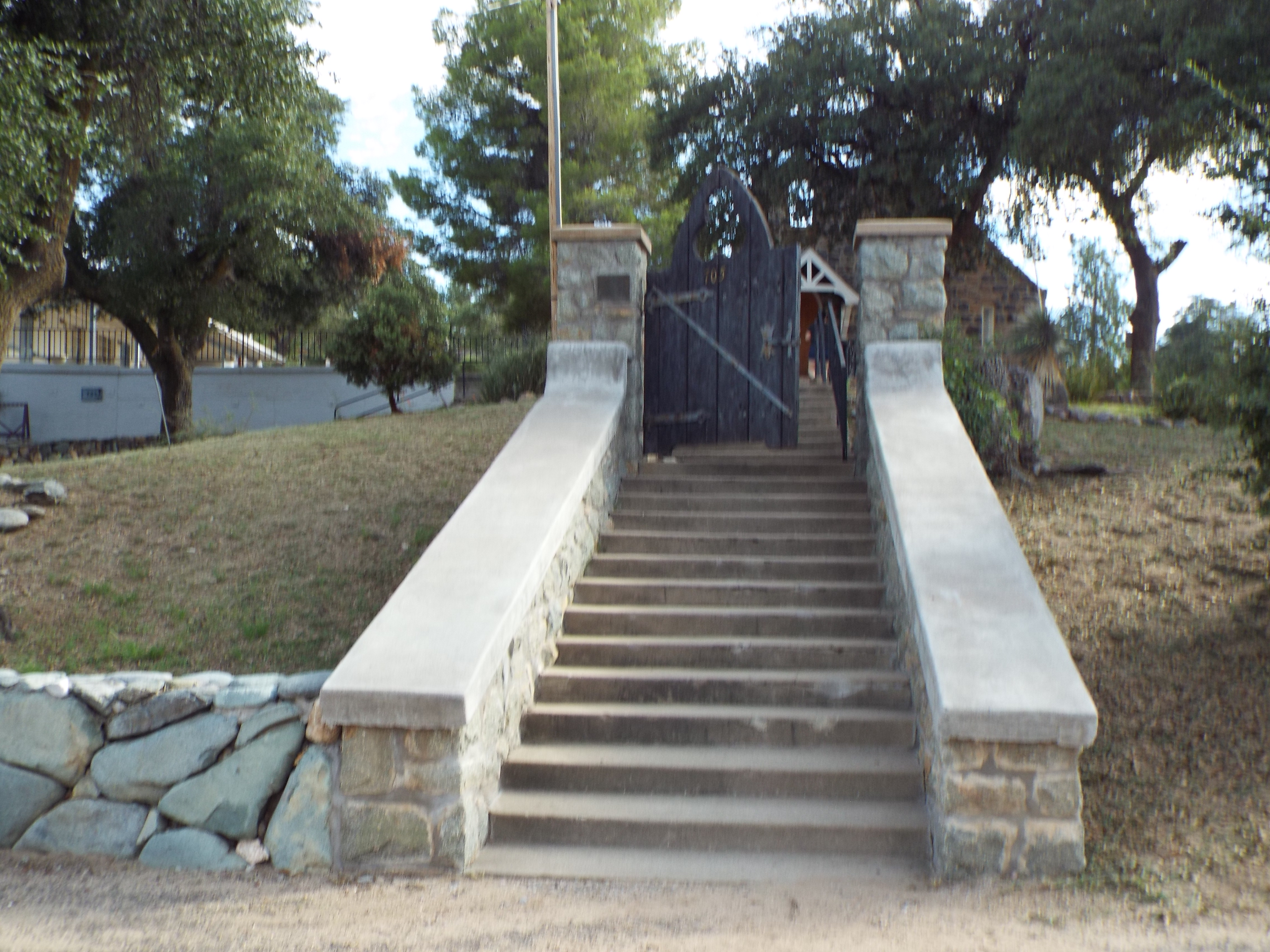
Oracle Union Church stairs

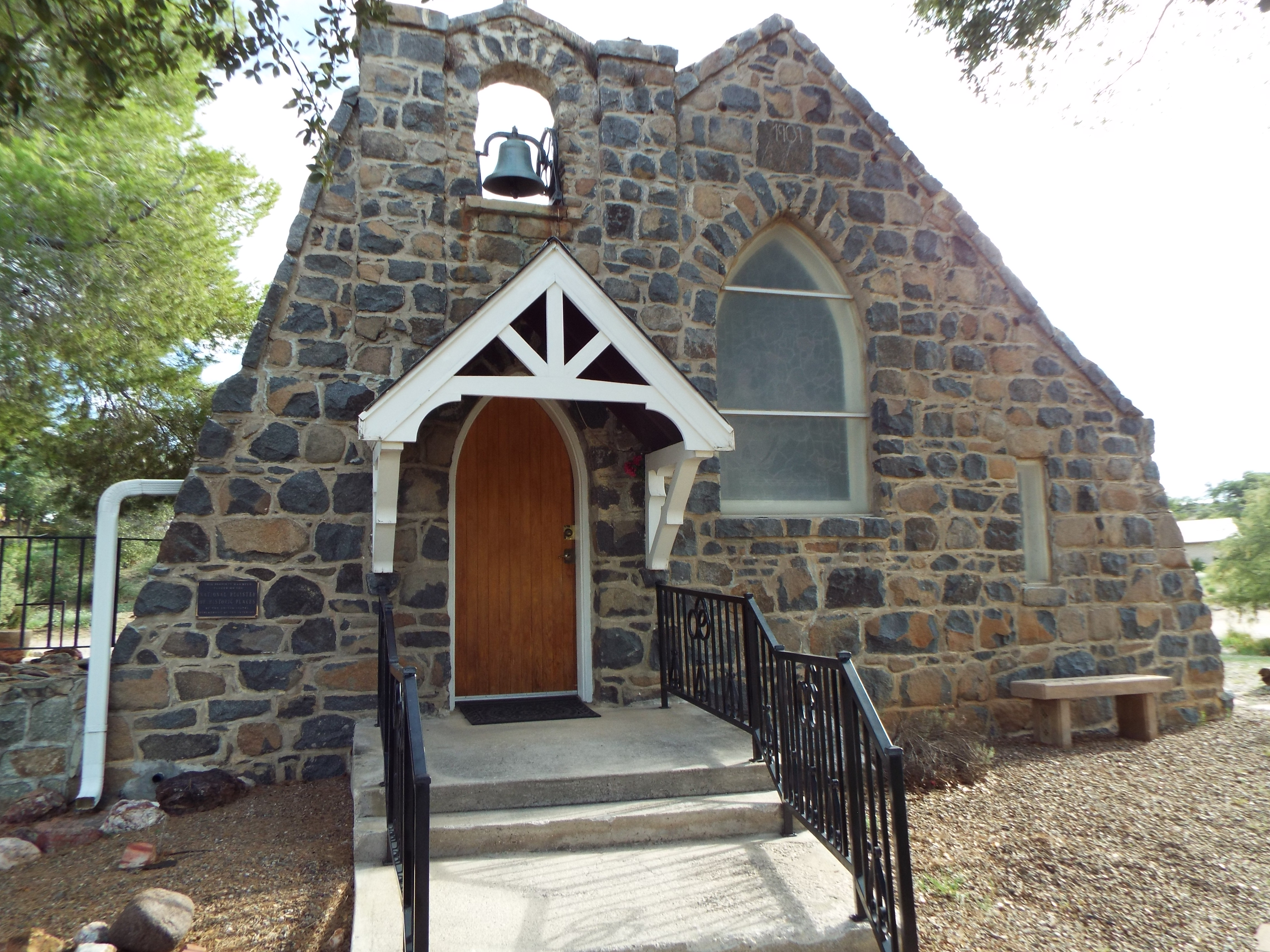
Oracle Union Church

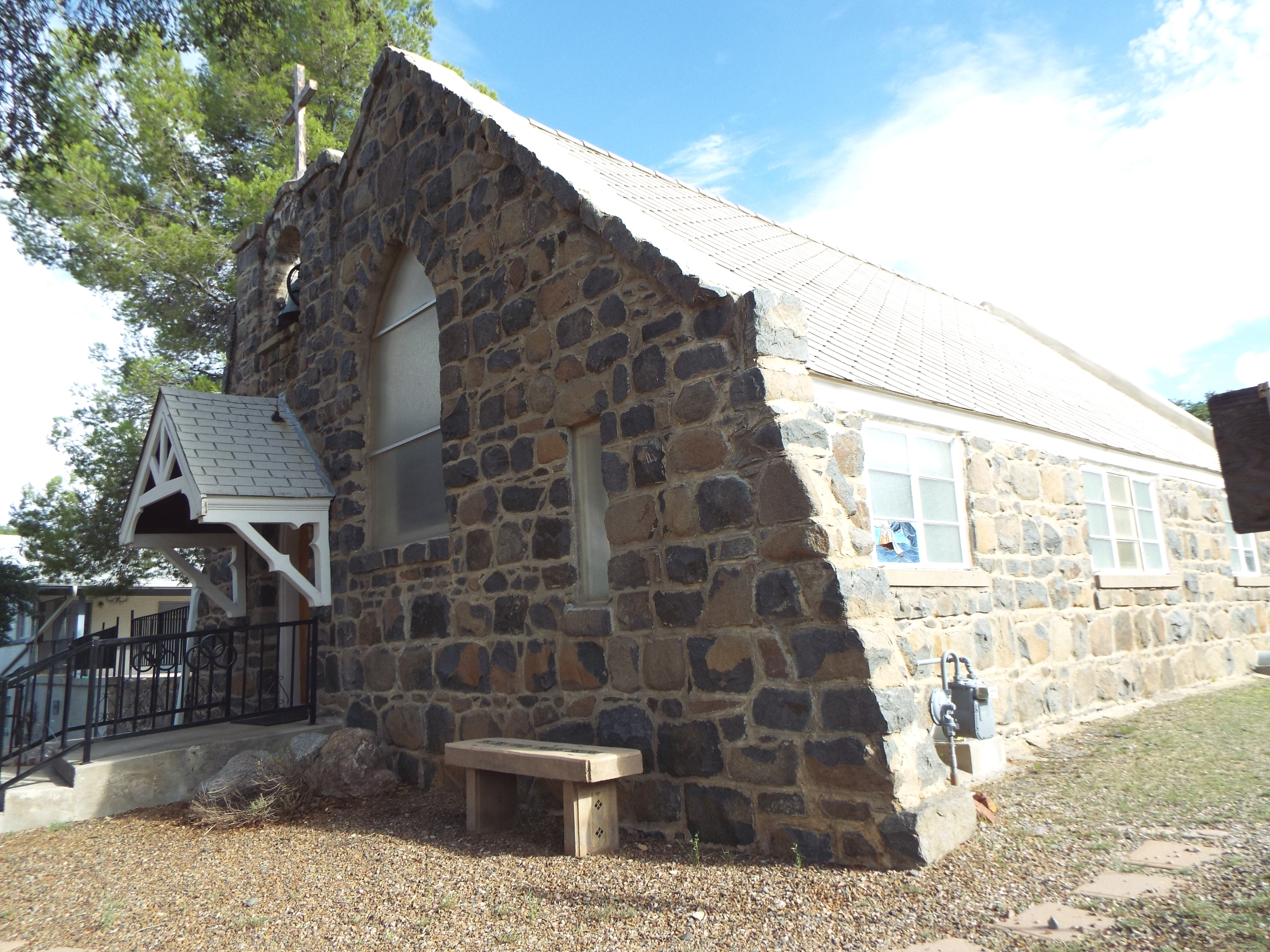
Oracle Union Church

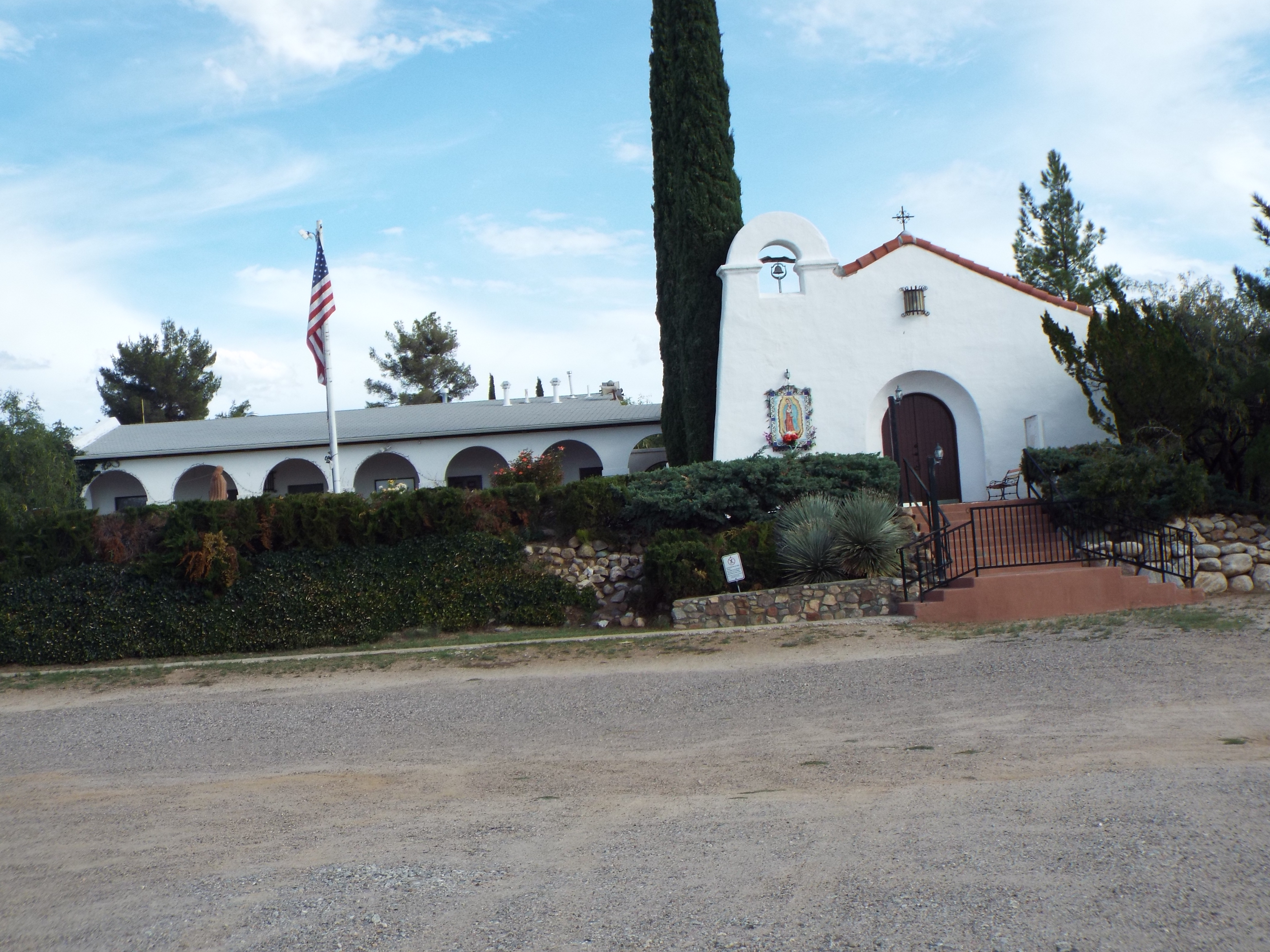
St. Helen's Mission Church

== Historic ranches ==
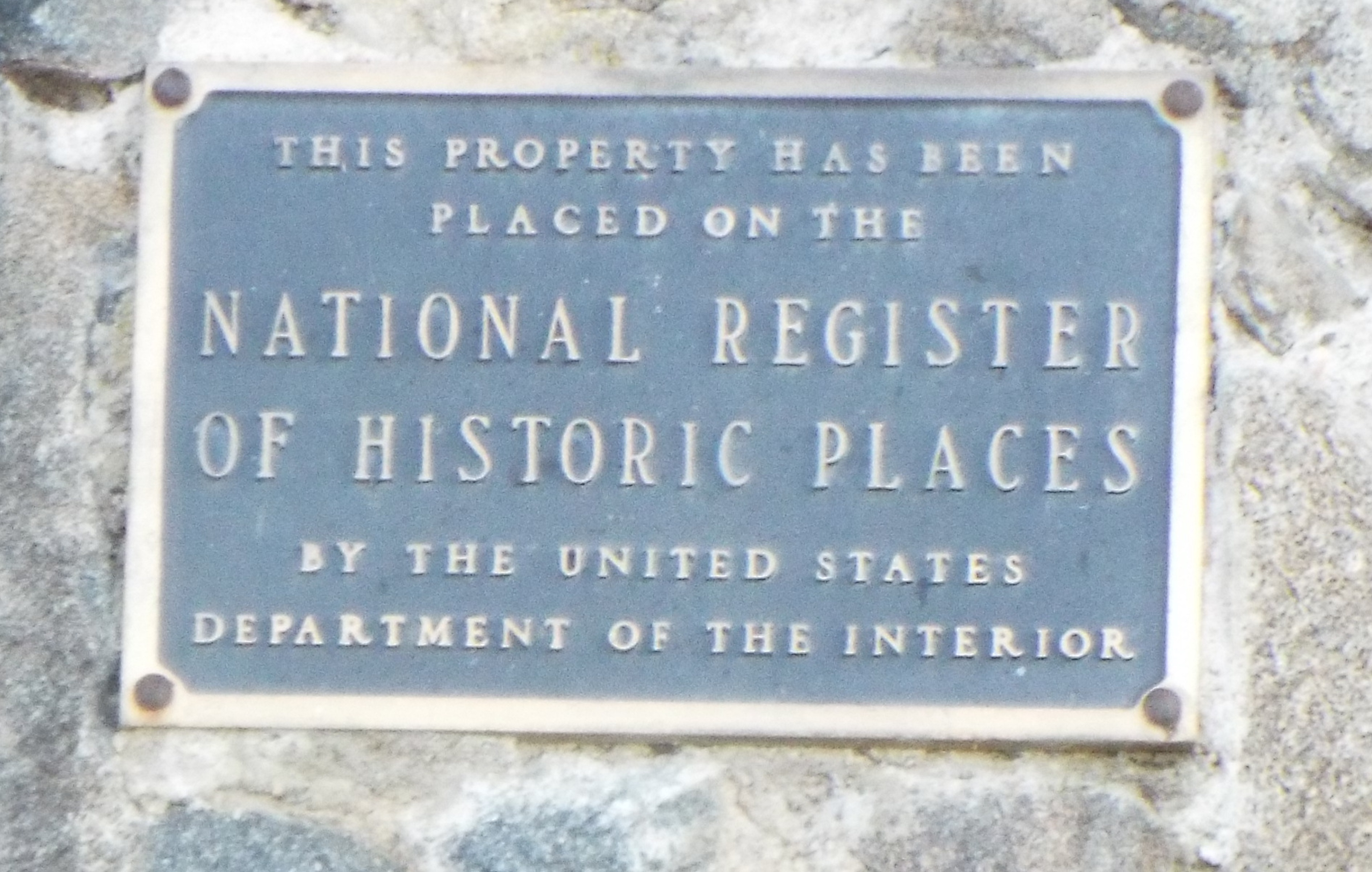
Acadia Ranch Marker

The ranches pictured are the following:

- The C.O.D. Ranch – established in 1879 and located on COD Road.
- The American Flag Post Office Ranch – established in 1880 and located 5 miles southeast of Oracle on Lemmon Road one mile south of Webb Road. It was listed in the National Register of Historic Places on June 20, 1979, reference: #79000426.
- The Acadia Ranch – established in 1880 and located at 825 East Mount Lemmon Highway. It was listed in the National Register of Historic Places on February 22, 1984, reference: #84000765.
- El Rancho Robles – established in 1910 and located at 1170 N Rancho Robles Road. Within a few years it was to become one of the area's most popular dude ranches.
- Rancho Linda Vista – established in 1920 and located at West Linda Vista Road. The 1924, silent movie "The Mine with the Iron Door" was filmed there. In 1967, the ranch was converted into an artist community by a group of artists largely affiliated with the University of Arizona. It was listed in the National Register of Historic Places on September 9, 1999, reference: #99001099.
Ranches

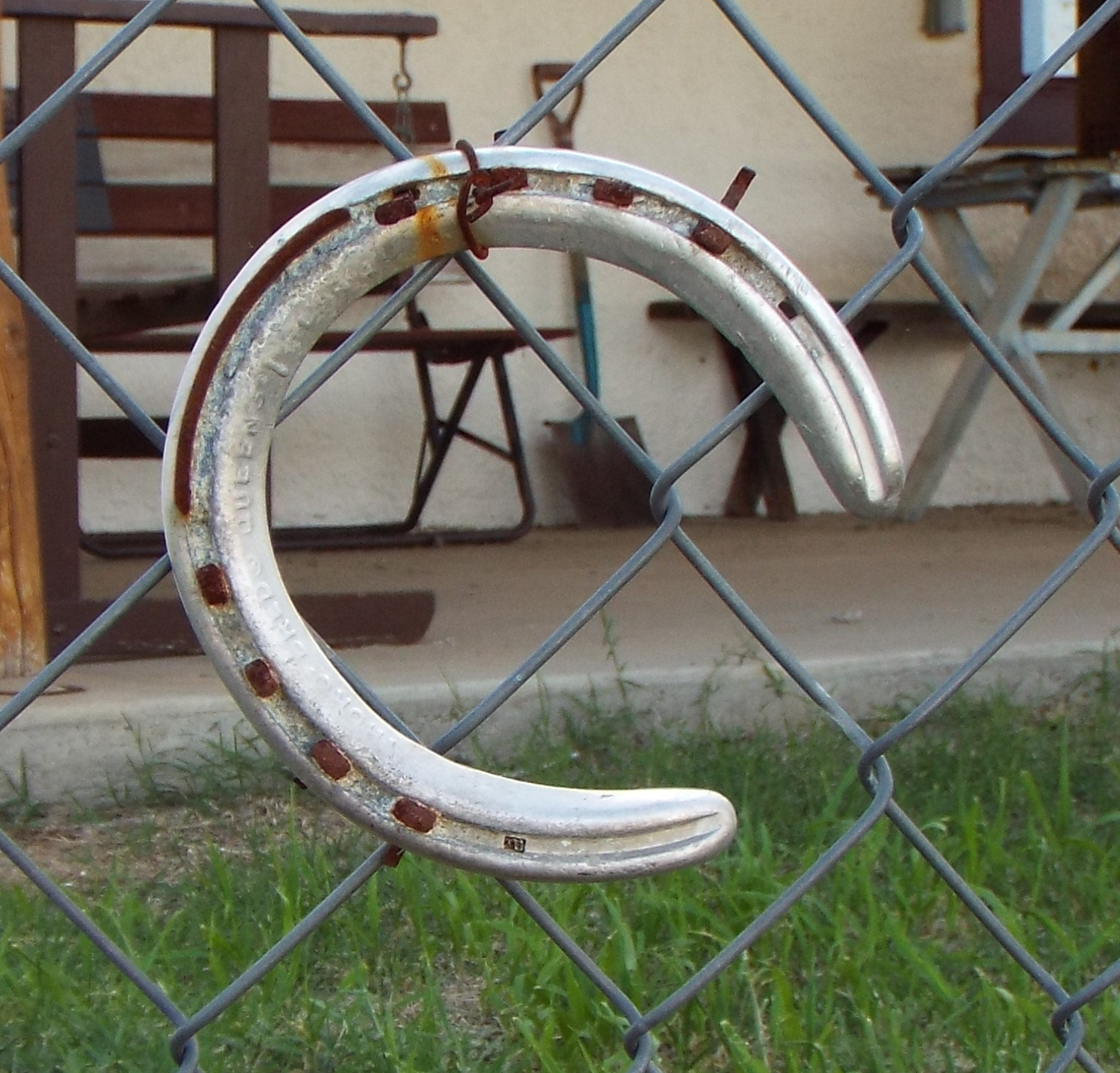
Horse shoe on the fence of the American Flag Post Office Ranch

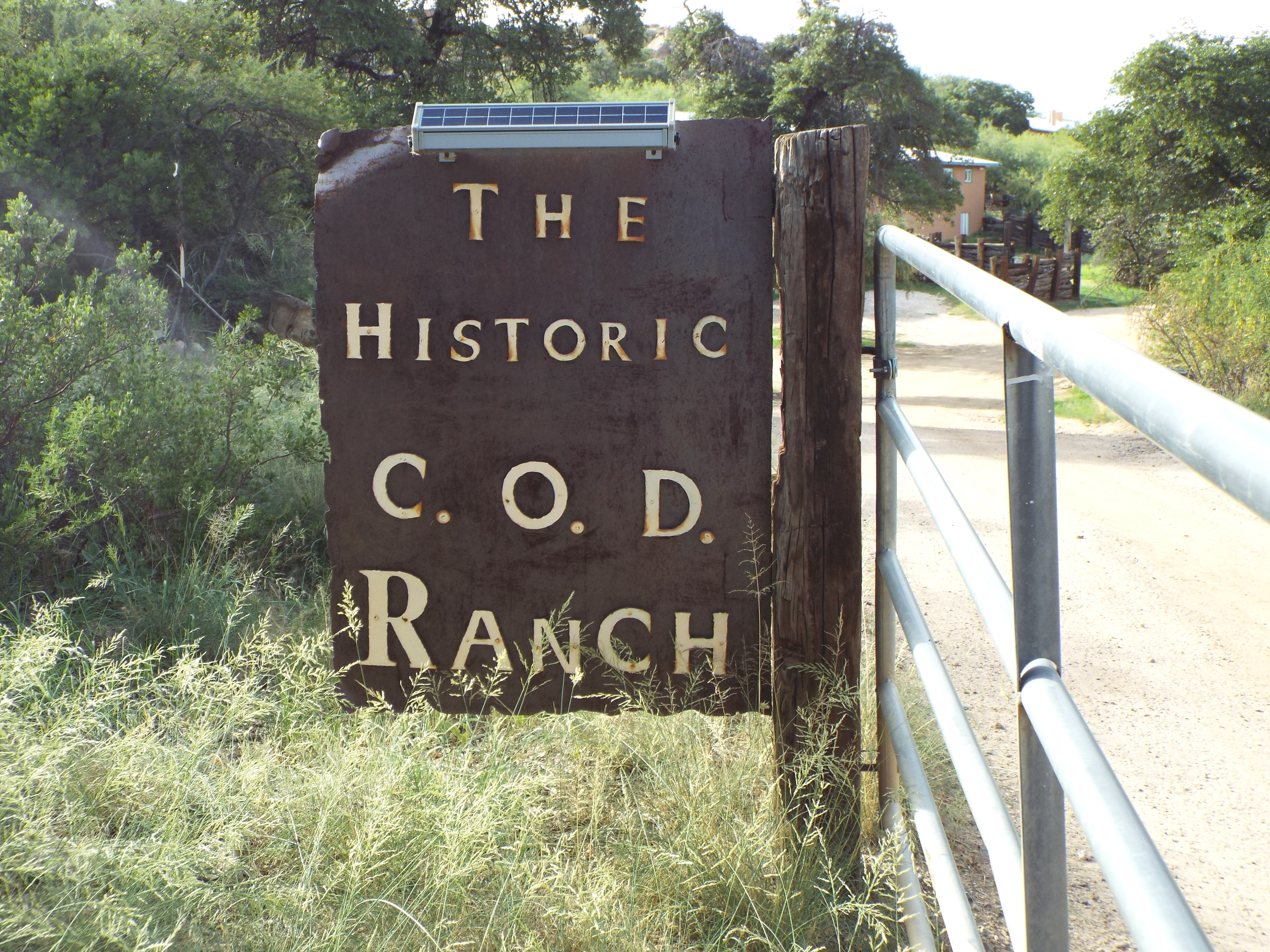
C.O.D. Ranch

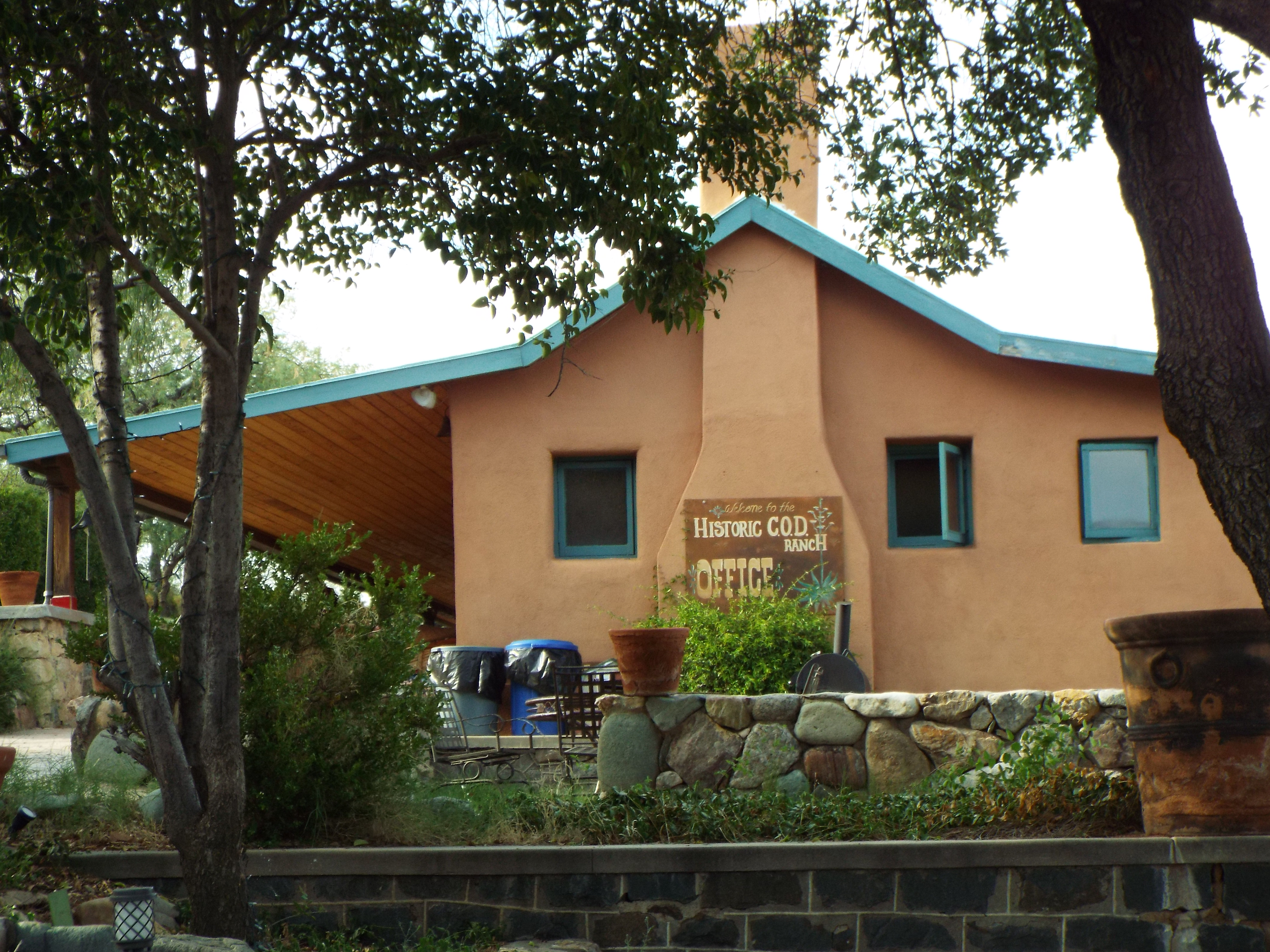
C.O.D. Ranch

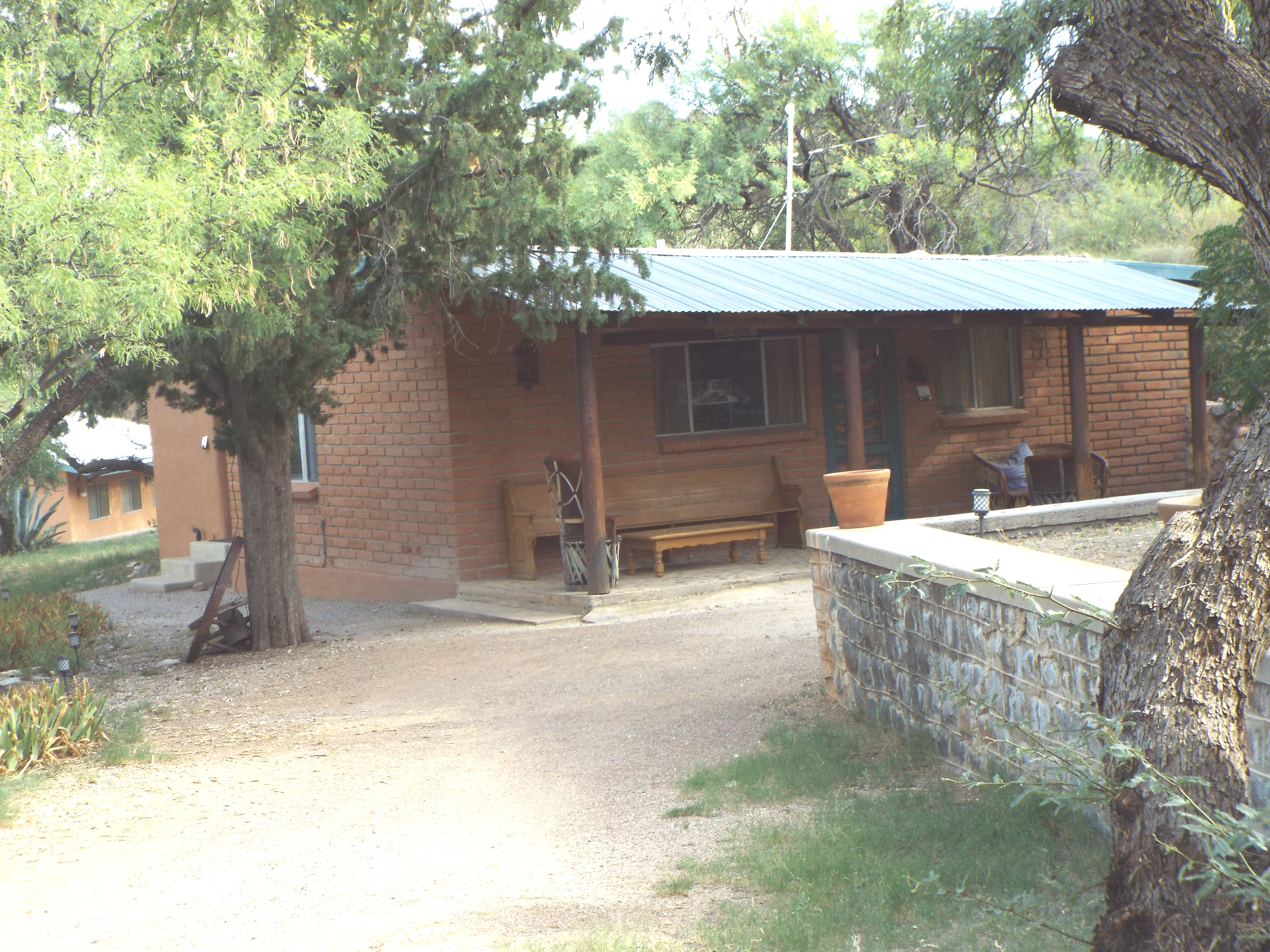
C.O.D. Ranch

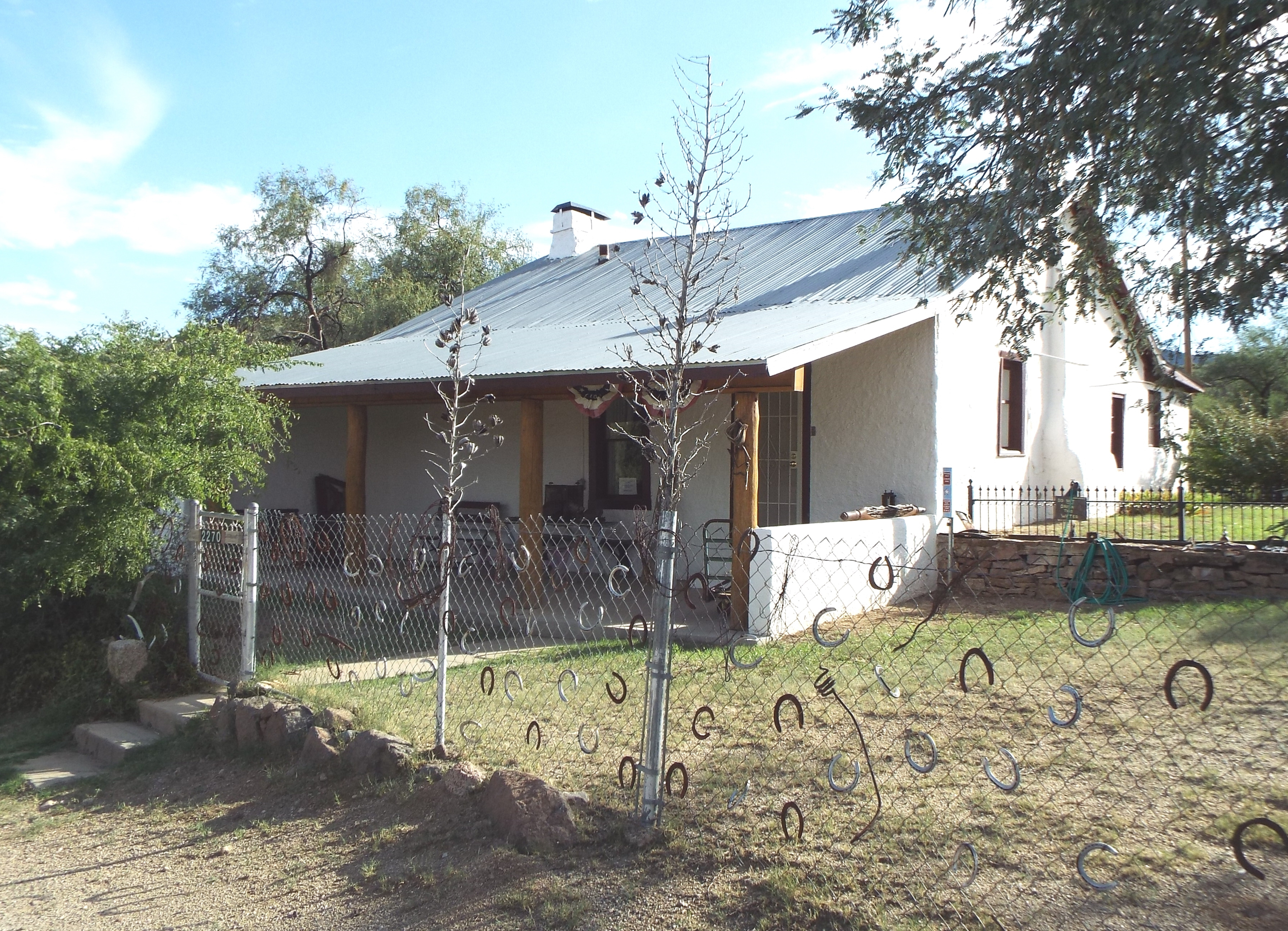
American Flag Post Office Ranch

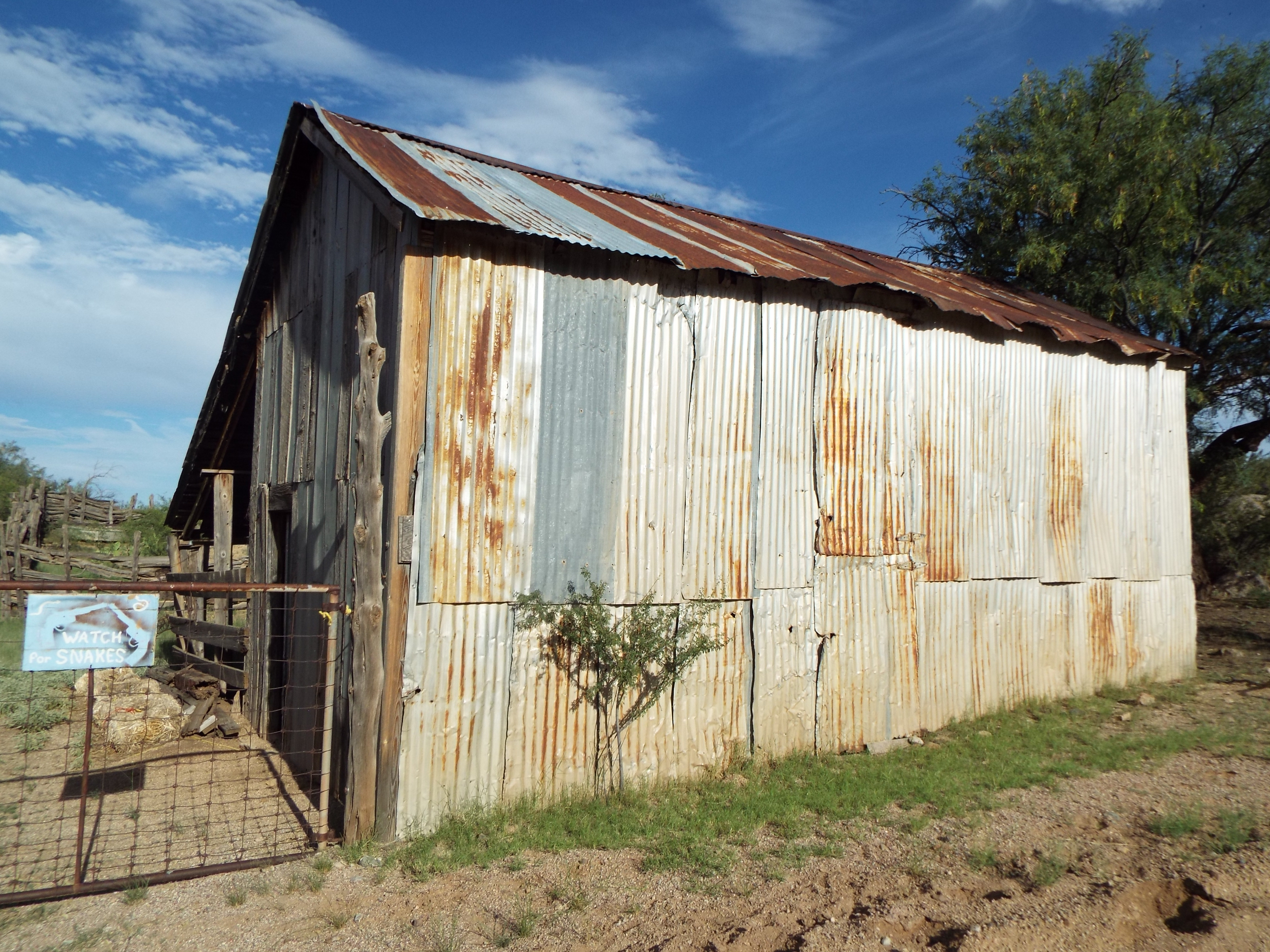
American Flag Post Office Ranch barn

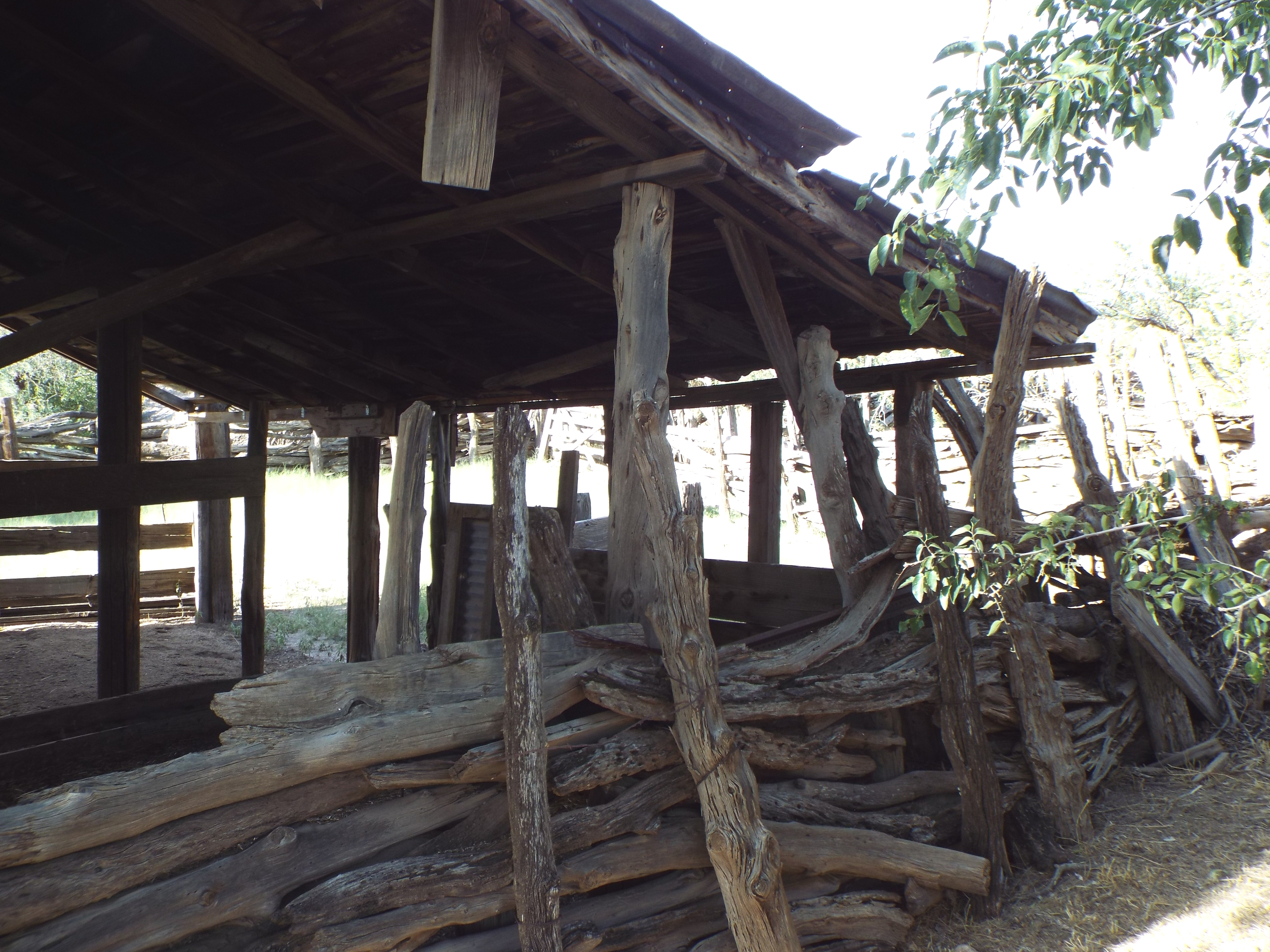
American Flag Post Office Ranch corral

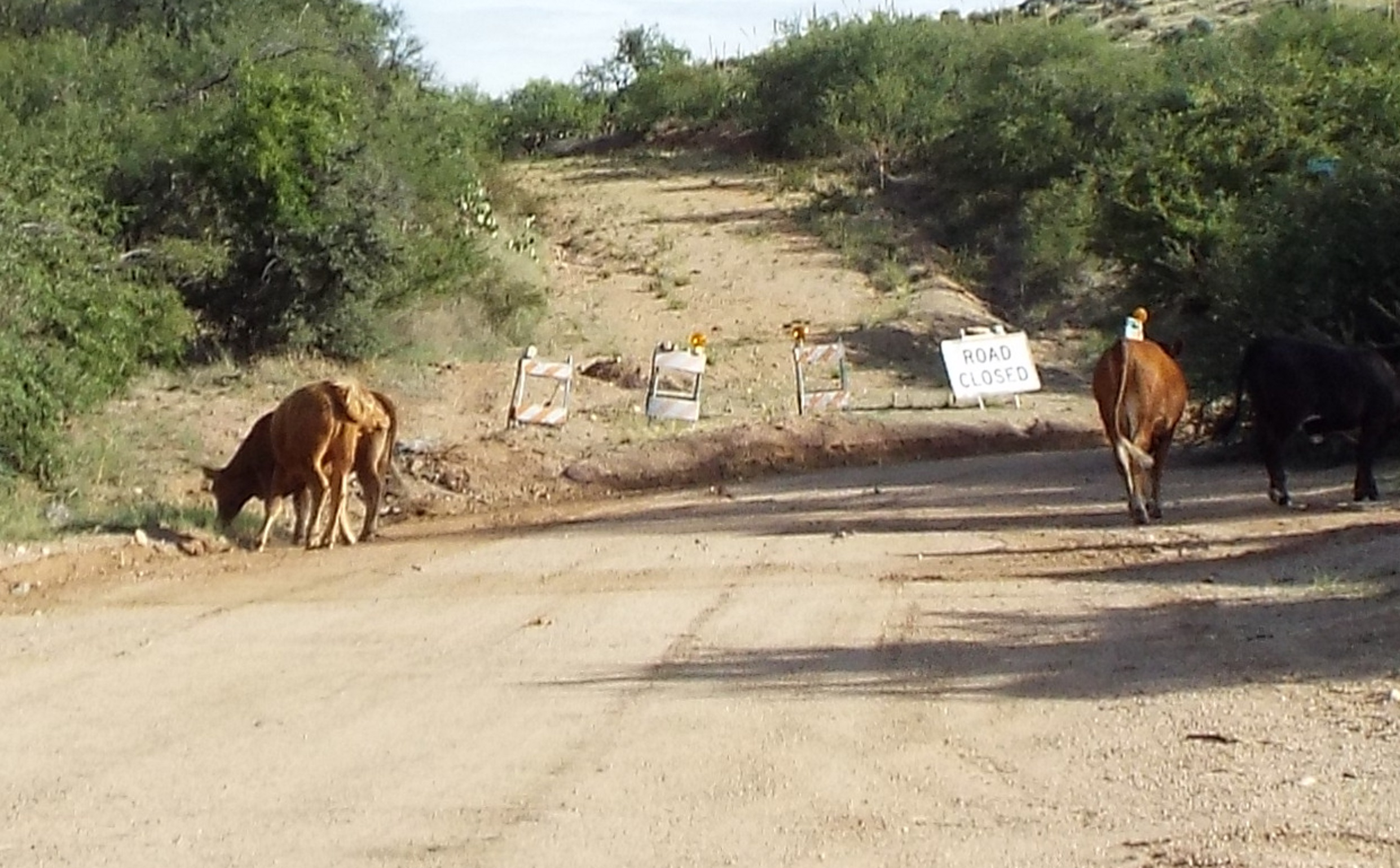
American Flag Post Office Ranch livestock

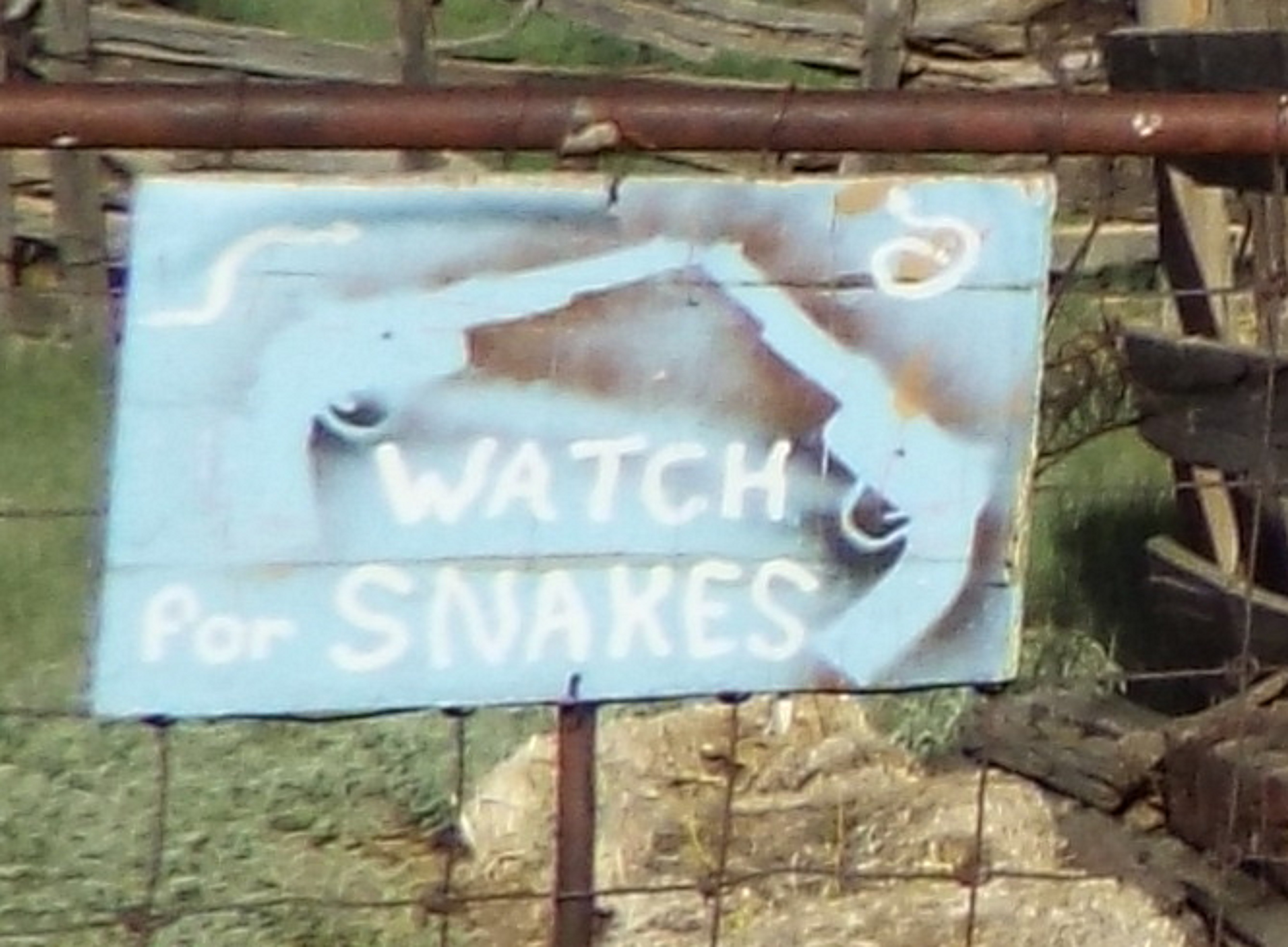
Watch for Snakes sign

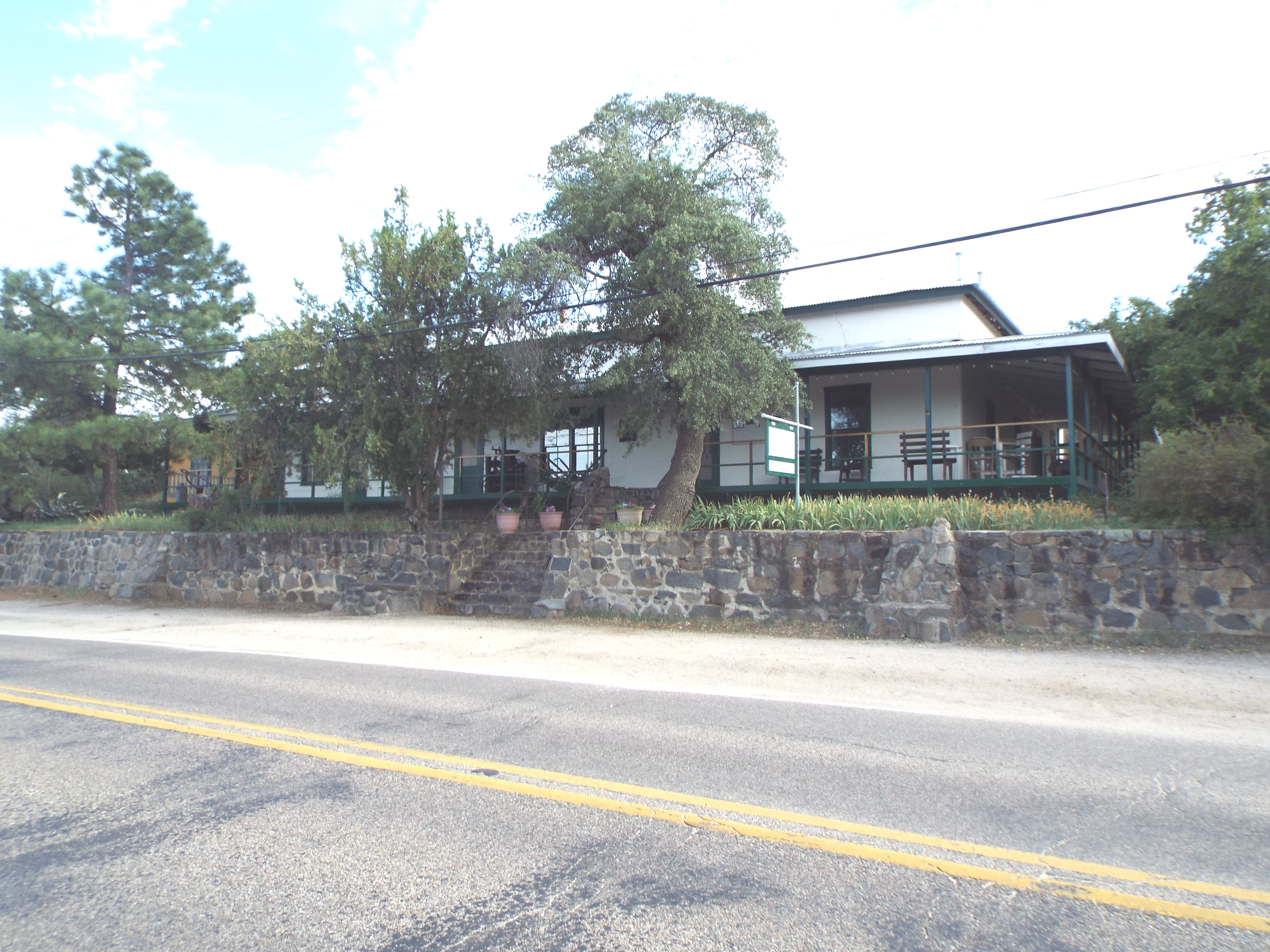
Acadia Ranch House

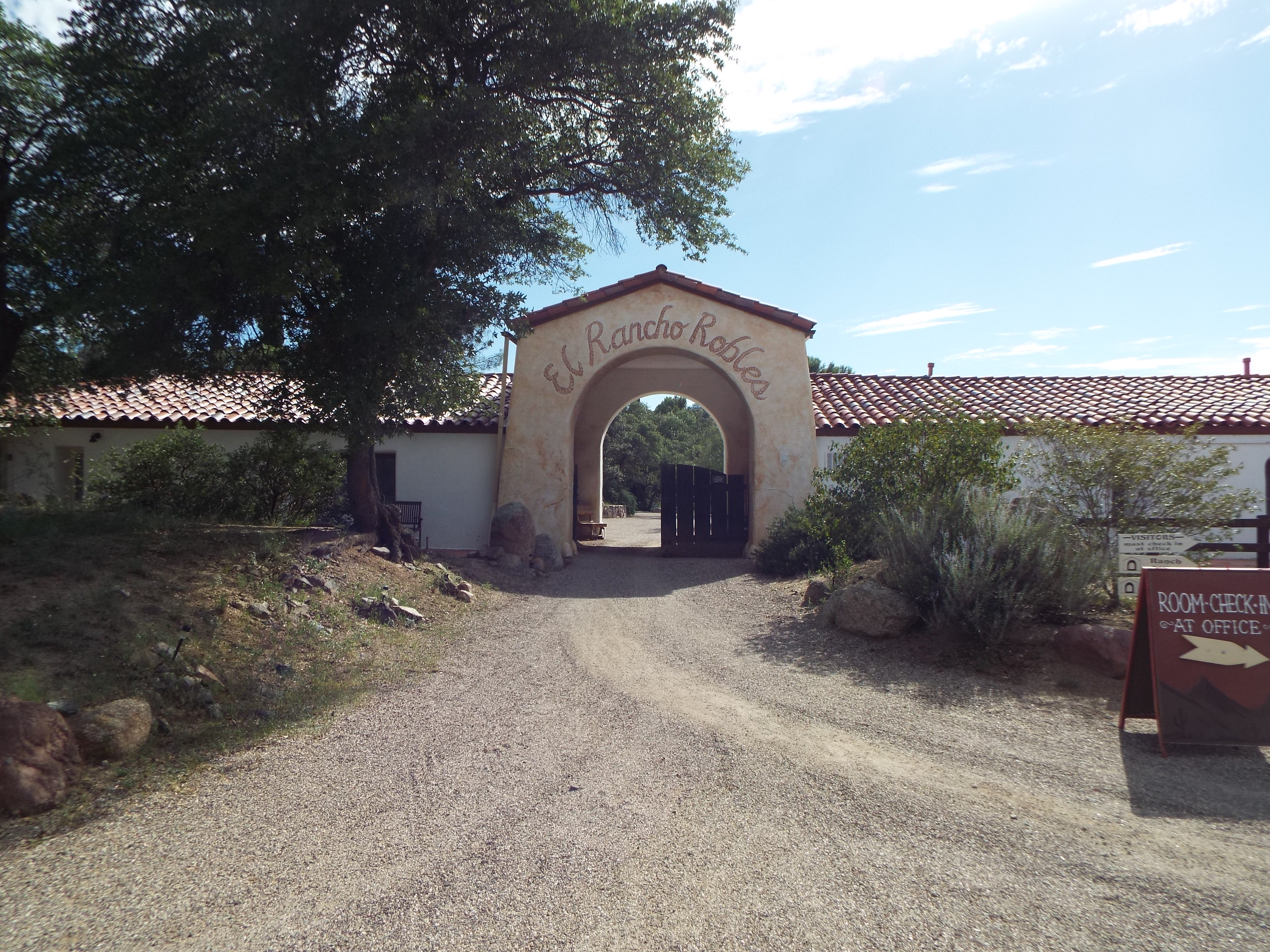
El Rancho Robles

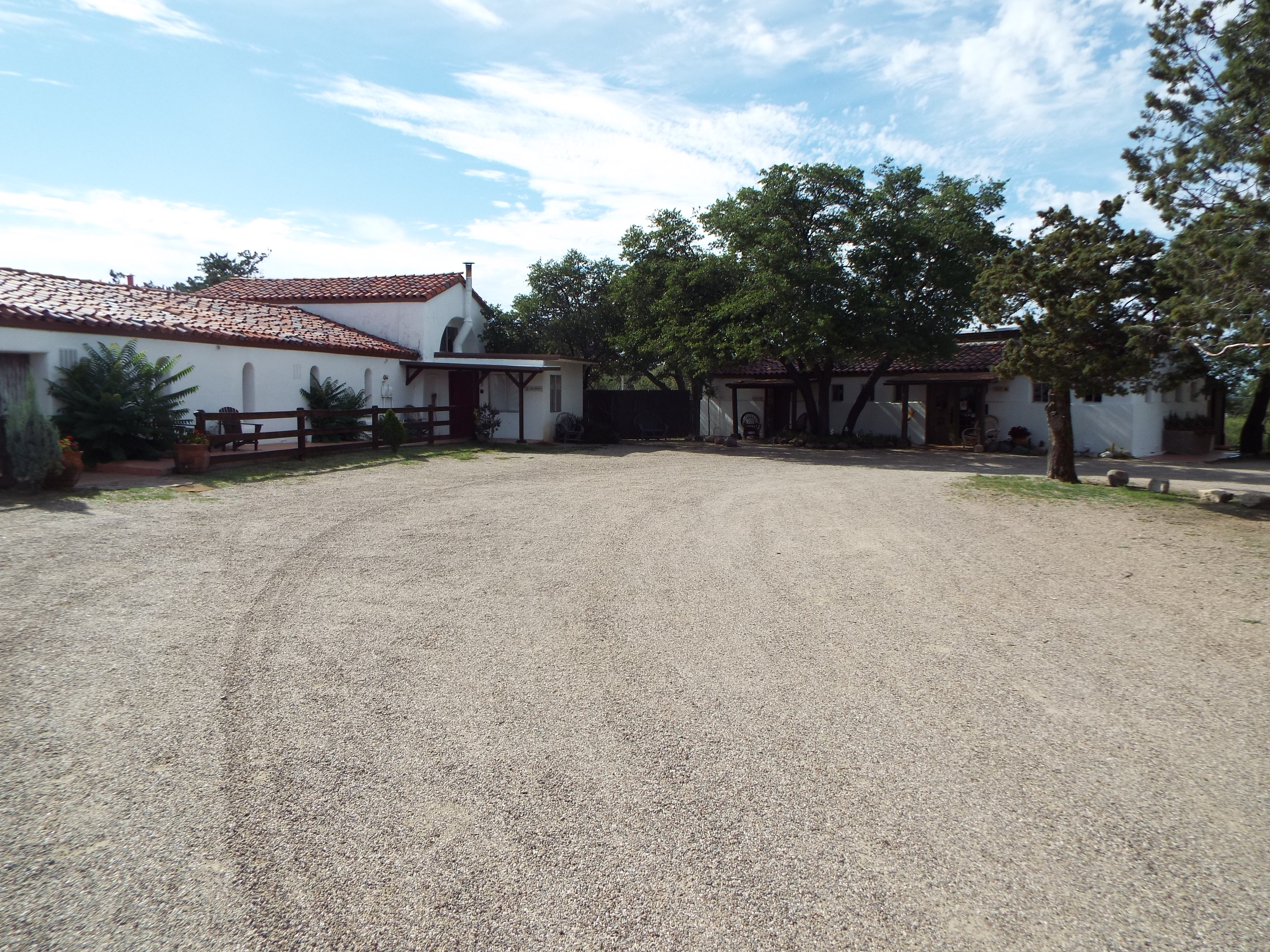
El Rancho Robles

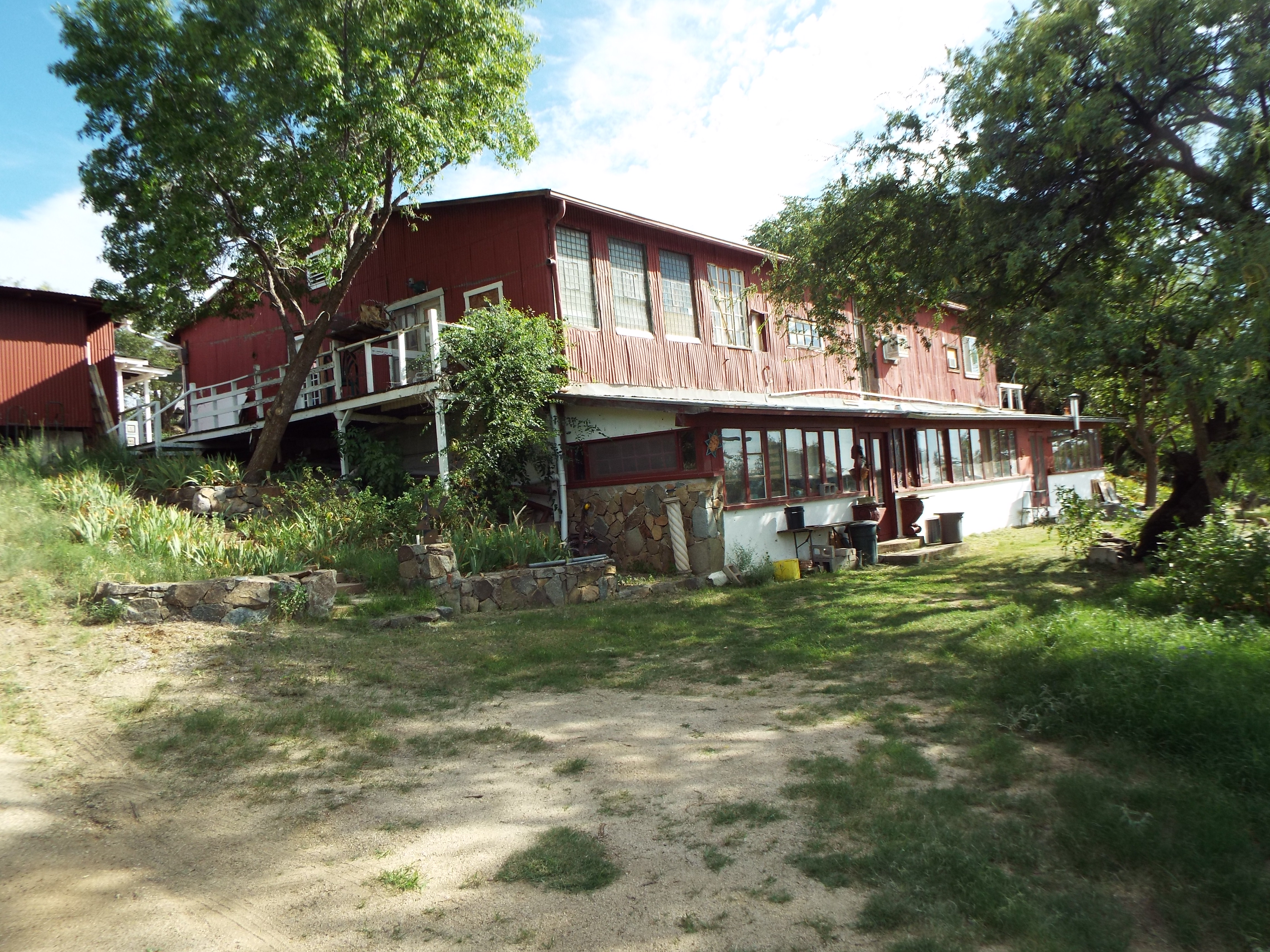
Rancho Linda Vista

== La Casa del High Jinks ==
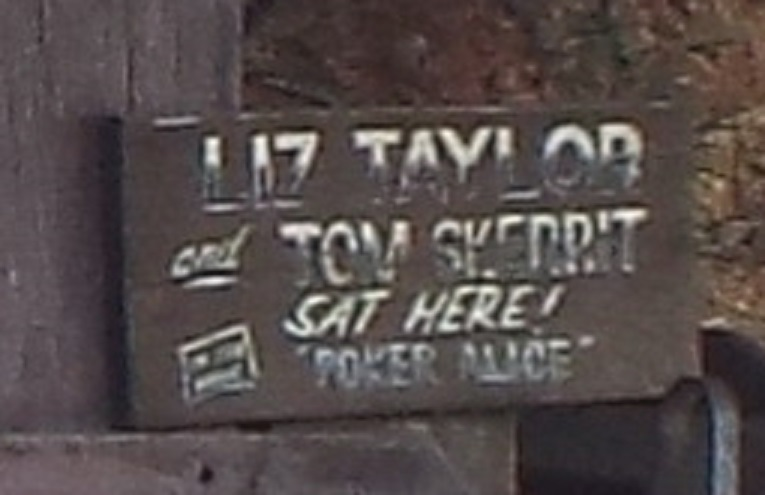
Sign on the Bain 9-A Buckboard

- La Casa del High Jinks – established in 1912 and located at 33550 South Highjinks Road 0.7 miles north of Campo Bonito Road. This was the ranch which belonged to Buffalo Bill Cody until his death in 1917. La Casa del High Jinks was the stage for the 1924 motion picture The Mine with the Iron Door. The 1895 Bain 9-A buckboard, which was used by Elizabeth Taylor and Tom Skerritt in the 1987 American made-for-television western romance film "Poker Alice", is exhibited in the ranch. A buckboard is a four-wheeled wagon of simple construction meant to be drawn by a horse or other large animal. It was listed in the National Register of Historic Places on October 16, 1996, reference: #96001056.
La Casa del High Jinks

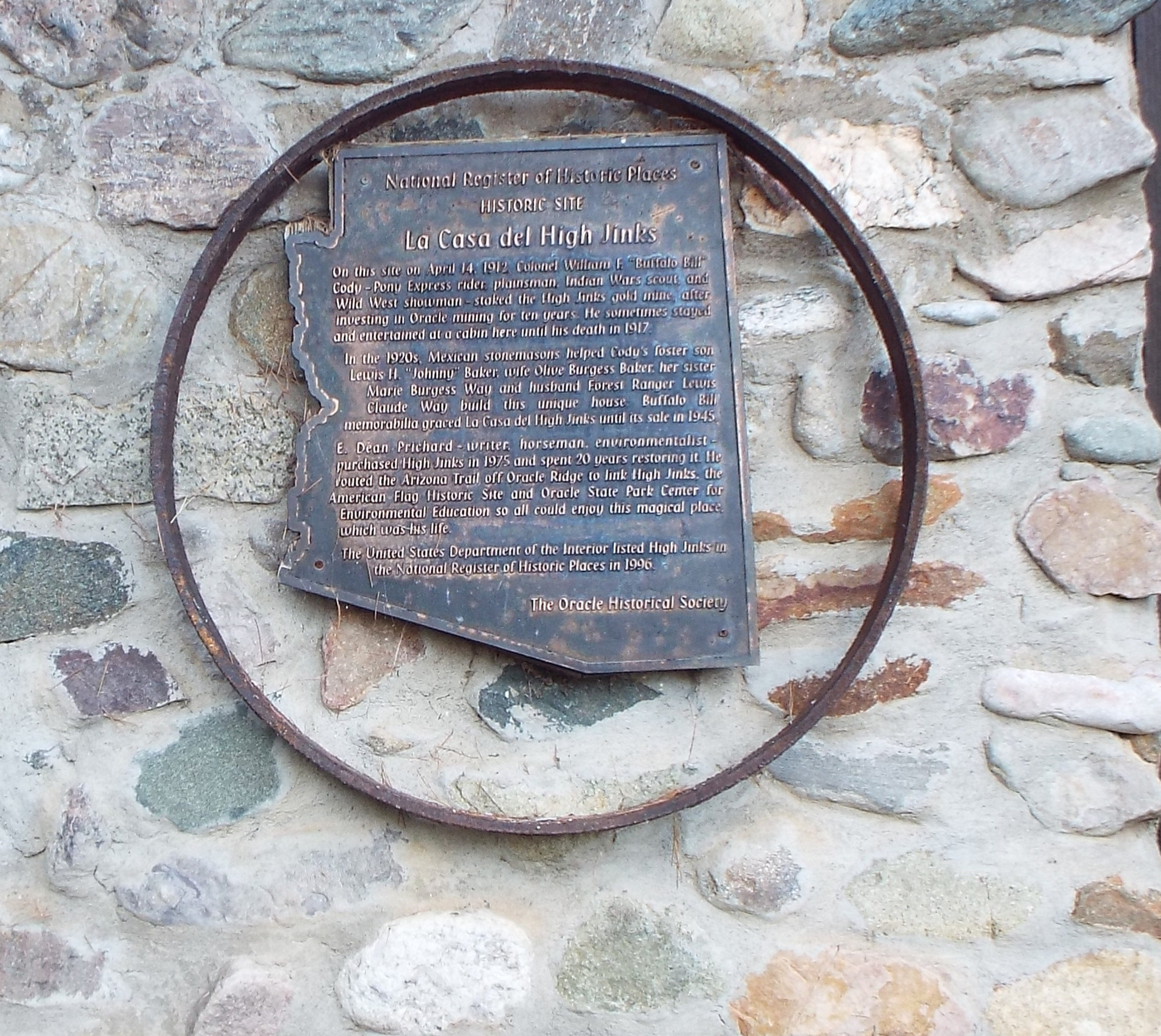
La Casa del High Jinks historic marker

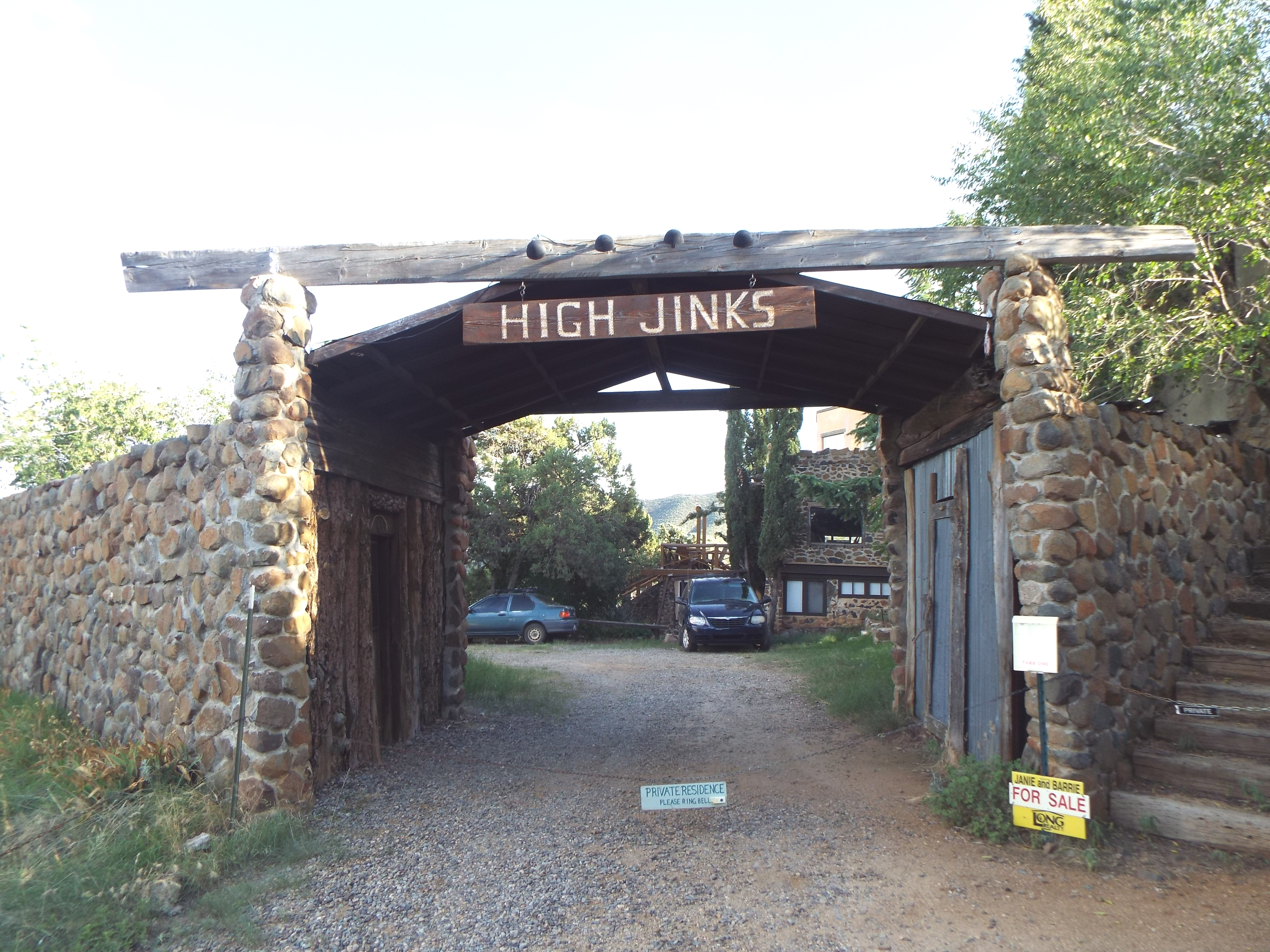
La Casa del High Jinks entrance

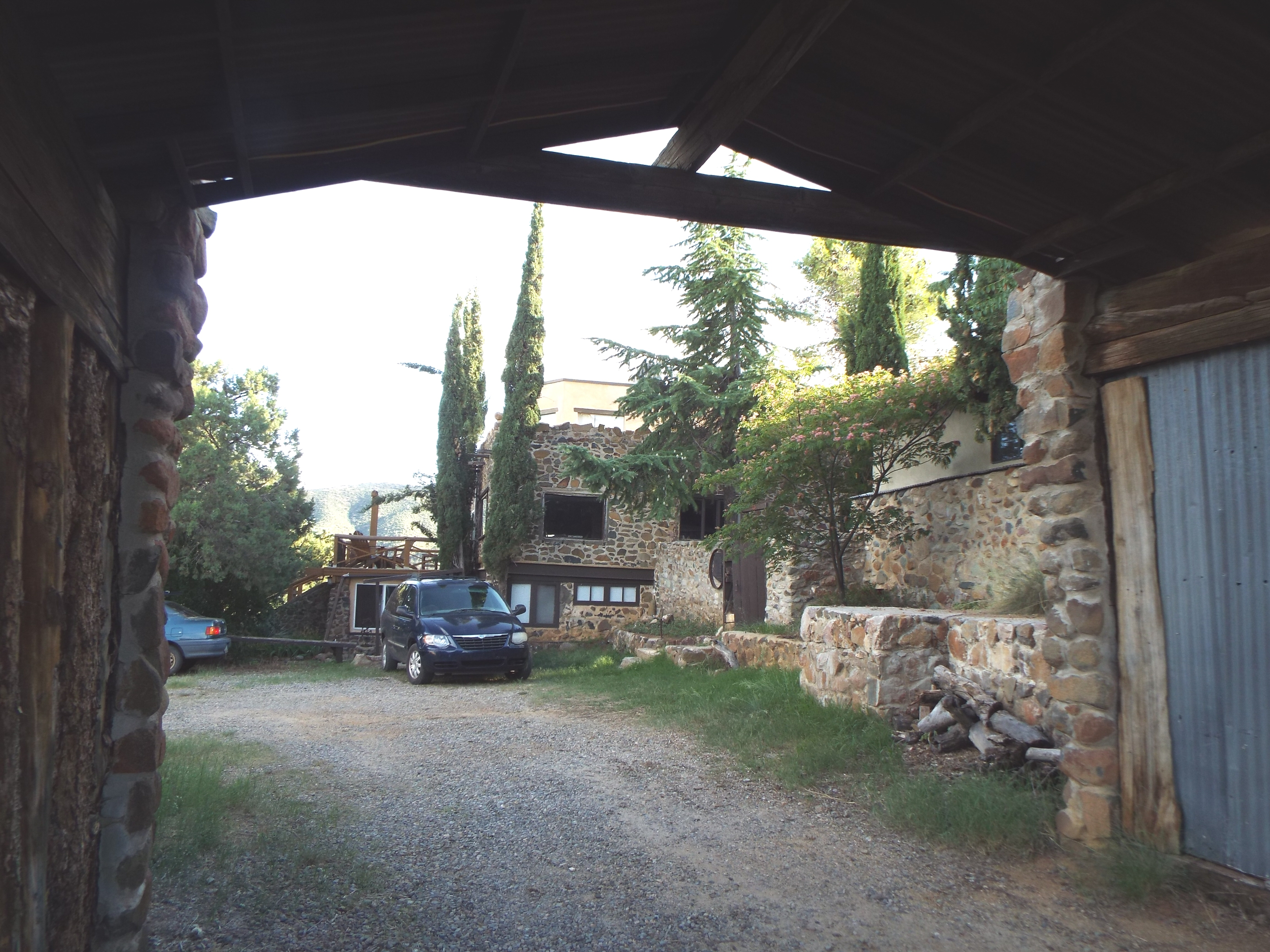
La Casa del High Jinks – 1912

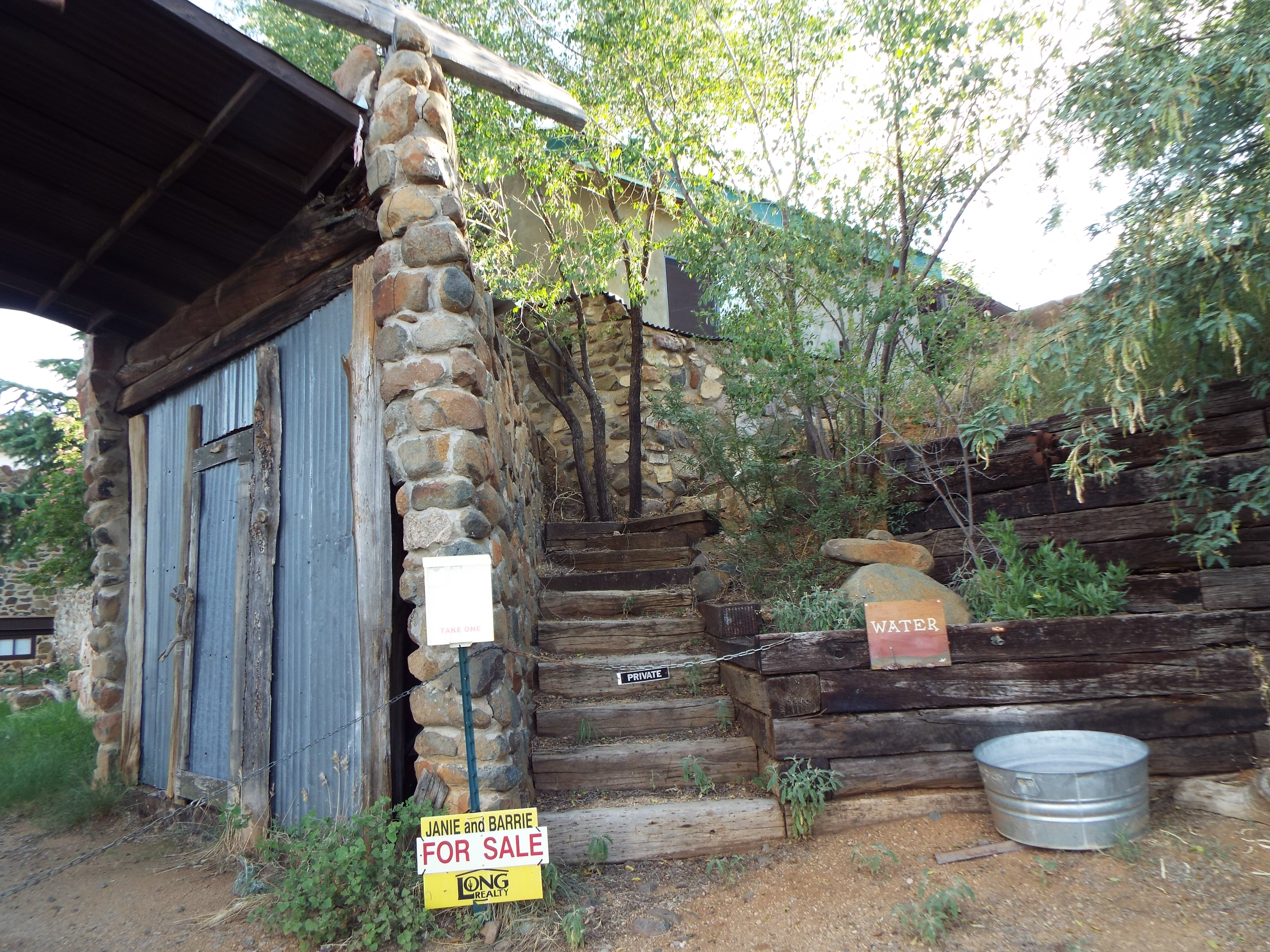
La Casa del High Jinks

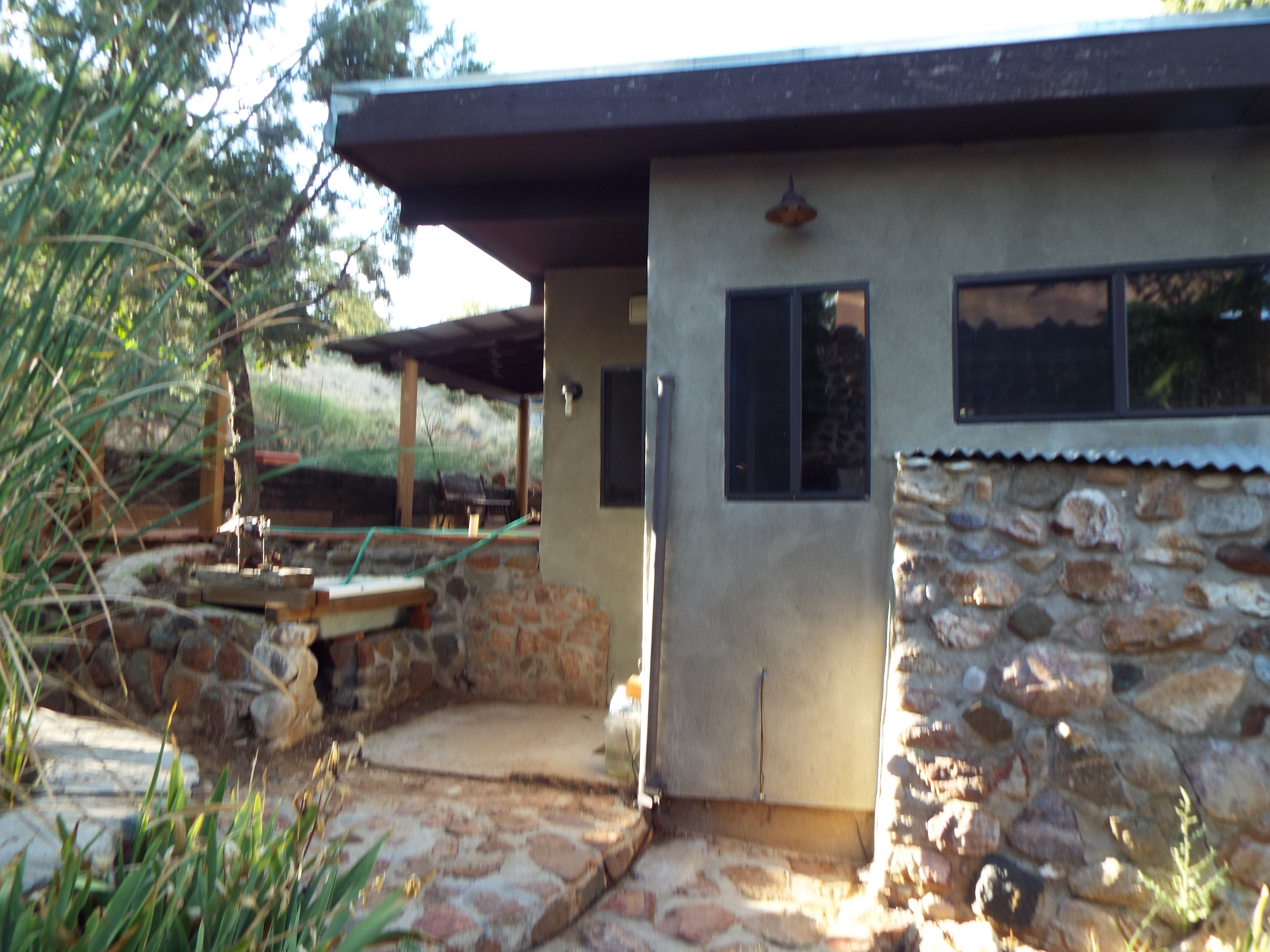
La Casa del High Jinks

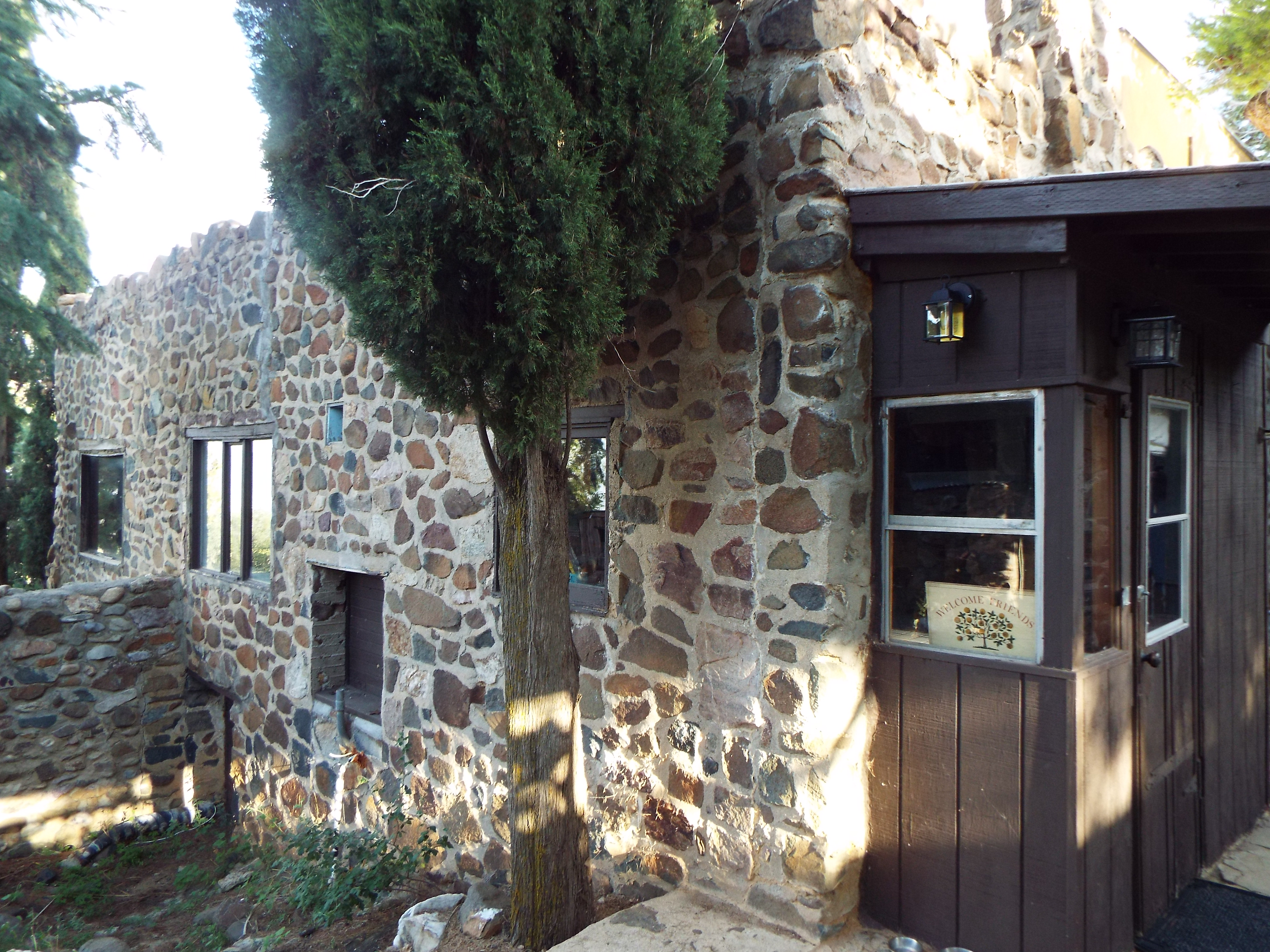
La Casa del High Jinks

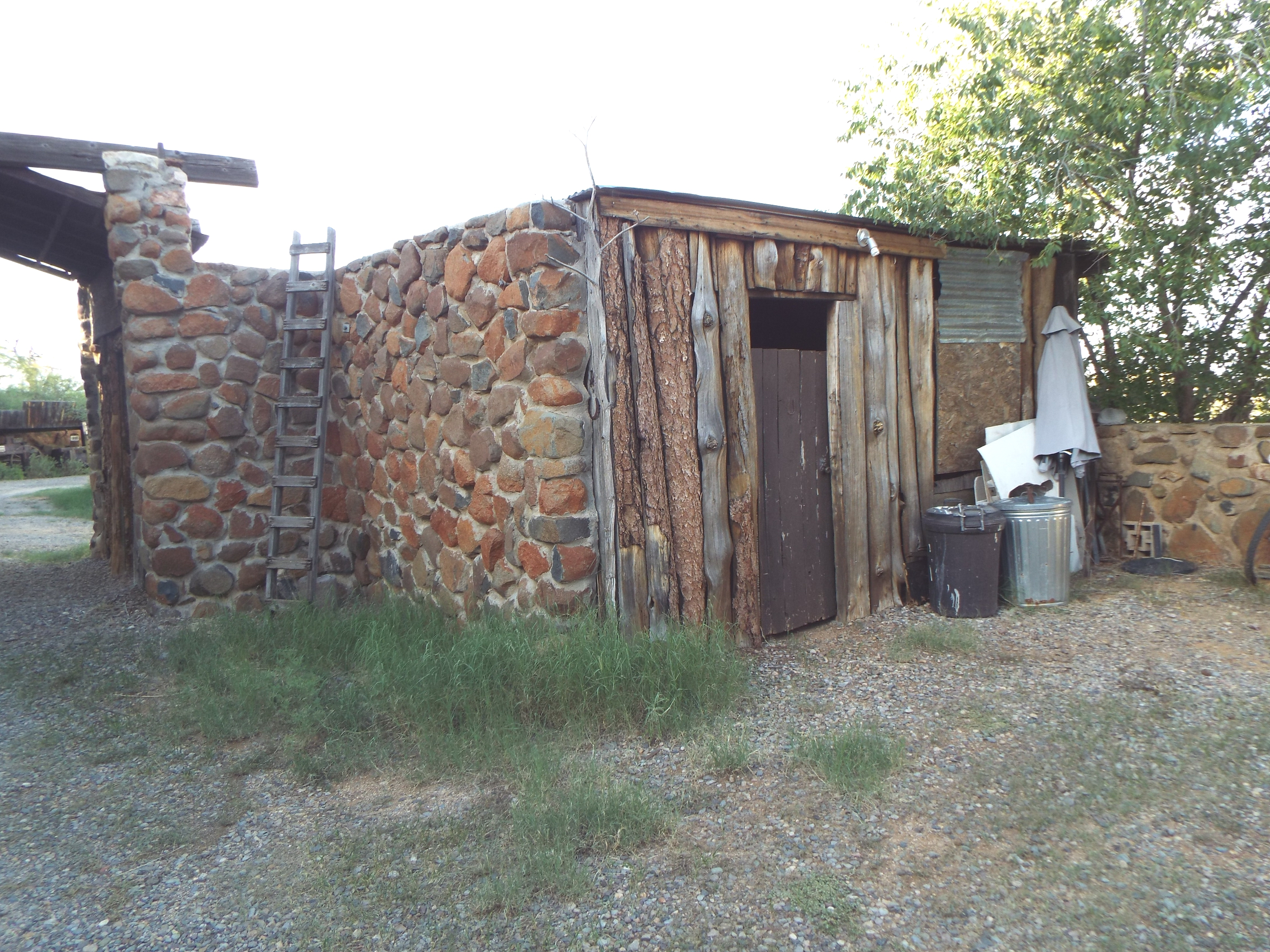
La Casa del High Jinks

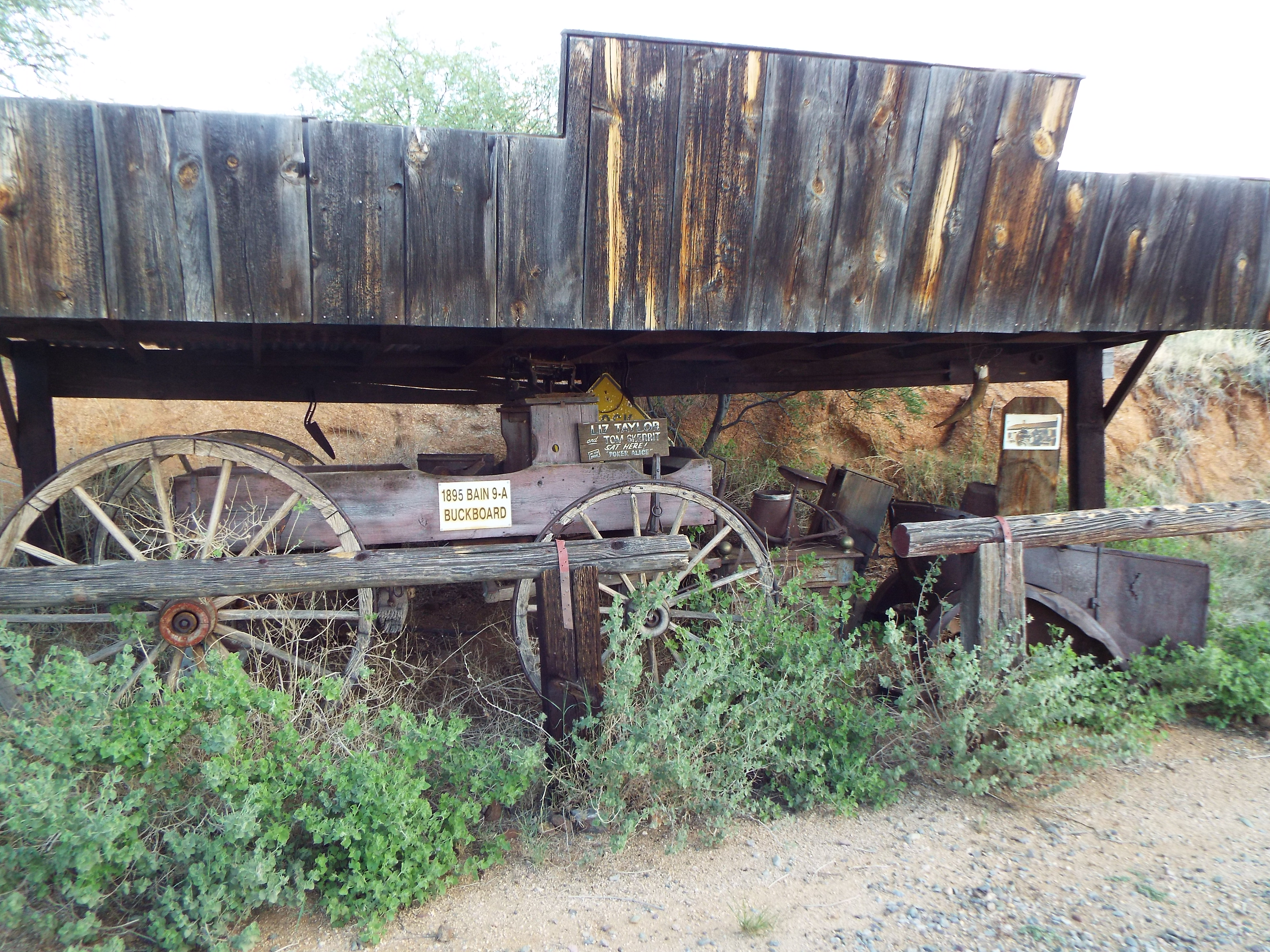
1895 Bain 9-A Buckboard

== Biosphere 2 ==
The Biosphere 2 is an Earth system science research facility. It was built between the years 1987 and 1991. Since 2011, it has been owned by the University of Arizona. The Biosphere 2 serves as a center for research, outreach, teaching, and lifelong learning about Earth, its living systems, and its place in the universe.

Biosphere 2

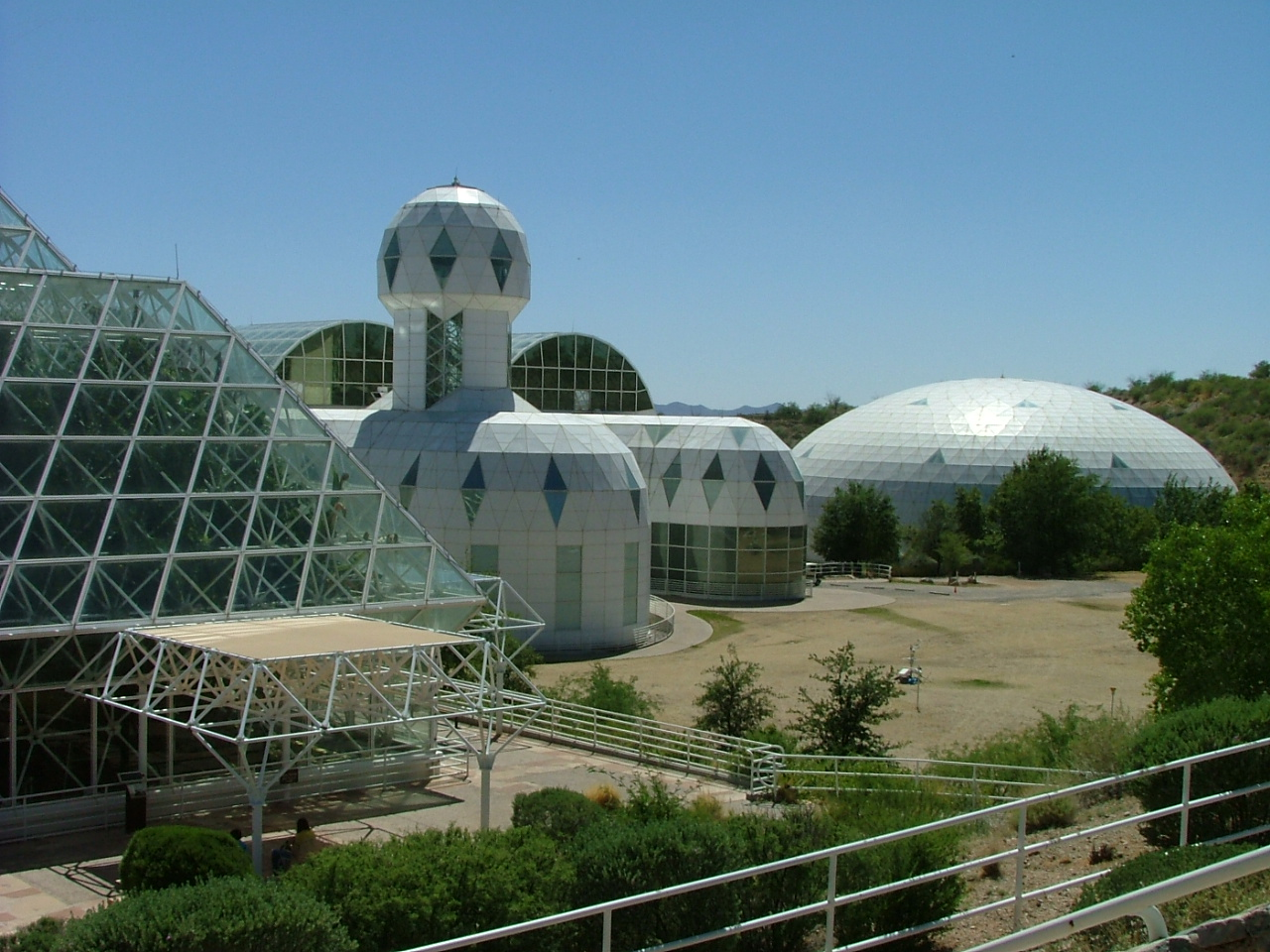
Exterior of Biosphere 2

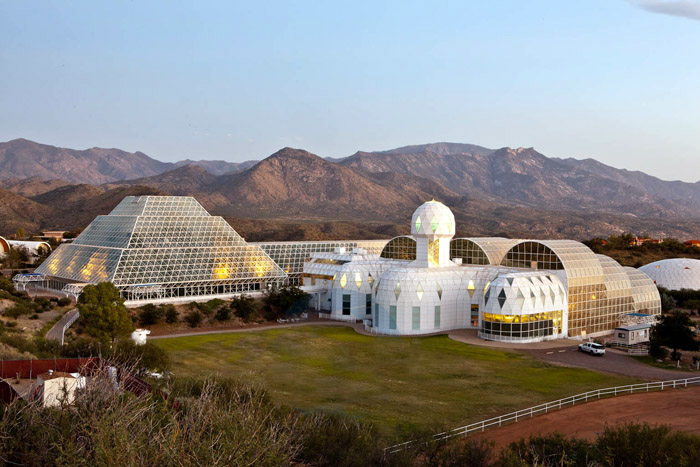
Biosphere 2 sits on the University of Arizona science campus that is open to the public.

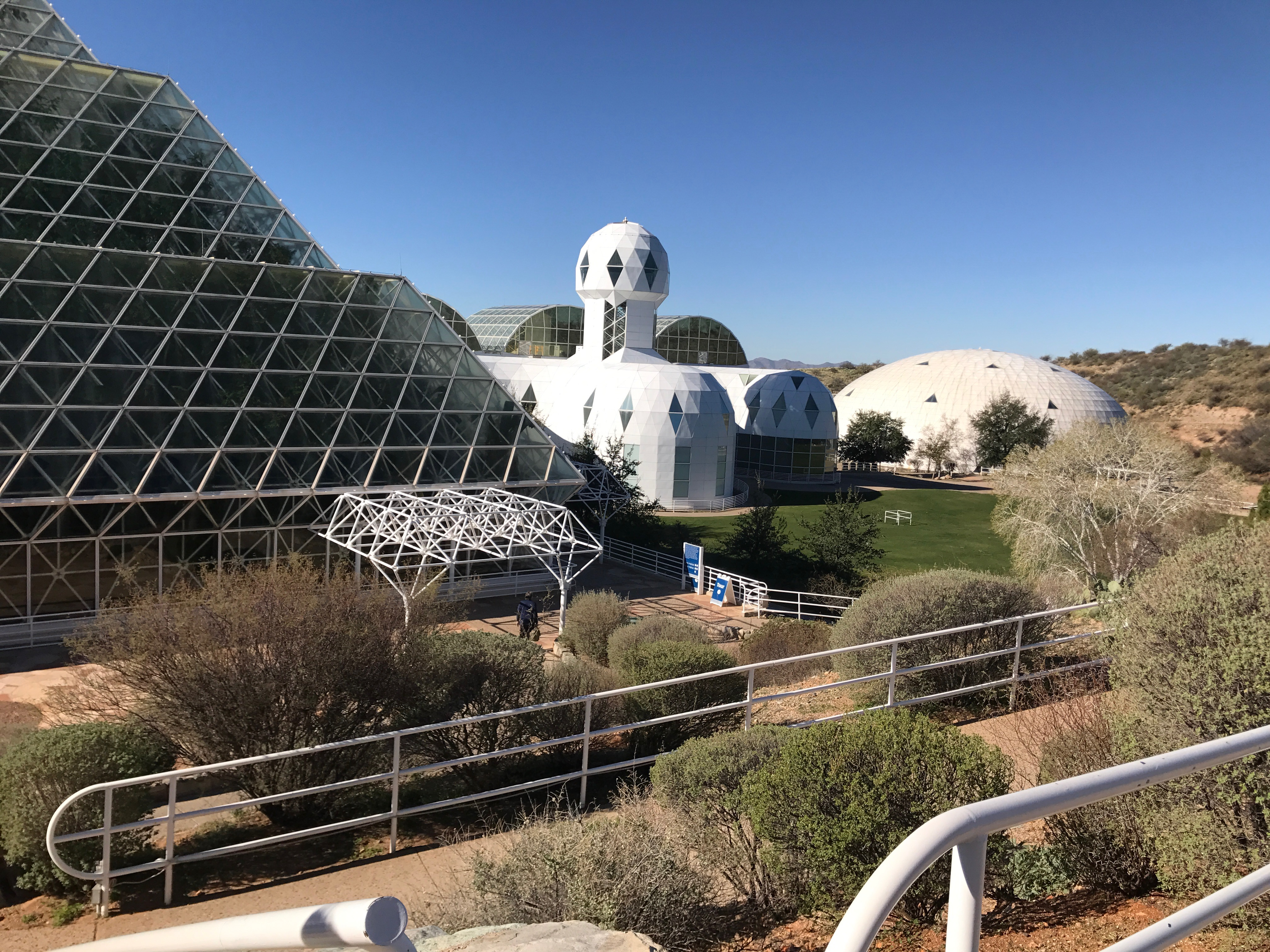
Exterior showing parts of the rainforest biome and of the habitat, with the West lung in the background

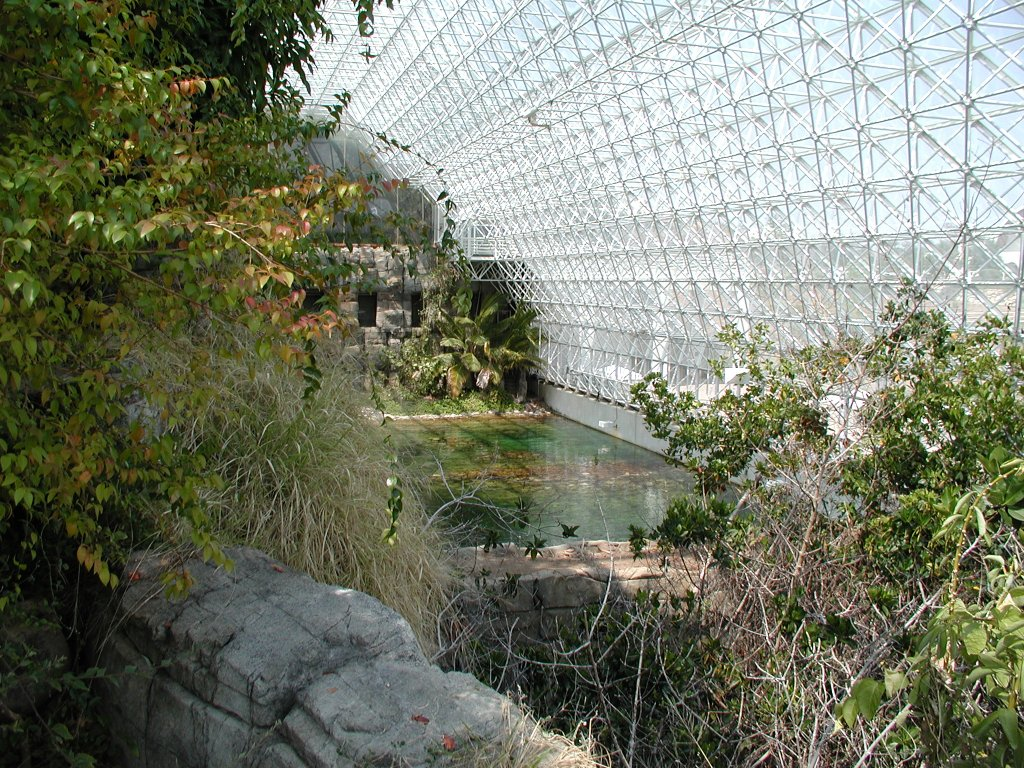
Biosphere 2, view from the thornscrub, a transition zone between Savannah and Desert (foreground) and Ocean (background) sections

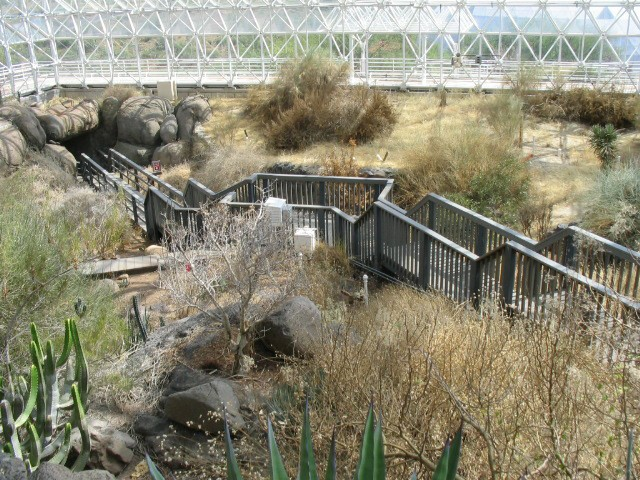
The fog desert section of the Biosphere

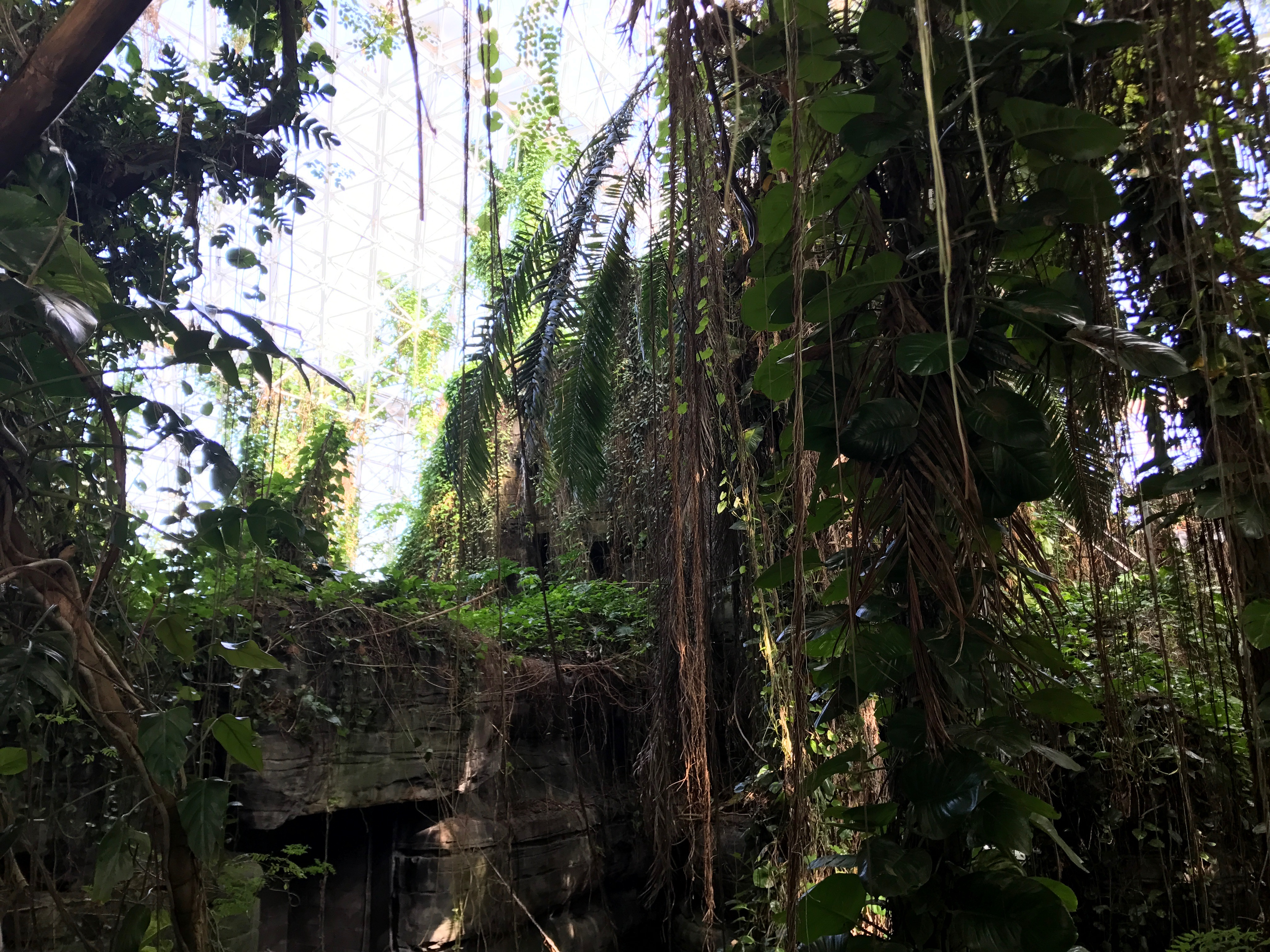
The tropical rainforest

== See also ==
- Oracle, Arizona
- National Register of Historic Places listings in Pinal County, Arizona
