= Poker Alice =

English poker and faro player (1851–1930)

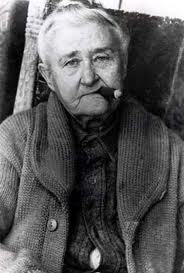
- Born: Alice Ivers; 17 February 1851; Devonshire, England
- Died: 27 February 1930 (aged 79); Rapid City, South Dakota, U.S.
- Resting place: St. Aloysius Cemetery, Sturgis, South Dakota, U.S.
- Occupations: Gambler; brothel owner; rancher
- Spouses: Frank Duffield; Warren G. Tubbs; George Huckert

Alice Ivers Duffield Tubbs Huckert (17 February 1851 – 27 February 1930), better known as Poker Alice, Poker Alice Ivers, or Poker Alice Tubbs, was an English-born American gambler, brothel owner, and rancher who became known for playing poker and faro in the Wild West.

Born in Devonshire to Irish parents, Ivers moved with her family to Virginia at the age of 12. As an adult, she moved to Leadville, Colorado, where she met her first husband Frank Duffield. He got her interested in poker, but was killed a few years after they married. She made a name for herself by winning money from poker games in places like Silver City, New Mexico, and worked at a saloon in Creede, Colorado, which was owned by Jesse James' killer Robert Ford.

== Early life ==
Alice Ivers was born in Devonshire on 17 February 1851, the daughter of Irish immigrants. Her family moved to Virginia when she was 12. As a young woman, she went to boarding school in Virginia to become a refined lady. In her late teens, her family moved to Leadville, Colorado.

== Personal life ==
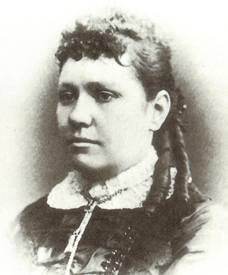
Poker Alice, early photo

It was in Leadville that Ivers met Frank Duffield, whom she married at a young age. Frank was a mining engineer who played poker in his spare time. After just a few years of marriage, Frank was killed in an accident while resetting a dynamite charge in a Leadville mine. Ivers was known for splurging her winnings, such as when she won a lot of money in Silver City, New Mexico, only to spend it all in New York City. After all of her big wins, she would travel to New York and spend her money on clothes. She was very keen on keeping up with the latest fashion and would buy dresses to wear at poker games, partly as a business investment to distract her opponents.

Ivers met her next husband Warren G. Tubbs around 1890, when they were both dealers at Bedrock Tom's saloon in Deadwood, South Dakota. A drunken miner tried to attack Warren with a knife, causing her to threaten the miner with her .38 firearm. After this incident, she started a romance with Warren and they were soon married. Some sources report they had had seven children together. Other sources report they did not have any children together, but that she brought a daughter and a son into the marriage, giving Warren two stepchildren. Her son, George, would take on the Tubbs name. In 1934, George was saved from a train after he was found lying on the tracks. Two women were able to pull him to safety just in time to save his life. At the time of the incident, he was 65 years old, putting his birth around 1868.

Warren was a painter by trade, and it was speculated that he contracted tuberculosis through his work. For the last years of his life, Ivers tried to help him regain his health. A few months before he died, she moved him to a ranch on the Moreau River, 100 miles (160 km) from Sturgis, South Dakota, where he died on 31 December 1909. To secure a proper burial and funeral, Ivers wrapped his body in blankets, placed him in their lumber wagon, and traveled to Sturgis with her team of horses. It took her four days to travel along the snow-covered trails to Sturgis, where she was able to arrange a funeral for Warren. In order to pay the funeral costs, she traveled to Rapid City, South Dakota, where she worked as a bartender at Black Nell's resort.

Her third husband was George Huckert, who worked on her homestead and took care of the sheep. He was constantly proposing to her, and she eventually came to owe him $1,008 but married him instead, figuring that it would be cheaper than paying his back wages. Huckert died on 12 October 1924.

== Poker career ==
After the death of her first husband, Ivers started to play poker seriously. She was in a tough financial position. After failing in a few different jobs including teaching, she turned to poker to support herself financially. She would make money by gambling and working as a dealer. She made a name for herself by winning money from poker games. By the time she was given the nickname "Poker Alice", she was drawing in large crowds to watch her play and men were constantly challenging her to play. Saloon owners liked that she was a respectable woman who kept to her values, including her refusal to play poker on Sundays.

As her reputation grew, so did the amount of money she won. Some nights she won $6,000 She claimed she had won $250,000, which would now be worth more than $3 million. She used her appearance to distract men at the poker table. She always had the newest dresses, and was considered attractive even in her 50s. She was skilled at counting cards and calculating odds, which helped her at the table.

Alice was known to have always carried a gun with her, preferably her .38, and frequently smoked cigars.

== Resort and jail time ==
After Warren's death, Ivers eventually purchased a building on the south side of Bear Butte Creek, between the city of Sturgis and Fort Meade, where the current Sturgis City Park now stands. Poker Alice's resort, as it was commonly known, gained notoriety in 1913 due to a confrontation between soldiers of Troop K stationed at Fort Meade and Ivers herself.

Trouble had initially developed between the soldiers and Ivers in the early part of July 1913, a little over a week before the shooting. Later that week, the trouble was rekindled, and finally once again on 14 July. Around 10:30 pm, five soldiers of Troop K, accompanied by a number of members of the South Dakota guard that had recently been stationed at Fort Meade, went to Ivers' resort for the intention of starting a "rough house". After the soldiers were refused admittance, they began throwing stones through the windows of Ivers' resort and cutting telephone and electric wires. In response, Ivers opened fire, landing five shots. One struck Private Fred Koetzle of Troop K in the head, and he died from the wound at around midnight. Another soldier, 22-year-old Joseph C. Miner, was also shot, the bullet passing three inches above his heart. While he was initially expected to also die from his wounds, he later recovered. Three other individuals were also struck, including a civilian.

Immediately following the shooting, police, the sheriff and his deputies arrived at the scene. Ivers, along with six of her girls, were placed under arrest and sent to the county jail. No charges were filed by State's Attorney Gray of Meade County against Ivers for the shooting and subsequent death of Koetzle. After investigating the facts of that night, it was determined that Ivers was justified in the shooting, as she was defending or attempting to defend her personal property. However, she was charged with keeping a house of "ill fame" and her six girls (Jennie Palmer, Bessie Brundidge, Ann Carr, Birdie Harris, Mabel Smith, and Edith Brown) were convicted of frequenting a house of "ill fame".

Two years later, another confrontation at Poker Alice's resort led to the shooting of several soldiers and one civilian. Private Cadwell was shot in the abdominal region, Private Wood in the neck, and an unnamed civilian in the arm. The incident was written off as a "booze" fight. Ivers continued to have run-ins with the law, culminating in the 1920s. In 1924, her resort was raided for bootlegging. The following year, her resort was raided, possibly for the last time, and she was charged and convicted of operating a house of prostitution.

In 1928, facing time in the state penitentiary for her convictions of bootlegging and running a house of prostitution, Ivers' community came together to petition the governor to grant her a pardon. The claim made was that Ivers was in poor health, and confinement to prison could be fatal for her. Hundreds signed the petition. On 20 December 1928, the pardon was granted by Governor William J. Bulow. After being pardoned, Ivers appears to have retired and no future run-ins with the law would be reported.

== Death ==
On 6 February 1930, Ivers underwent a gallbladder operation in Rapid City, South Dakota. There was a general fear that recovery would be difficult due to her advanced age, but it appeared just two days later that she was recovering speedily and she was expected to be able to return home before long. Her recovery continued, but doctors warned that there was no surety she was out of danger. She died on 27 February.

Funeral services were held for Ivers on 1 March 1930 at the St. Aloysius Cemetery in Sturgis, South Dakota, where she was buried. Father Columban of the Catholic Church gave a sermon at her grave. When her will was read, it was revealed that she had disinherited her relatives for ignoring her in her declining years, and had instead divided her estate among her friends.

== Legacy ==
- In 1960, Barbara Stuart played Poker Alice in a three-part episode of The Texan.
- Ivers has been fictionalized in several films, including the television films The New Maverick (in which she was played by Susan Sullivan) and Poker Alice (in which she was played by Elizabeth Taylor).
- Ivers is mentioned as one of the legends of the Wild West on the Lucky Luke album Calamity Jane.
- Poker Alice was the name used by an English indie rock band from Stratford-upon-Avon in the 1990s.
