= Poker Alice (film) =

1987 American television film

- Genre: Romance; Western
- Written by: James Lee Barrett
- Directed by: Arthur Allan Seidelman
- Starring: Elizabeth Taylor; Tom Skerritt; George Hamilton; Richard Mulligan
- Music by: Billy Goldenberg
- Country of origin: United States
- Original language: English

Production
- Executive producer: Harvey Matofsky
- Producer: Renée Valente
- Cinematography: Hanania Baer
- Editor: Millie Moore
- Running time: 92 minutes
- Production companies: Harvey Matofsky Entertainment; New World Television

Original release
- Network: CBS
- Release: May 22, 1987

Poker Alice is a 1987 American romantic Western television film directed by Arthur Allan Seidelman, written by James Lee Barrett, and starring Elizabeth Taylor, Tom Skerritt and George Hamilton. The film was shot on location in Old Tucson, Arizona.

== Plot ==
Alice Moffit, a professional gambler, goes to 1880s Arizona to attempt to beat anyone she can find at her favorite game, poker; that is why she is called "Poker Alice". Along the way, she wins a brothel in a poker game and finds the allure of sex and money tempting. Interested in remaining a gambler, she must find a way to leave the sex trade and decide whether she will choose as her fiancé her cousin John or the local sheriff.

== Cast ==
- Elizabeth Taylor as Alice Moffit
- Tom Skerritt as Jeremy Collins
- George Hamilton as Cousin John Moffit
- Richard Mulligan as Sears
- David Wayne as Amos
- Susan Tyrrell as Mad Mary
- Pat Corley as McCarthy
- Paul Drake as Baker
- Annabella Price as Miss Tuttwiler
- Mews Small as Baby Doe
- Gary Bisig as Gilmore
- Liz Torres as Big Erma
- Gary Grubbs as Marshal
- John Bennett Perry as Frank Hartwell

== Production ==
The film is loosely based on the life of Poker Alice Ivers but is fictionalized to the point that even the character's last name was changed for the movie.
