= Denman (surname) =

Denman is a surname. Notable people with the surname include:

== A ==
- Alex Denman (1901–1958), Canadian football player
- Anthony Denman (born 1979), American football player

== B ==
- Brian Denman (born 1956), American baseball player

== C ==
- Charles Denman, 5th Baron Denman (1916–2012), British businessman
- Chris Denman (born 1983), American football player

== D ==
- David Denman (born 1973), American film and television actor

== E ==
- Earl Denman, Canadian mountaineer who tried to climb Mount Everest in 1947

== F ==
- Frederick Denman (1929–2022), American modern pentathlete

== G ==
- George Denman (1819–1896), English rower, barrister, politician and judge
- George Denman (American football) (1874–1952), American teacher and football, basketball, and baseball coach
- Gertrude Denman, Baroness Denman (1884–1954), British women's rights activist

== H ==
- Harry Denman (1893–1976), American evangelist
- Helen Denman (born 1976), Australian swimmer
- Herbert Denman (1855–1903), American figure-painter

== J ==
- J. J. Denman (born c.1994), American football player
- Jeffry Denman, contemporary American actor, director, choreographer and author
- John Leopold Denman (1882–1975), English architect
- Joseph Denman (1810–1874), British naval officer notable for his actions against the slave trade

== K ==
- Kay Denman (born 1937), Australian politician

== M ==
- Mathias Denman (1760–1838), one of the founders of Cincinnati, Ohio

== R ==
- Sir Richard Denman, 1st Baronet (1876–1957), British politician

== S ==
- Stuart Denman (ice hockey) (born 1974), Australian ice hockey player

== T ==
- Thomas Denman (physician) (1733–1815), English expert in midwifery
- Thomas Denman, 1st Baron Denman (1779–1854), British lawyer, judge and politician
- Thomas Denman, 3rd Baron Denman (1874–1954), British politician, Governor-General of Australia
- Tony Denman (born 1979), American actor
- Trevor Denman (born 1952), South African American sportscaster and public-address announcer

== U ==
- Ulysses G. Denman (1866–1962), American politician

== W ==
- William Denman (judge) (1872–1959), Judge of the United States Court of Appeals for the Ninth Circuit
- William Denman (publisher) (1784–1870), New York newspaperman

== See also ==
- Denman (disambiguation)
