= Thomas Denman =

Thomas Denman may refer to:

- Thomas Denman (sculptor) (1787–1861) English sculptor
- Thomas Denman (physician) (1733–1815), English physician
- Thomas Denman, 1st Baron Denman (1779–1854), British politician and judge
- Thomas Aitchison-Denman, 2nd Baron Denman (1805–1894), British politician
- Thomas Denman, 3rd Baron Denman (1874–1954), British politician, Governor-General of Australia
- Tommy Denman, actor in Silks and Saddles
