= Ichabod Charles Wright =

English scholar (1795–1871)

- Wright in 1840 by Charles Turner
- Born: 11 April 1795; Mapperley Hall, Nottinghamshire, England
- Died: 14 October 1871 (aged 76); Heathfield Hall, Burwash, Sussex, England
- Education: Christ Church, Oxford
- Spouse: Theodosia Denman (m. 1825)
- Children: Charles Ichabod Wright
- Relatives: Thomas Denman, 1st Baron Denman (father-in-law); Thomas Aitchison-Denman, 2nd Baron Denman (brother-in-law); Joseph Denman (brother-in-law); George Denman (brother-in-law)

Ichabod Charles Wright (11 April 1795 – 14 October 1871) was an English scholar, translator, poet and accountant. He is best known for his translation of important works of Italian literature, notably the works of Dante's Divine Comedy.

== Biography ==
Wright was born on 11 April 1795 Mapperley Hall in Nottinghamshire to Ichabod Wright (1767–1862), a banker and freeman of Nottingham, and Harriet Maria Wright (née Day; died 1843). The eldest of 13 siblings, Wright was the second cousin of industrialist and philanthropist Francis Wright.

Educated at Eton College from 1808 to 1814, Wright entered Christ Church, Oxford on 22 April 1814. Graduating with second-class BA honours in 1817 and MA in 1820, holding an open fellowship at Magdalen College, Oxford, from 1819 to 1825. In 1825, he joined his father in the banking profession. Wright indulged in much scholarly study alongside his profession and in the 1830s developed a passion for Italian literature and a thirst for the language. He translated the works of Dante, notably Divina commedia in three instalments, Inferno, Purgatorio, and Paradiso, which earned him critical acclaim. These were published by Messrs. Longmans in 1833, 1836, and 1840 respectively and reprinted in a second edition in 1845. They were dedicated respectively to Lord Brougham, Archbishop Howley, and his father-in-law Lord Denman who also shared an interest in Italian literature.

He proceeded to publish works related to his profession and in 1841 he published Thoughts on Currency, and in 1847, Evils of the Currency. In 1855 he published The War and our Resources, and in 1865 he published a translation of the Iliad of Homer in blank verse, translated between 1859 and 1864. In 1864 he wrote A letter to the Dean of Canterbury, on the Homeric lectures of Matthew Arnold; Matthew Arnold was a distinguished professor of poetry at the University of Oxford. His final work A Selection of Psalms in Verse was written in 1867, although many of his poems were printed privately after his death in 1873.

== Personal life ==
On 21 December 1825, Wright married Theodosia Denman (1806–1895), the daughter of Thomas Denman, 1st Baron Denman. The couple's children included Charles Ichabod Wright, a politician and Conservative Party MP.

On 14 October 1871, Wright died at Heathfield Hall, Burwash, the home of his eldest son.
