= Gilbert E. Primrose =

Scottish footballer (1848–1935)

Gilbert Edward Primrose (27 February 1848 – 16 February 1935) was a Scottish amateur sportsman who made one appearance for the Scottish football XI against England in the representative match played in February 1871. He later settled in Helidon, near Brisbane in Queensland, Australia where he became a director of the Helidon Spa Water Company. In 1959, the company merged with Owen Gardener & Sons to become Kirks.

== Family and education ==
Primrose was born at Dalmeny, near Edinburgh, the third of the six sons of the Hon. Bouverie Francis Primrose (1813–1898) and his wife, Frederica Sophia Anson (1814–1867). His father was the son of Archibald Primrose, 4th Earl of Rosebery and Harriett Bouverie. His mother was the daughter of Thomas Anson, 1st Viscount Anson and Lady Anne Margaret Coke.

His brothers included Francis Archibald, (born 1843), Henry William (1846–1923), who became chairman of the Board of the Inland Revenue, and George Anson Primrose (1849–1930), who became a vice-admiral.

Primrose was baptised at St. John's Episcopal Church, Edinburgh and educated at Trinity College, Glenalmond between 1858 and 1865, where he played in the school's cricket XI.

On 13 May 1893, in Brisbane, Queensland, he married Jessie Catherine Costelloe, daughter of Lieutenant Costelloe of Lackeen Castle, Birr, Ireland.

== Football career ==
On 25 February 1871, Primrose (a member of the Civil Service club) was selected as a late replacement for William Baillie-Hamilton for the international football match against England. (In some contemporary match reports, he is listed as "C.E. Primrose".) The match ended in a 1–1 draw with goals from Charles Nepean and Robert Walker. In many present-day databases, Primrose is confused with his elder brother, Henry, who played for Scotland on 19 November 1870.

== Helidon Spa Water Company ==
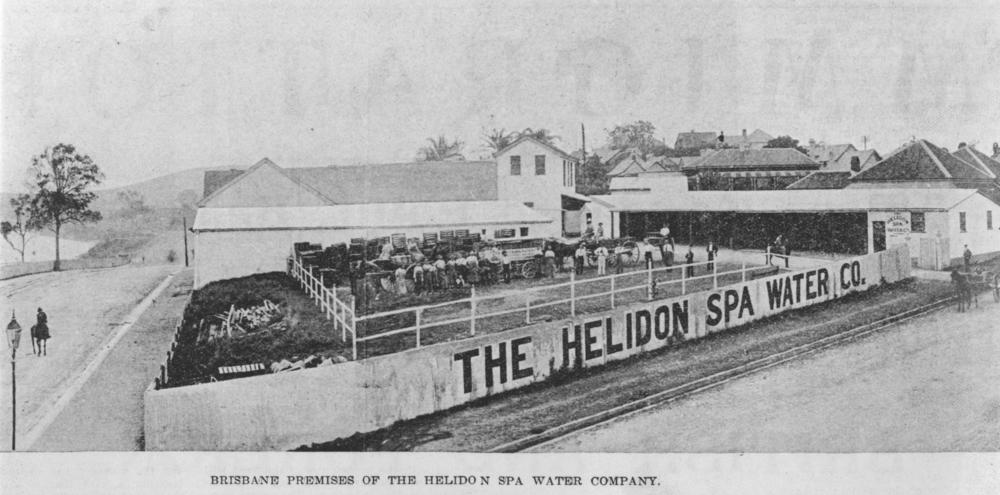
Brisbane premises of the Helidon Spa Water Co., 1899

Primrose later emigrated to Queensland, Australia where his brother Francis had already settled. In January 1871, Francis is listed as having made a "pre-emptive selection" of 264 acres of agricultural land at Emu Creek, about 17 miles north of Crows Nest. The quality of the water at Helidon had long been known to the indigenous population who claimed that their strength came from the water. In 1879, chemist Reginald Larard was selling water from the spring as "Oogar Dang Water", and by 1881 had entered a partnership with Gilbert Primrose who, had purchased the agricultural land around the springs, establishing the Helidon Spa Water Company.

When Larard left, Primrose became managing director of the company. Describing that the former partnership "had expired by effluxion of time", this led Primrose to seek new investors in a proposed limited company. In October 1885, a special train was laid to transport potential investors from Brisbane to view the springs and taste its water, described as "full of sparkling effervescence and perfectly clear". Concerns over breakages led the company to start transporting the water from Helidon to a new bottling factory in Brisbane. In October 1895 Primrose sued a Jean de Raeve for an unpaid debt of £19 0s. 7d due to the company. The company's success was such that competitors were frequently taken to court for breach of copyright. In May 1897, Primrose successfully took action against Alfred Lucas Gardner, trading as "Owen Gardner and Sons" who had been selling soft drinks in Brisbane since 1850, for "infringement of his patent rights in connection with the sale of Helidon Spa water". This prevented Gardner and Sons from using the words 'Helidon' or 'Spa Water' on their bottles or advertisements, until a similar suit against Edward Campbell of the 'Brisbane Aerated Water Company' was appealed and the rules were relaxed.

To compete with competition from imported products, Helidon Spa Water Company and Owen Gardner & Sons merged in 1959 to become Helidon Gardner Pty Ltd, trading under the name Kirk's, named for Owen Garner & Sons flagship product "Kirk's Ginger Ale". Brisbane bottler, Tristrams was also invited to take part in the merger, but declined. Today, Kirks is owned by Coca-Cola Amatil, and continue to produce a variety of soft drinks available Australia wide.

== Later life ==
During his time in Queensland, Primrose became a captain in the Queensland Scottish Rifles and the Queensland Defence Force, and was also a JP.

In May 1899, Primrose was appointed to represent Queensland at the "Greater Britain Exhibition" to be held at Earls Court, London.

In October 1900, Primrose and his family published a notice in The "Sydney Morning Herald", thanking "their many kind friends and sympathisers for wreaths and letters of sympathy received during their recent sad bereavement".

In 1909, Primrose returned to England where he died at Worthing, West Sussex on 16 February 1935.
