= Denman =

Denman may refer to:

== Places ==
- Denman Glacier, near Antarctica
- Denman Shire, New South Wales, Australia
  - Denman, New South Wales, a town in the Hunter Valley of Australia
- Denman Island, one of the Gulf Islands of British Columbia, Canada
- Denman, Nebraska, a community in the United States
- Denman Wildlife Area, Rogue Valley, Oregon, United States
- Denman Mountain, New York, United States
- Denman Peak, Washington, United States

== People ==
- Denman (surname), people with the surname
- Denman Fink (1880–1956), American artist and magazine illustrator
- Denman Ross (1853–1935), American painter, art collector and professor

== Other uses ==
- Denman (horse), a racehorse, winner of the 2008 Cheltenham Gold Cup
- Denman Arena, a sports arena located in Vancouver, British Columbia
- Denman College, an adult education college in Oxfordshire, England

== See also ==
- Baron Denman, a title in the peerage of the United Kingdom
