= Attractive nuisance doctrine =

Law covering dangerous property

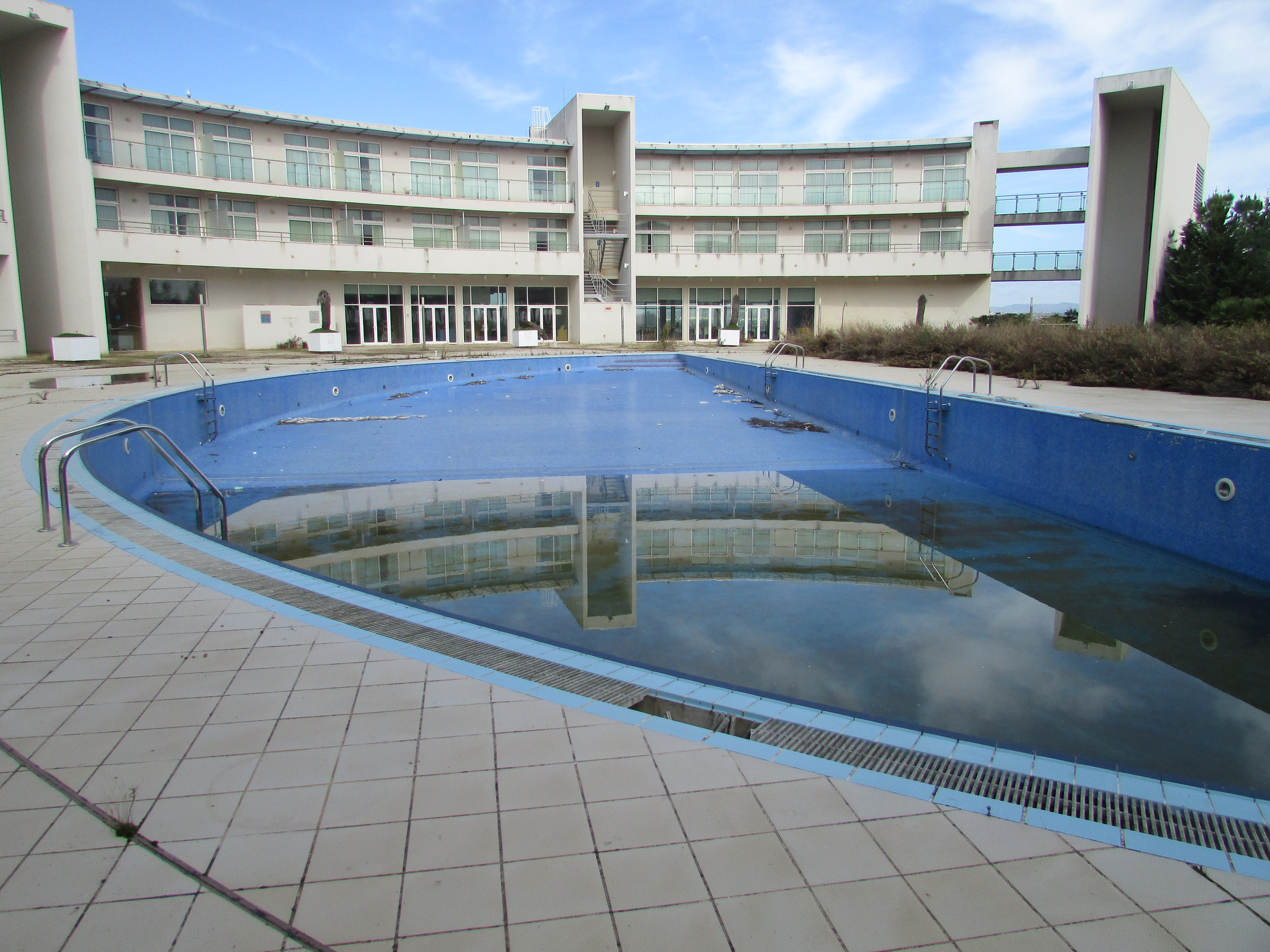
An abandoned swimming pool may be considered an attractive nuisance

The attractive nuisance doctrine applies to the law of torts in some jurisdictions. It states that a landowner may be held liable for injuries to children trespassing on the land if the injury is caused by an object on the land that is likely to attract children. The doctrine is designed to protect children who are unable to appreciate the risk posed by the object, by imposing a liability on the landowner. The doctrine has been applied to hold landowners liable for injuries caused by abandoned cars, piles of lumber or sand, trampolines, and swimming pools. However, it can be applied to virtually anything on the property.

There is no set cutoff point that defines youth. The courts will evaluate each "child" on a case-by-case basis to see if the "child" qualifies as a youth. If it is determined that the child was able to understand and appreciate the hazard, the doctrine of attractive nuisance will not likely apply.

Under the old common law, the plaintiff (either the child, or a parent suing on the child's behalf) had to show that it was the hazardous condition itself which lured the child onto the landowner's property. However, most jurisdictions have statutorily altered this condition, and now require only that the injury was foreseeable by the landowner.

== History ==
The attractive nuisance doctrine emerged from case law in England, starting with Lynch v Nurdin in 1841. In that case, an opinion by Lord Chief Justice Thomas Denman held that the owner of a cart left unattended on the street could be held liable for injuries to a child who climbed onto the cart and fell. The doctrine was first applied in the United States in Sioux City & Pacific Railroad Co. v. Stout, an 1873 case from Nebraska in which a railroad company was held liable for injuries to a child who climbed onto an unsecured railway turntable.

The doctrine has since been adopted in some other common law jurisdictions, such as Canada, but not universally. The history of the New York law of attractive nuisance is especially convoluted.

== Conditions ==
According to the Restatement of Torts standard, which is followed in many jurisdictions in the United States, there are five conditions that must be met for a land owner to be liable for tort damages to a child trespasser as a result of artificial hazards:

- The place where the condition exists is one on which the possessor knows or has reason to know that children are likely to trespass, and
- The condition is one of which the possessor knows or has reason to know and which he realizes or should realize will involve an unreasonable risk of death or serious bodily harm to such children,
- The children, because of their youth, do not discover the condition or realize the risk involved in inter-meddling with it or in coming within the area made dangerous by it,
- The utility to the possessor of maintaining the condition and the burden of eliminating the danger are slight as compared with the risk to children involved, and
- The possessor fails to exercise reasonable care to eliminate the danger or otherwise to protect the children.

== Jurisdictions ==
US states that use the Restatement test include:

- Alabama: adopted in the 1976 case Tolbert v. Gulsby, 333 So. 2d 129 (Ala. 1976)
- Arizona: – see case: Spur Feeding Co. v. Fernandez, 106 Ariz. 143, 472 P.2d 12 (Ariz. 1970)
- Kentucky: – see case: Louisville N. R. Co. v. Vaughn, 166 S.W.2d 43, 292 Ky. 120 (Ky. 1942)
- Minnesota: adopted in the 1935 case Gimmestad v. Rose Brothers Co., 261 N.W. 194, 194 Minn. 531 (Minn. 1935) see also Johnson v. Clement F. Sculley Construction Co., 95 N.W.2d 409 (Minn. 1959)
- Missouri – see case: Anderson v. Cahill, 485 S.W.2d 76 (Mo. 1972)
- New Jersey – see case: Simmel v. New Jersey Coop Co.,, 143 A.2d 521, 28 N.J. 1 (N.J. 1958)
- New Mexico: adopted in the 1998 case Carmona v. Hagerman Irrigation Co., 957 P.2d 44 (N.M. 1998)
- North Carolina – see case: Dean v. Wilson Construction Co.,, 111 S.E.2d 827, 251 N.C. 581 (N.C. 1960)
- Ohio – see case: Bennett v. Stanley, 92 Ohio St.3d 35 (2001)
- Pennsylvania: adopted in the 1942 case Thompson v. Reading Co., 343 Pa. 585, 23 A.2d 729 (Pa. 1942)
- South Carolina – see case: Henson v. International Paper Co., 650 S.E.2d 74 (S.C. 2007)
- Utah – see case: Pullan v. Steinmetz, 16 P.3d 1245 (2000)
- Tennessee: adopted in the 1976 case Metropolitan Government of Nashville v. Counts, 541 S.W.2d 133 (Tenn. 1976)
- Texas – see case: Texas Utilities Electric Co. v. Timmons, 947 S.W.2d 191 (Tex. 1997)
- Wyoming – see case: Thunder Hawk By and Through Jensen v. Union Pacific R. Co, 1995 WY 32, 891 P.2d 773 (Wyo. 1995)
