= George Primrose =

George Primrose may refer to:

- George H. Primrose (1852–1919), minstrel performer, one half of the comedy duo Primrose and West
- George Anson Primrose (1849–1930), British naval officer
