= Eusebius Andrews =

Eusebius Andrews may refer to:

- William Eusebius Andrews (1773–1837), English journalist and editor
- Eusebius Andrews (Royalist) (died 1650), English royalist
