= Henry Primrose =

Scottish civil servant (1846–1923)

Sir Henry William Primrose KCB CSI ISO PC (22 August 1846 – 17 June 1923) was a Scottish civil servant. He joined the Treasury in 1869, served as private secretary to the Viceroy of India from 1880 to 1884 and to Gladstone in 1886. He was secretary of the Office of Works from 1887 to 1895. He became chairman of the Board of the Inland Revenue from 1899 to 1907.

In his youth, he made one appearance for the Scottish football XI against England in the representative match played in November 1870.

== Family and education ==
Primrose was born at Dalmeny, near Edinburgh, the second of the six sons of the Hon. Bouverie Francis Primrose (1813–1898) and his wife, Frederica Sophia Anson (1814–1867).

His father was the son of Archibald Primrose, 4th Earl of Rosebery and Harriett Bouverie. His mother was the daughter of Thomas Anson, 1st Viscount Anson and Lady Anne Margaret Coke.

His brothers included Francis Archibald, (born 1843), Gilbert Edward (1848–1935), who also made one international football appearance for Scotland, and George Anson Primrose (1849–1930), who became a vice-admiral.

Primrose was educated at Trinity College, Glenalmond, between 1855 and 1864, where he was captain of both the school's football and cricket XIs. In 1864, he went up to Balliol College, Oxford where he obtained second class degrees in classical moderations (1867) and in the final honour school of law and modern history (1869).

=== Wife and children ===
On 2 November 1888, he married Mrs. Helen Mary Walker, the daughter of Gilbert McMicking of Wigtownshire. She had been married twice previously: first, to the Hon. Richard Denman, the grandson of Thomas Denman, 1st Baron Denman, who was Lord Chief Justice from 1832 to 1850 and spent a month in 1834 as interim Chancellor of the Exchequer.

The marriage to Denman lasted from 1871 to 1878, and ended in divorce. There were three children of the marriage:

- Hon. Anna Maria Heywood Denman (c. 1874–1965) who married Sir John Emmott Barlow, 1st Baronet (1857–1932), M.P. for Frome from 1892 to 1895, and from 1896 to 1918.
- Thomas Denman, 3rd Baron Denman of Dovedale (1874–1954), who became Governor-General of Australia from 1911 to 1914.
- Sir Richard Douglas Denman, 1st Baronet (1876–1957), who became M.P. for Carlisle from 1910 to 1918 and for Leeds Central from 1929 to 1945.

Her second marriage, to James Montgomery Walker lasted from 1879 to 1888 but was dissolved on the grounds of desertion.

Lady Primrose died in 1919: there was one child of the marriage:

- Archibald Henry Reginald Primrose, born 14 December 1889.

== Football career ==
In his youth, Primrose was a member of the Civil Service Football Club. In November 1870, he was selected to represent Scotland in the second of a series of international representative matches against England; the Scottish team captain, James Kirkpatrick was a fellow civil servant. Primrose played as one of the forwards with the match ending in a victory for the English by a single goal.

He was selected for further matches but was unavailable; for the February 1872 match, the match report says that "the only change[s] in the list of players previously published was the substitution . . . for Scotland, C. Thompson for Primrose".

== Civil service ==
On leaving Oxford, he joined the civil service, entering the Treasury in 1869. From April to June 1880, he was secretary to the Prime Minister, William Gladstone before being sent to India as secretary to Lord Ripon, the newly appointed viceroy. In January 1885, Primrose was appointed a Companion of the "Most Exalted Order of the Star of India".

At the end of Ripon's term in office in India in 1884, Primrose returned to work with Gladstone until the fall of the Government in June 1885. He again rejoined Gladstone following his return to office in February 1886, becoming head of the Downing Street secretariat. Described as "the least admiring of Gladstone's secretaries" Primrose became "a useful conduit of information" to his cousin, Rosebery, who was then foreign secretary.

In August 1886, he was appointed Secretary to the Office of Works. In January 1895, he was appointed a Companion of the "Most Honourable Order of the Bath".

== Treasury ==
In May 1895, Primrose returned to the Treasury when he was appointed a Commissioner of Her Majesty's Customs, becoming chairman.

Primrose was one of several former private secretaries to Gladstone who attended at his funeral at Westminster Abbey on 28 May 1898.

In January 1899, he was promoted to Knight Commander of the Order of The Bath; shortly afterwards, he was also promoted to become chairman of the board of the Inland Revenue, a position he held until he retired from the civil service in 1907, aged sixty-one.

At the Treasury, he had a reputation as "a strict Gladstonian at a time when Treasury attitudes were fast changing". In 1895, he commented that:

responsible politicians on the Liberal side would be glad to see the area of indirect taxation widened, and would not undo what had been done in that way. On occasions of great emergency, when large demands are to be made on the people, I think you must have a partial resort to indirect taxation; and on occasions when demands less large are to be made on the people, if those demands have a character of apparent permanence, then also, I think, you ought to call in the aid of indirect taxation.

His evidence to the select committee on Income Tax in 1906 vigorously defended Victorian precepts. He opposed the scheme to introduce a graduated Income Tax and expressed the view that death duties could be "regarded as partaking to some extent of the nature of a deferred Income Tax". He disliked the proposal to introduce a higher rate of tax on unearned ("precarious") income than on earned ("permanent") income.

I have indicated that my opinion is against charging a higher rate upon the income that is derived from savings as long as those savings are in the hands of those persons which have made the savings.

== Later career ==
After his retirement, he remained active in public life, serving on several public bodies and commissions. Primrose was described as "a distinguished and valuable public servant, especially known for the clarity of his minutes and reports".

He was Chairman of the Commercial Pacific Cable Company from 1907 until 1914 and was a director of the Reversionary Interest Society from 1911.

Shortly after his retirement, he was appointed chairman of a royal commission to enquire into the financial relationship between the Supreme Government in India and the various provincial governments, although he resigned the appointment after a month, to be replaced by Sir Charles Hobhouse.

In 1911 he chaired a committee on the financial clauses of the Irish Home Rule Bill, a subject with which he had had experience since 1886. He proposed that an Irish government should have full control over its revenue, with the British government providing some additional funds to meet the deficit. His plan was rejected by Herbert Samuel, who drew up the financial clauses of the Home Rule Bill of 1912, as it was thought to offer excessive financial autonomy to the Irish.

In 1912, he was a member of the MacDonnell royal commission on the civil service and in 1913 of the Loreburn royal commission on railways.

In September 1914, Primrose was appointed chairman of the Welsh church commission consequent on Welsh disestablishment and of the commission set up to enquire into the supply of sugar after the First World War. In 1918 he was a member of the Bradbury committee on staff retrenchment in government offices.

In June 1912, he was sworn into the Privy Council, an unusual honour for a civil servant.

== Death ==
Like his cousin, Lord Rosebery, Primrose was a chronic insomniac which led to depression. On the morning of 17 June 1923, he was found in Kensington Gardens (near his home at Ennismore Gardens), having shot himself; he was taken to St George's Hospital, where he died almost immediately.

Government offices
| Preceded by Sir Robert Hamilton | Chairman of HM Customs; 1895–1899 | Succeeded by Sir George Lisle Ryder |
| Preceded by Sir George Murray | Chairman of the Board of Inland Revenue; 1899–1907 | Succeeded by The Lord Chalmers |
