= William Denman =

William Denman may refer to:

- William Denman (judge) (1872–1959), Judge of the United States Court of Appeals for the Ninth Circuit
- William Denman (publisher) (1784–1870), New York newspaperman
