= Lynch v Nurdin =

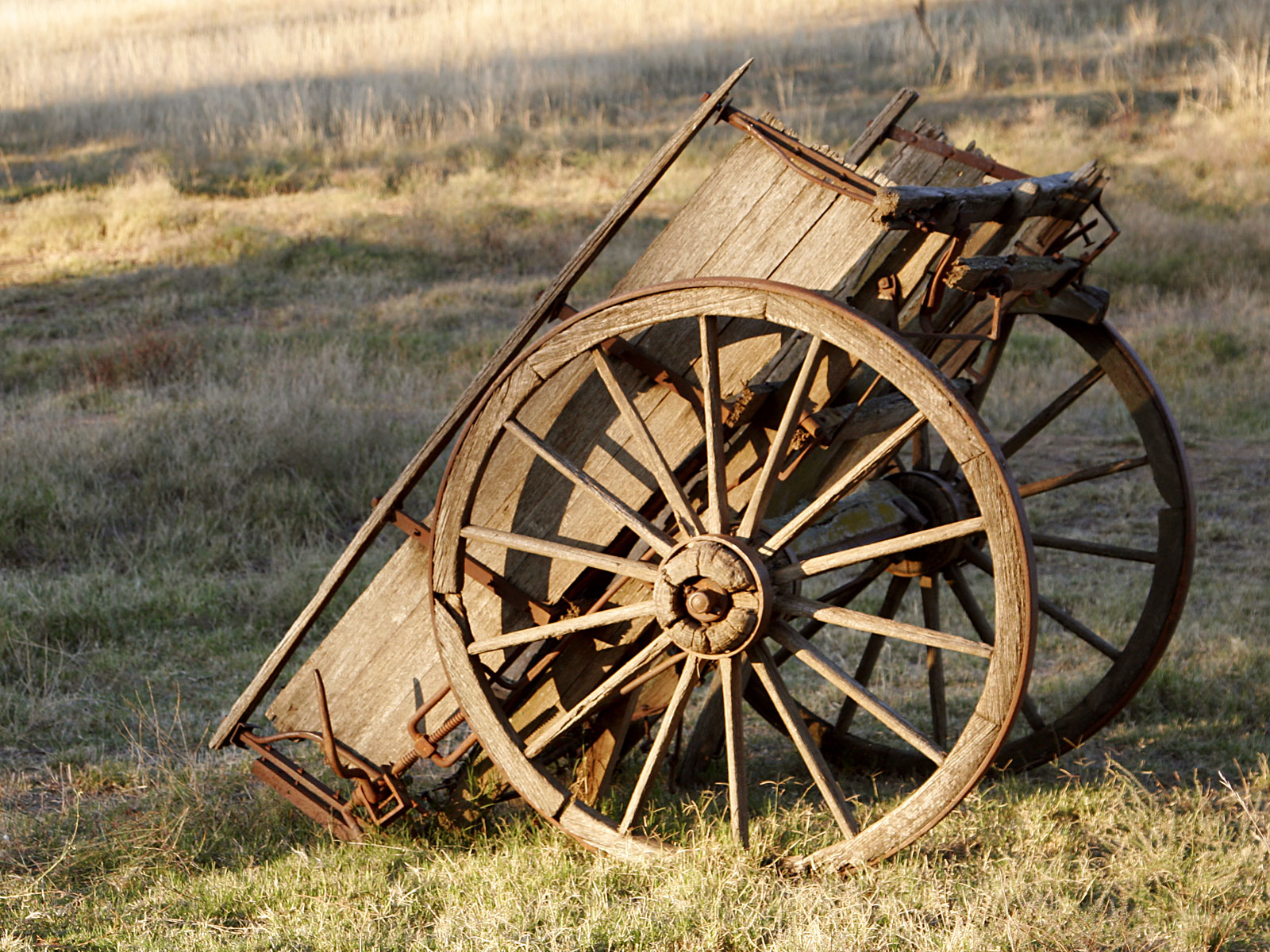
An unsecured cart was considered an attractive nuisance to children in Lynch v. Nurdin

Lynch v Nurdin 1 QB 29, (1841) Arn and H 158, (1841) 113 ER 1041 was the first case law to define the attractive nuisance doctrine and was cited by later sources in the United States and the Commonwealth of Nations in developing the doctrine.

The Lord Chief Justice, Lord Denman wrote the opinion, which held that the owner of a cart left unattended on the street could be held liable for injuries to a child who climbed onto the cart and fell. The seven-year-old child was "acting under natural impulse, in obedience to his instinctive nature, [and] was enticed to meddle with the attractive cart, and that the danger of the situation was created by the defendant in failing to observe the tendency of children to play about unprotected vehicles."
