= Bouverie Francis Primrose =

British landowner and administrator

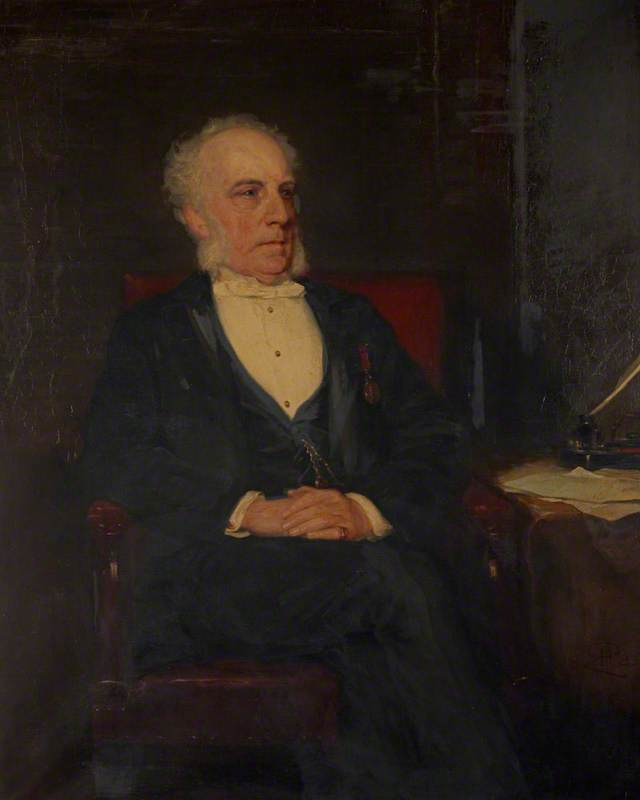
Bouverie Francis Primrose, 1883 portrait

Bouverie Francis Primrose CB FRSE (1813–1898) was a British landowner and administrator.

== Life ==
He was born on 19 September 1813 near Edinburgh the second son of Archibald Primrose, 4th Earl of Rosebery and his wife Harriett Bouverie. In 1817 the family moved into the then-new Dalmeny House.

In 1839 he was appointed Receiver General for the Post Office in Scotland. He also served as secretary of the Joint Board of Manufacture and Fisheries for most of his life.

He held the rank of Lt Colonel in the Queen's City of Edinburgh Rifle Volunteer Brigade.

He was elected a Fellow of the Royal Society of Edinburgh in 1849. His proposer was Sir John Murray, Lord Murray.

He retired in 1882 and died on 20 March 1898.

== Family ==
In 1838 he married Frederica Sophia Anson (1814-1867), daughter of Thomas Anson, 1st Viscount Anson. Their eight children included Henry Primrose (1846-1923), footballer Gilbert E. Primrose (1848–1935), and Vice Admiral George Anson Primrose (1849-1930).

He was uncle to Archibald Primrose, 5th Earl of Rosebery who served as the British Prime Minister 1894/5.

== Artistic recognition ==
His portrait (c.1870) by Robert Herdman is held by the Scottish National Portrait Gallery but is rarely displayed.
