= Thomas Aitchison-Denman, 2nd Baron Denman =

British aristocrat and politician

Thomas Aitchison-Denman, 2nd Baron Denman (30 July 1805 – 9 August 1894), was a British aristocrat and politician. He was born in London, the son of Thomas Denman and the former Theodosia Anne Vevers. His father was made Attorney General in 1830, and in 1834 became Lord Chief Justice and was raised to the peerage as Baron Denman. His grandfather was the obstetrician Dr Thomas Denman, and his brothers George and Joseph were a High Court judge and admiral, respectively.

Denman attended Eton College and Brasenose College, Oxford. He was called to the bar in 1833, as a member of Lincoln's Inn, and thereafter worked as an associate to his father. Denman succeeded to the barony in 1854, and sat regularly in the House of Lords for the rest of his life. However, he "won notoriety rather from his eccentricities than any eminent qualifications". Dods listed him as a Liberal until 1884, and thereafter as a crossbencher. His pet projects included women's suffrage and the introduction of a time limit on speeches; he introduced multiple bills for each, but none even got to a second reading. Denman married twice, but had no children. He died at Berwick-upon-Tweed at the age of 89, and was succeeded in the barony by his 19-year-old grandnephew Thomas Denman – a future Governor-General of Australia.

== In popular culture ==
Denman was portrayed by Leslie French in the Granada Television series Lady Killers, in an episode depicting the trial of Kate Webster.

Peerage of the United Kingdom
Preceded by Thomas Denman	Baron Denman; 1854–1894	Succeeded by Thomas Denman
