= Kirks =

Australian soft drink company

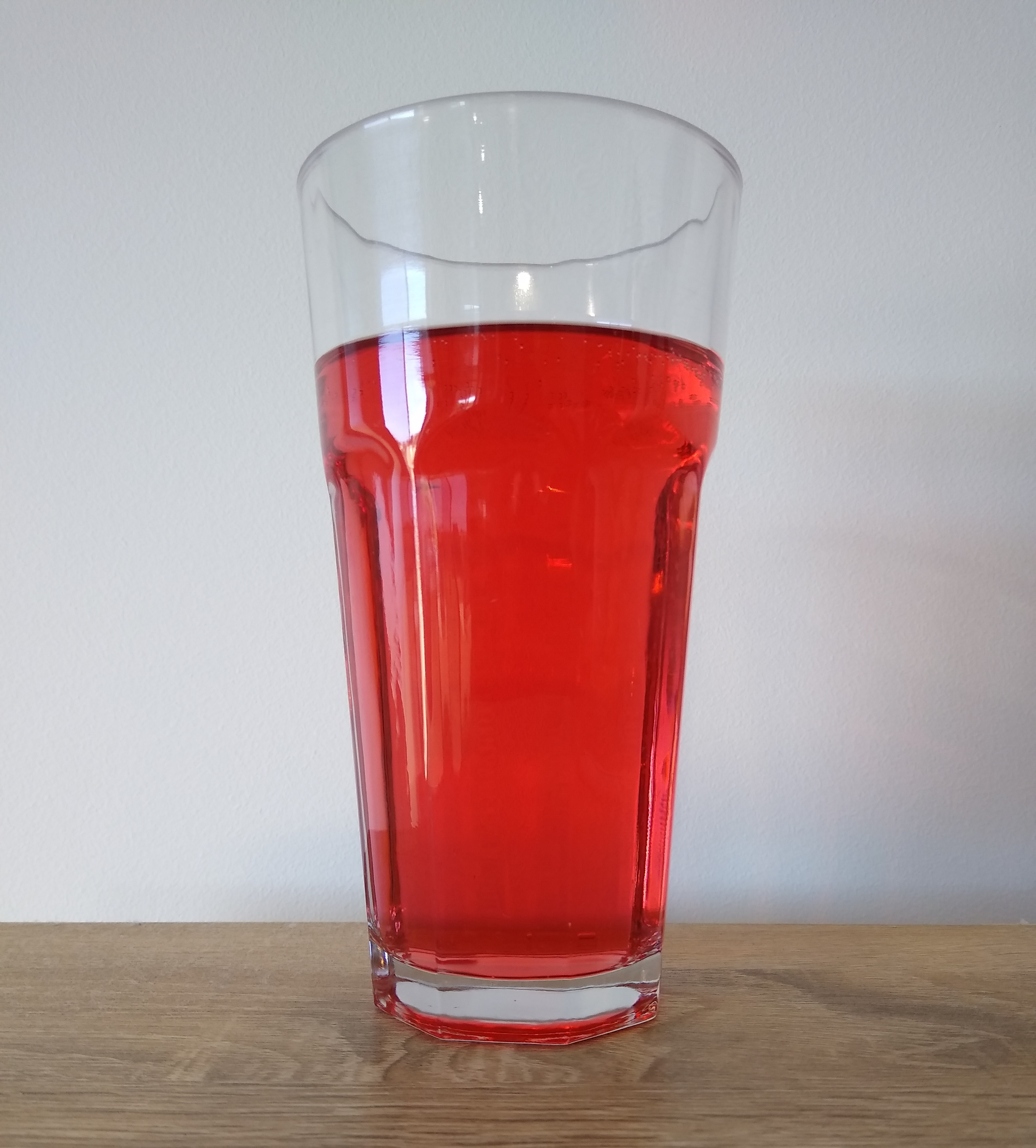
- Kirks creaming soda
- Type: Subsidiary
- Industry: Beverage
- Founded: 1865; 161 years ago
- Founder: Reginald Larard and Gilbert E. Primrose
- Headquarters: Queensland, Australia
- Parent: Coca-Cola Company

Kirks is a soft drink manufacturer founded in Queensland, Australia in 1865, producing a selection of soft drink flavours.

== History ==
=== Before Kirks ===
The Helidon Spa Water Company was founded in 1881 as a partnership between chemist Reginald Larard, and Scottish entrepreneur Gilbert E. Primrose to bottle the spring water of Helidon, Queensland. In May 1897 competitor Alfred Lucas Gardner, trading as Owen Gardner and Sons since 1850 was sued by the Helidon Spa Water Company for "infringement of his patent rights in connection with the sale of Helidon Spa water". This prevented Gardner and Sons from using the words ‘Helidon’ or ‘Spa Water’ on their bottles or advertisements, until a similar suit against Edward Campbell of the 'Brisbane Aerated Water Company' was appealed and the rules were relaxed.

After Gardner's death in 1888, the business passed to his sons Alfred and Ernest. Following Arthur's death in 1917, management duties were maintained by a Mr. T. Kirkpatrick. With chemist W Doolan, Kirkpatrick developed 'Kirk's Ginger Ale', which would go on to become the company's flagship product. During the 1930s, Kirkpatrick left Owen Gardner & Sons to work for main competitor, Brisbane bottler 'Tristram's', selling 'Kirk's Ginger Beer' under their brand. For this, Tristram's were taken to court by then Owen Gardner & Sons' owner Robert Sweeney, asserting their exclusive right to the Kirk's name. After winning the case, the company adopted Kirks as the brand name for its entire soft drink range.

In 1959, to compete with imported products such as Coca-Cola, the long time competitors, Helidon Spa Water Company, and Owen Gardner & Sons merged to form Helidon Gardner Pty Ltd, trading together under the popular name "kirk's". Tristram's was also invited to take part in the merger, but declined. Though the claim "Since 1865" is present on Kirks' current packaging, what event this date refers to is unclear, as it does not coincide with either the founding date of Helidon Spa Water Company, Owen Gardner & Sons, or the establishment of the Kirks name itself.

=== 1980s ===
During the 1980s, the Kirks, Shelleys (NSW), and Gest (WA) brands shared a range of drinks with consistent packaging style and marketing material. Each brand was marketed to its own state of origin.

=== Merger ===
In 2000, now under Coca-Cola Amatil, the brands Kirks, Shelleys and Gest, along with Halls (SA), and Marchants, were unified, all taking the name of the Queensland bottler nationwide. The relaunch campaign aimed to evoke nostalgia for the door to door soft drink delivery by local brands in the 1960s to early 1980s. Remnants of the original structure remain, as some flavours traditionally produced by local bottlers are only available in certain states.

In 2006, Kirks' packaging and advertising materials were redesigned, and again in 2014 with a more modern look.

=== 2020s ===
In May 2021, Coca-Cola Amatil was acquired by the British Coca-Cola Europacific Partners (CCEP) for A$9.8 billion, which included Kirks as part of the sale. In February 2022, CCEP agreed to sell Kirks, as well as other brands including Mount Franklin, Deep Spring, Bisleri Chinotto and Fruitbox, to the US-based Coca-Cola Company for A$275 million.

== Products ==
Much of the Kirks range originated from flavours first produced by smaller bottlers prior to acquisition by Kirks, or the 2000 merger under Coca-Cola Amatil. A number of products remain available only in the region of its original manufacturer. Some are still considered local icons.

Kirks ginger Ale was originally sold by Owen Gardner & Sons before the company was merged with the Helidon Spa Water Company to become "kirk's" in 1959. Before the 2000 merger under Coca-Cola Amatil, Kirks sold its creaming soda under the name "Kandy". Fruita and Sno Drop were originally products of Halls, whereas Kole Beer was produced by Gest. The brand's "Olde Stoney" ginger beer is the original Shelley's Old Style Stoney Beer which refers to the stone pottery bottles that non-alcoholic ginger beer was sold in during the 1800s. Pasito and Creaming Soda are also original Shelley's varieties.

Kirks Originals: Creaming Soda, Lemonade, Big Sars, Old Stoney Ginger Beer, Lemon Squash, Pasito, Portello, Orange, Ginger Ale (QLD Only), Kolé Beer (WA Only), Sno Drop (SA Only), Fruita (VIC, SA & TAS Only)

Kirks Surprises Limited Edition: Strawberries and Cream, Watermelonade (watermelon Chupa Chup), Lime Spider, Enchanted Fruits (raspberry, blackberry and strawberry Chupa Chup), Sticky Toffee Apple, Tropical Bluetopia (pineapple and berry), Summer Sorbet (mango and peach), Fizzy Flamingo (peach and raspberry), Sunny Stardust (pineapple and strawberry).

Mixer Drinks: Soda Water, Tonic Water, Dry Ginger Ale

Other: Brewed Ginger Beer

Diet varieties of some flavours are also produced.

== See also ==
- List of brand name soft drinks products
- List of soft drink flavors
- List of soft drinks by country
