= Abandoned vehicle =

Vehicle which is no longer in use

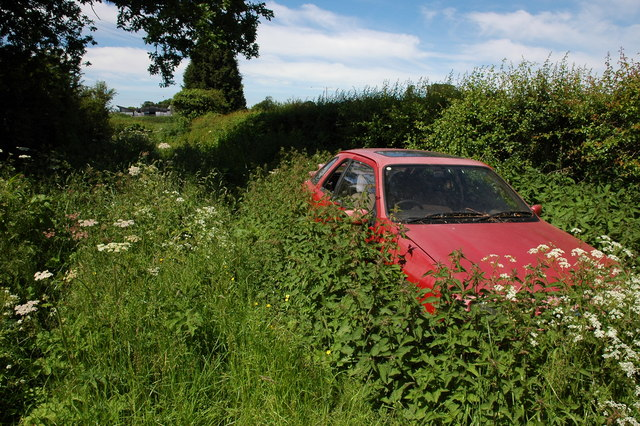
A car abandoned on an overgrown bridleway in Herefordshire, England

Abandoned vehicles are decrepit cars or car wrecks or cars that have become useless in other ways, which are abandoned and illegally dumped in the environment. Abandoned vehicles will be tagged with an official notice when found or reported. Criteria for "abandonment" may differ, and a minimum duration of abandonment in the order of a few days to weeks is required. When reporting such a vehicle, the required data will usually comprise the exact location, the make, colour and type, and - if available and readable - possibly the VIN and the licence plate. Costs for removal will as a rule be taken by public councils.

== Environmental impact ==
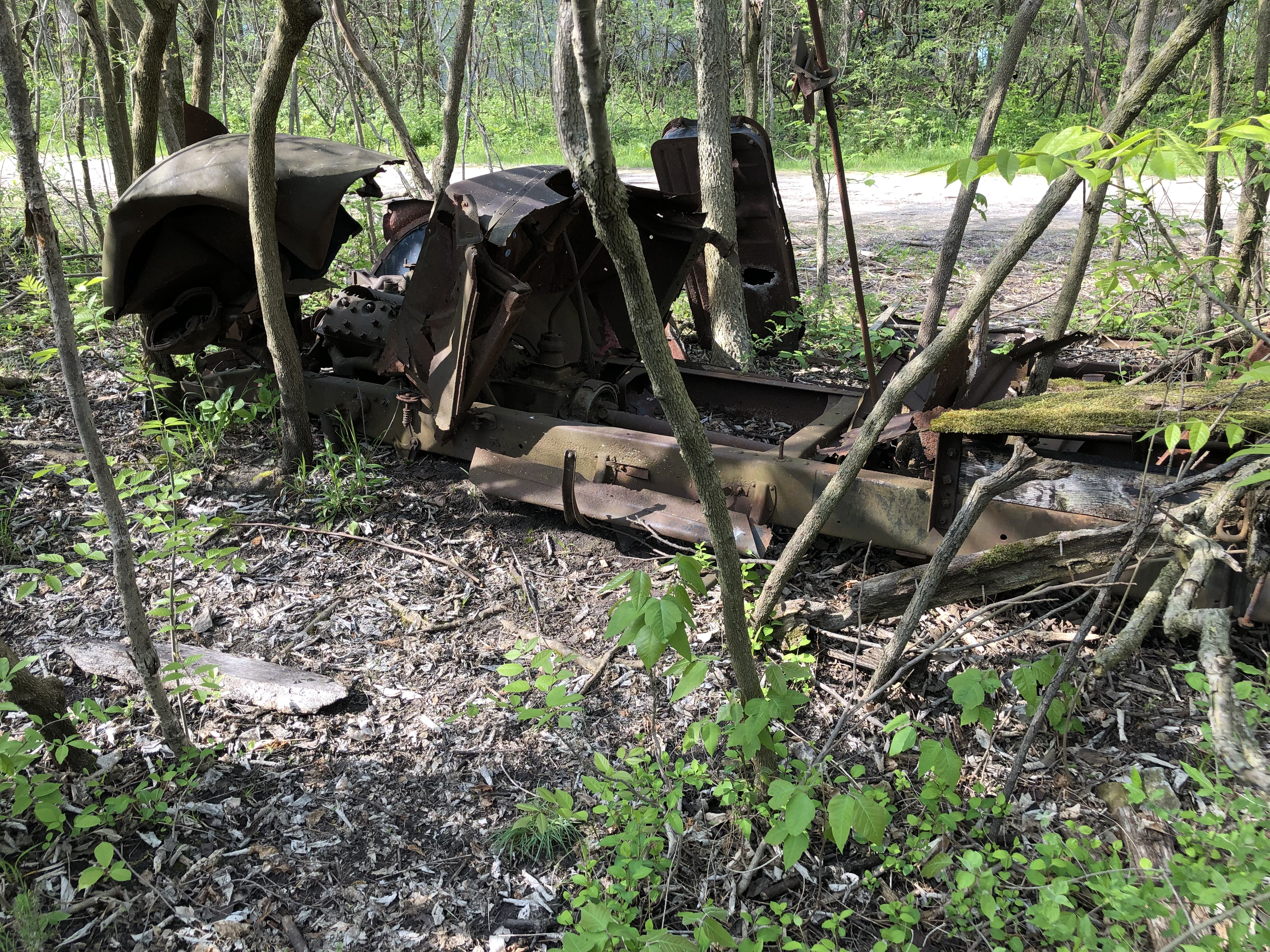
A long abandoned truck in an advanced state of decay.

Abandoned cars use up space in the environment and, just like other waste, pose considerable risks for public health.

== Specific rules and regulations ==
A common definition is that the vehicle must have been left on private or public property for a minimum duration (≥ 24 hours) or it hasn't been reclaimed after being impounded after a minimum number of days.

=== United States ===
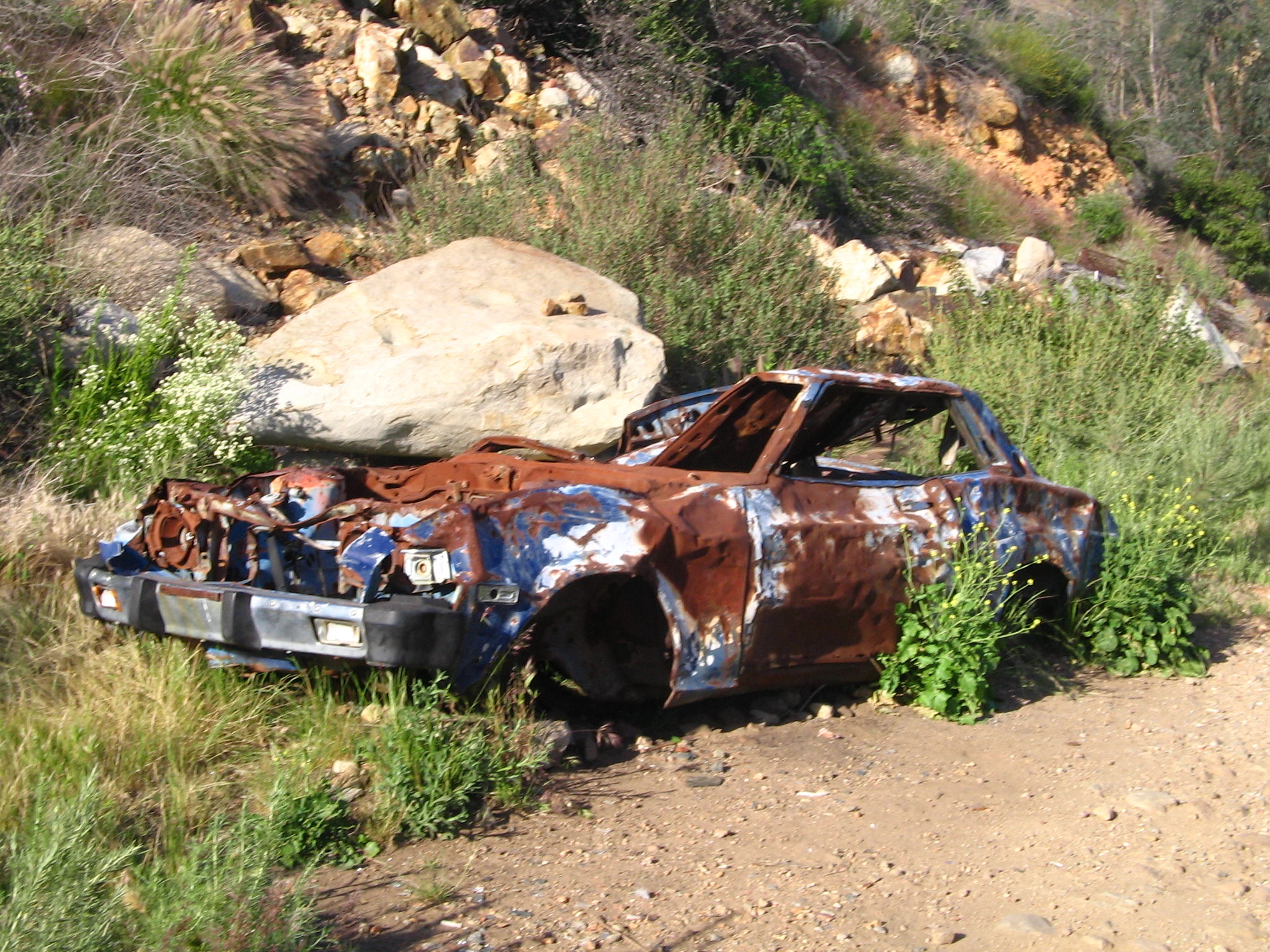
An abandoned car in California

The definition of an "abandoned vehicle" varies widely across the states and larger cities of the US.

A number of differing criteria are listed here in no specific order:

- New York: With License Plates: An abandoned vehicle with at least one fixed metal license plate or in-transit paper registration plate can be reported to law enforcement if it has been left on public property for at least 48 hours. The vehicle's owner will be responsible for all towing and storage fees. Without License Plates: A vehicle without license plates abandoned on a street or sidewalk can be reported to the Department of Sanitation, who will investigate and tag the vehicle. Once it is tagged, it will be removed within three business days.

=== Australia ===
As in the US, there is not one single set of rules. Following is an arbitrary selection:

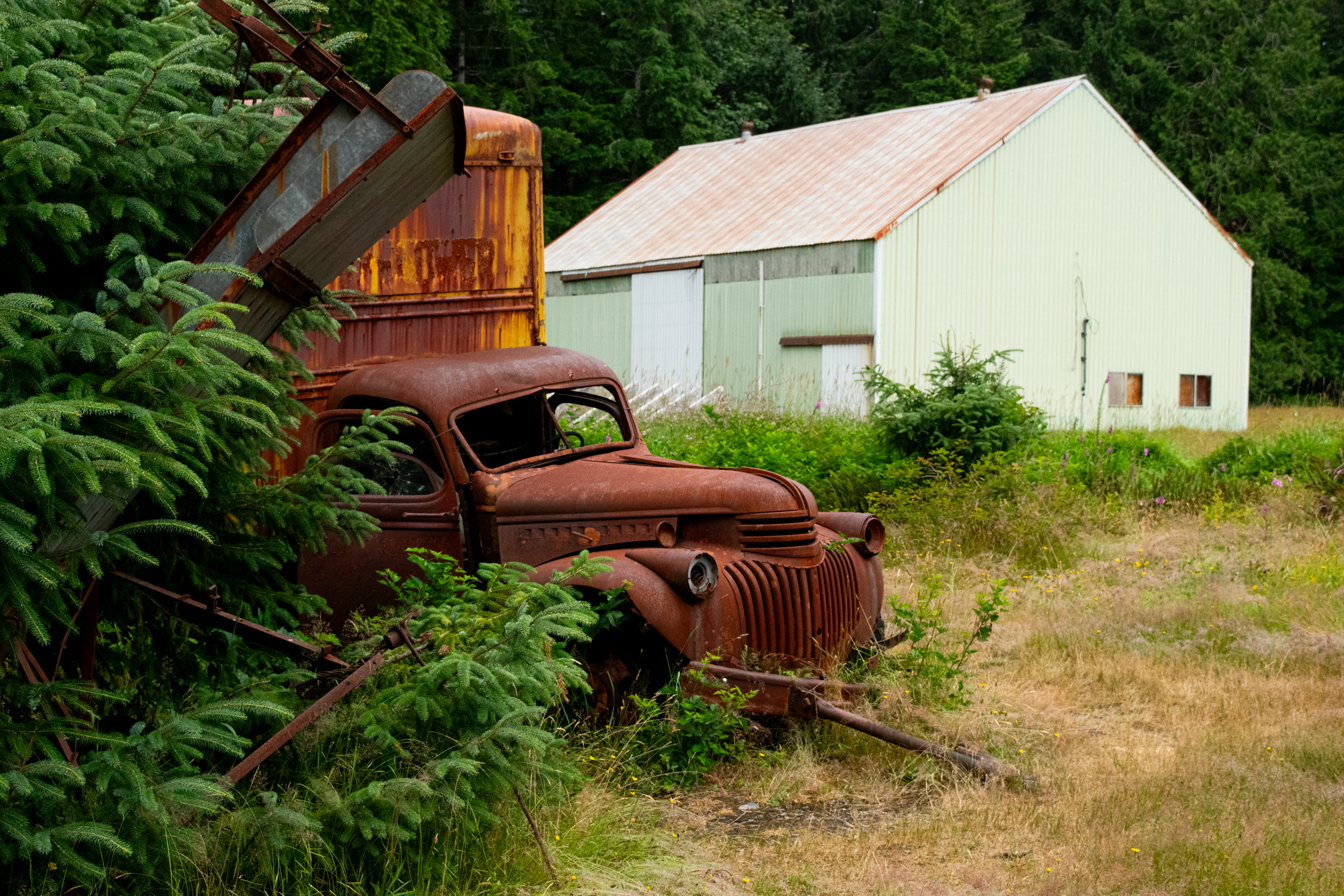
- Decaying Chevrolet truck in Kestner Homestead, Washington
  An abandoned VAZ 2107 (Lada Riva) in Russia
  City of Newcastle: The council classifies a vehicle as being abandoned when the vehicle is parked on a public street and the owner of the vehicle can not be identified. A vehicle may be unregistered and parked on a public street but not necessarily abandoned. Enquiries would be made to identify the owner, establish the reasons as to why the vehicle is parked on the street and the owner can be requested to remove the vehicle.

=== Europe ===
In Europe the amount of abandoned cars vary by region. Europe tends to have stricter rules for cars abandoned. However, there is usually workarounds.

The countryside usually often has people with many cars laying around, however, then we come to the question=are they really abandoned then?

=== Russia ===
Russia also has the same rules for abandoned cars, but enforcement are rarely a priority. As a result, cars can sit untouched for 15+ years, even in centrally in big cities. Russia is one of the countries with most abandoned cars in the world. Here cars can simply be abandoned because the owner found a new vehicle.

== See also ==
- Attractive nuisance doctrine
- Decrepit car
- Getaway car
- Lost, mislaid, and abandoned property
- Vehicle recycling
