= Mapperley Hall =

Country house in Mapperley Park, Nottingham, England

- Location within Nottinghamshire

General information
- Location: 53 Lucknow Avenue, Nottingham, England
- Coordinates: 52.9742°N 1.1432°W
- Completed: 1792
- Client: Wright family of bankers

Design and construction
- Designations: Grade II listed building

Mapperley Hall is a country house located at 51 Lucknow Avenue in the Mapperley Park conservation area of Nottingham, England. Built by Ichabod Wright in 1792, it was the home of the Wright family of bankers until the end of the nineteenth century. From about 1900 the building was used as part of the University College Nottingham, the Principal being Professor Amos Henderson, who died in 1922. It was later used for offices and became a Grade II listed building on 12 July 1972. The road to the north of the property is named Mapperley Hall Drive.

== Background ==
The first occupants were Ichabod Wright II (1767–1862) and his wife Harriet Maria Day (d.1843). Ichabod Wright was a banker, like his father Thomas, in the family bank founded by his grandfather Ichabod Wright I (1700–1777), a former ironmonger and Baltic merchant, in the Long Row, Nottingham in 1761. The couple had three sons and ten daughters. Their eldest son, Ichabod Charles Wright (born 1795) was born at Mapperley and joined his father in the banking profession in 1825, but being famous for his Italian literary pursuits later; he translated Dante's Divine Comedy in three instalments later in the 1830s.

== Description ==
The inscription on the rainwater head of the hall indicates the hall was built in 1792. According to records the hall was raised and altered in about 1845 and in 1889–90 additions were made by Robert Evans. The square plan building is built in three storeys and features stucco, with ashlar dressings and hipped slate roofs with various coped stacks. The windows mainly have glazing bar sashes and include a Venetian window and 4 reglazed French windows. At the rear, north end of the property, is a square service building with pyramidal roof, linked by a curved corridor.

The paneled door to Mapperley Hall is flanked by plain sashes and is framed by a portico with pilasters. A double flight of stairs leads to the landing. The interior is furnished in 1920's decor with moulded plaster wall panels, Adam style frieze and dentillated cornice.
