= Portrait of Thomas Denman =

Painting by Martin Archer Shee

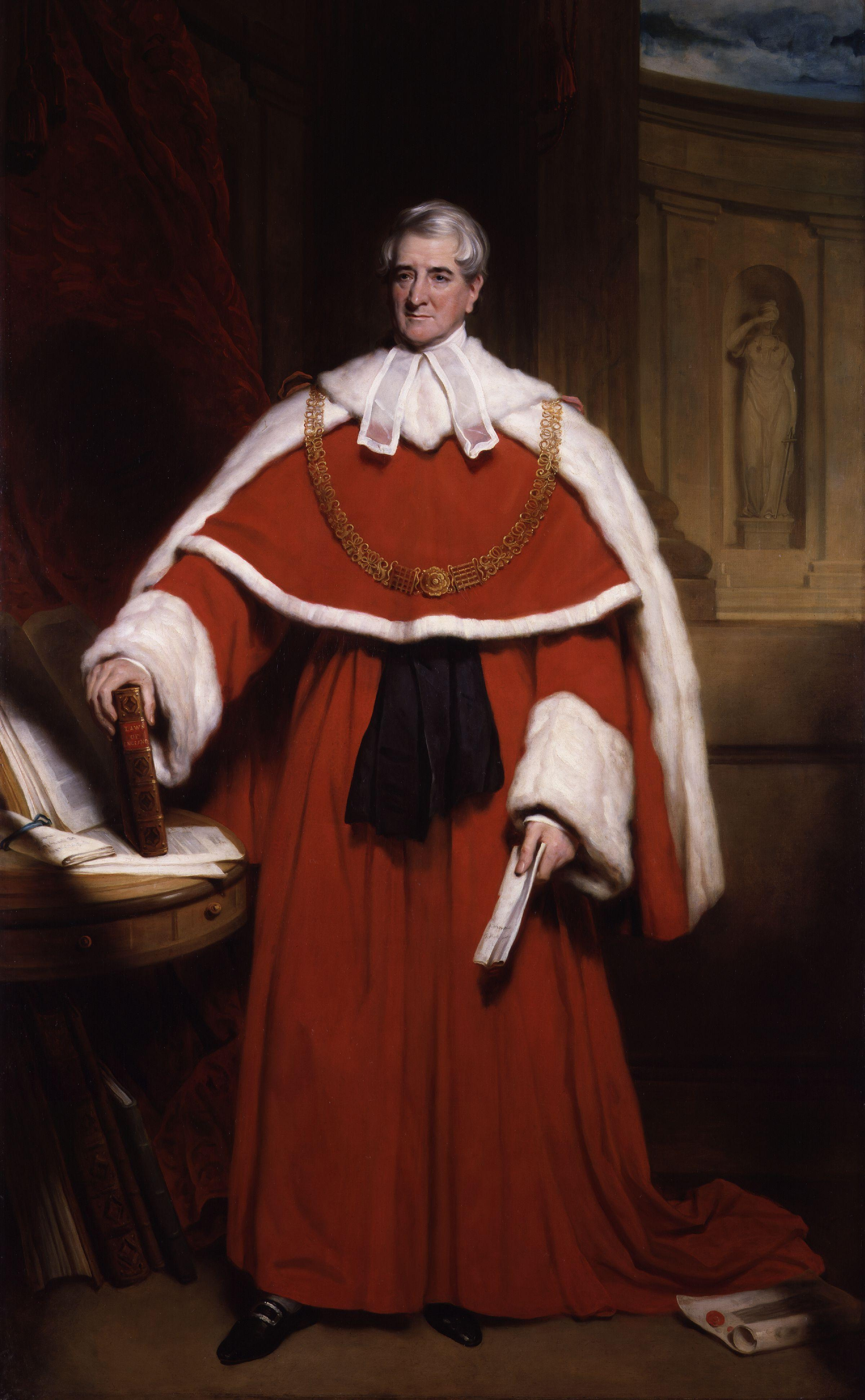
- Artist: Martin Archer Shee
- Year: 1832
- Type: Oil on canvas, portrait painting
- Dimensions: 236.2 cm × 144.8 cm (93.0 in × 57.0 in)
- Location: Royal Courts of Justice, London

Portrait of Thomas Denman is an oil on canvas portrait painting by the Irish artist Martin Archer Shee, from 1832. It is held on loan at the Royal Courts of Justice, in London.

== History and description ==
It depicts the English lawyer, judge and politician Sir Thomas Denman. Denman was known for his support of radical causes and was one of Caroline of Brunswick's counsels during the Trial of Queen Caroline in 1820. A long-standing Whig Member of Parliament he was made Baron Denman in 1834. He is shown at full-length wearing the robes of Lord Chief Justice and holding a copy of William Blackstone's Commentaries on the Laws of England. Behind him as a statue of the blindfolded Jutice.

Archer Shee emerged as a leading portraitist during the Regency era. In 1830 he succeeded Thomas Lawrence as President of the Royal Academy. This painting was commissioned from him by Serjeant's Inn, possibly to commemorate Denman's appointment as Lord Chief Justice. The painting was displayed at the Royal Academy Exhibition of 1833 and again at the Royal Academy Exhibition of 1840. In 1877 it was donated to the National Portrait Gallery. It has been on loan to the Royal Courts of Justice since 1958.

== Bibliography ==
- Moran, Leslie J. Law, Judges and Visual Culture. Routledge, 2020.
- Walker, Richard John Boileau. Regency Portraits, Volume 1. National Portrait Gallery, 1985.
