= Baron Denman =

Title in the Peerage of the United Kingdom

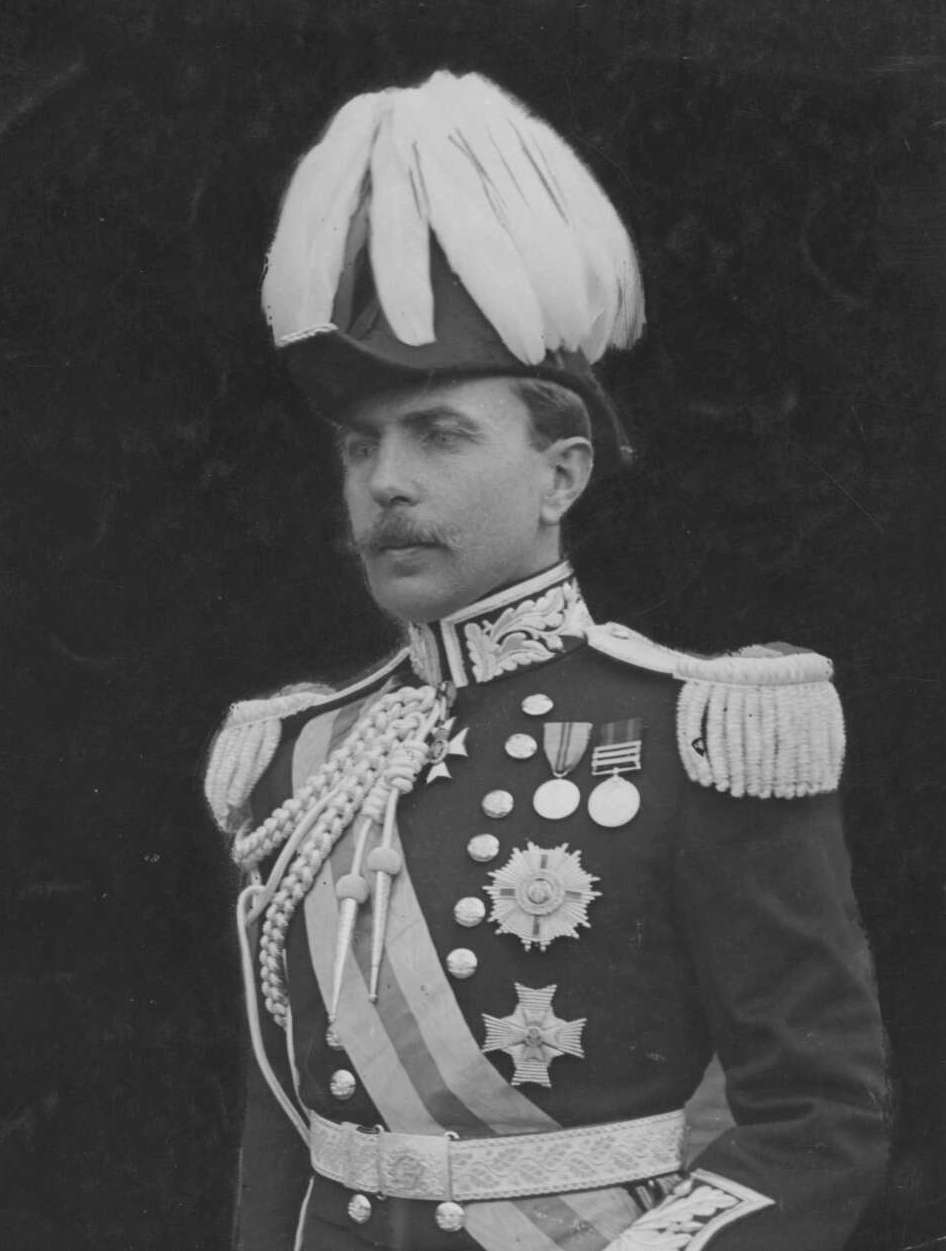
Thomas Denman, 3rd Baron Denman

Baron Denman, of Dovedale in the County of Derby, is a title in the Peerage of the United Kingdom. It was created in 1834 for the prominent lawyer, judge and Whig politician Thomas Denman. He served as Lord Chief Justice of the King's Bench from 1832 to 1850. His son, the second Baron, assumed in 1876 by royal licence the additional surname of Aitchison, which was that of his father-in-law. He was succeeded by his grandnephew, the third Baron. He was the grandson of the Hon. Richard Denman, younger son of the first Baron. Lord Denman notably served as Governor-General of Australia from 1911 to 1914. He was succeeded by his eldest son, the fourth Baron. On his death in 1971, the title passed to his first cousin, Sir Charles Denman, 2nd Baronet, of Staffield (see below), who became the fifth holder of the title.

The Denman baronetcy, of Staffield in the County Cumberland, was created in the Baronetage of the United Kingdom in 1945 for the Hon. Richard Denman, younger brother of the third Baron Denman. He had represented Carlisle in the House of Commons as a Liberal from January 1910 until 1918 and Leeds Central as Labour from 1929, and National Labour from 1931 to 1945. He was succeeded by his son, the aforementioned second Baronet, who succeeded as fifth Baron Denman in 1971. He had unsuccessfully contested Leeds Central in the 1945 general election for the Conservatives. He was succeeded by his son, who succeeded as sixth Baron Denman in 2012.

== Barons Denman (1834) ==
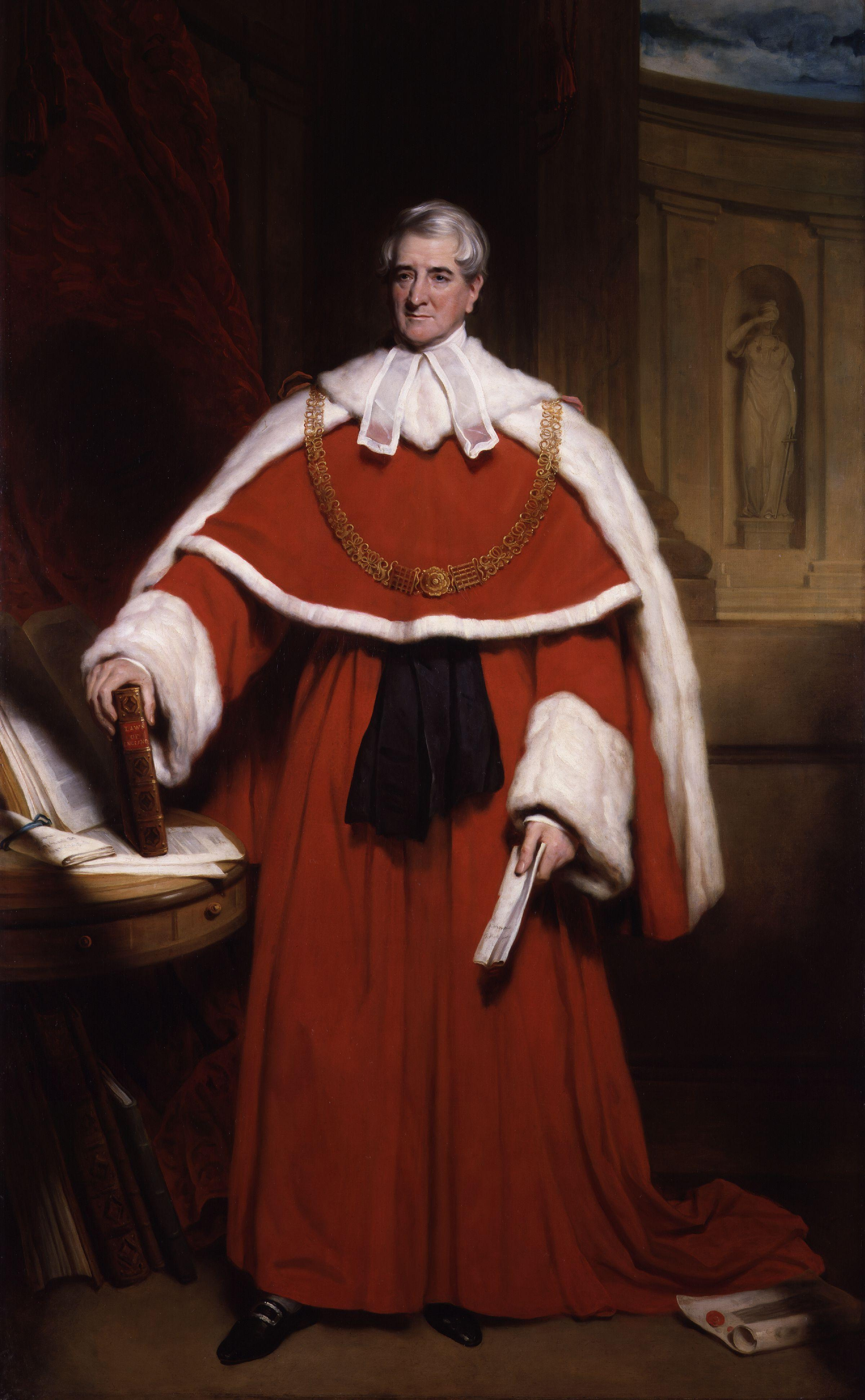
Portrait of Thomas Denman, by Martin Archer Shee, 1832

- Thomas Denman, 1st Baron Denman (1779–1854)
- Thomas Aitchison-Denman, 2nd Baron Denman (1805–1894)
- Thomas Denman, 3rd Baron Denman (1874–1954)
- Thomas Denman, 4th Baron Denman (1905–1971)
- Charles Spencer Denman, 5th Baron Denman (1916–2012)
- Richard Thomas Stewart Denman, 6th Baron Denman (b. 1946)

The heir apparent is the present holder's son, the Hon. Robert Denman (b. 1995).

=== Denman baronets, of Staffield (1945) ===
- Sir Richard Douglas Denman, 1st Baronet (1876–1957)
- Sir Charles Spencer Denman, 2nd Baronet (1916–2012), succeeded as Baron Denman in 1971 (see above for earlier history of this title)

=== Title succession chart ===
Title succession chart, Barons Denman and Denman baronets

Thomas Denman; 1st Baron Denman; 1779–1854
Thomas Aitchison- Denman; 2nd Baron Denman; 1805–1894	V. Adm. Hon. Joseph Denman; 1810–1875	Hon. Richard Denman; 1814–1887
Richard Denman; 1842–1883
Denman baronetcy
Thomas Denman; 3rd Baron Denman; 1874–1954	Sir Richard Denman; 1st Baronet; 1876–1957
Thomas Denman; 4th Baron Denman; 1905–1971	Charles Denman; 5th Baron Denman; 2nd Baronet; 1916–2012
Richard Denman; 6th Baron Denman; 3rd Baronet born 1946
Hon. Robert Denman born 1995

=== Arms ===
Coat of arms of Baron Denman
Crest A raven rising Proper in the beak an annulet Or. Escutcheon Argent on a chevron between three lions' heads erased Gules as many ermine spots Or. Supporters On either side a lion Gules charged on the body with five ermine spots in cross Or. Motto Prudentia Et Constantia
