= Richard Denman =

British politician (1876–1957)

Denman in 1920

The Honourable Sir Richard Douglas Denman, 1st Baronet (24 August 1876 – 22 December 1957), was a radical British Liberal Party politician and Labour Party then National Labour MP.

== Background ==
Denman was the son of Richard Denman, a court clerk and Helen Mary McMicking. Thomas Denman, 1st Baron Denman, Lord Chief Justice of the King's Bench, was his great-grandfather. Thomas Denman, 3rd Baron Denman, Governor-General of Australia, was his elder brother.

== Liberal party ==
In December 1905 he was appointed as Private Secretary to Sydney Buxton the Postmaster General. Denman was elected to the House of Commons for Carlisle as a Liberal in January 1910. In February 1910, when Sydney Buxton was appointed President of the Board of Trade he appointed Denman as his Parliamentary Private Secretary. In 1911 he served as Chairmam of London Juvenile Advisory Committee.

In 1914 when war broke out he joined the Union of Democratic Control, a pressure group of Liberal and Labour politicians who were critical of the Government's war policies. In 1917 he was appointed Parliamentary Private Secretary to Sir Herbert Fisher the President of the Board of Education and to Rowland Prothero the President of the Board of Agriculture and Fisheries in the Coalition government of Lloyd George.

He held Carlisle until he stood down in 1918. He stood unsuccessfully in Newcastle upon Tyne West in 1922, and was defeated again when he stood in Carlisle at the 1923 general election.

== Labour party ==
He joined the Labour Party in 1924 and was elected under that label for Leeds Central at the 1929 General Election.

== National Labour ==
In October 1931 when the Labour party split over support for a National Government, he followed Labour Prime Minister, Ramsay MacDonald into National Labour and was re-elected under this label at the 1931 and 1935 General Elections. He served as the Second Church Estates Commissioner between 1931 and 1943. He retired ahead of the 1945 General Election.

In 1945, Denman was created a Baronet, of Staffield in the County of Cumberland.

== Family ==
Denman married first Helen Sutherland, in 1904; they had separated by 1909. After an annulment, he married May Spencer in 1914, and had a family.

He died in December 1957, aged 81, and was succeeded by his son Charles, who in 1971 also succeeded his cousin as fifth Baron Denman.

== See also ==
- Baron Denman

== Sources ==
- Kidd, Charles, Williamson, David (editors). Debrett's Peerage and Baronetage (1990 edition). New York: St Martin's Press, 1990,
- Craig, F. W. S. (1983) [1969]. British parliamentary election results 1918-1949 (3rd ed.). Chichester: Parliamentary Research Services. ISBN 0-900178-06-X.
- Leigh Rayment's Historical List of MPs

Parliament of the United Kingdom
Preceded by Frederick Chance	Member of Parliament for Carlisle; January 1910 – 1918	Succeeded by Theodore Carr
Preceded by Sir Charles Wilson	Member of Parliament for Leeds Central; 1929–1945	Succeeded by George Porter
Church of England titles
Preceded by George Middleton	Second Church Estates Commissioner; 1931–1943	Succeeded by Sir John Mills
Baronetage of the United Kingdom
New creation	Baronet (of Staffield); 1945–1957	Succeeded by Charles Denman
