= HMS Wanderer (1835) =

Royal Navy brig-sloop

- Wanderer

History

United Kingdom
- Name: HMS Wanderer
- Launched: 10 July 1835
- Completed: 7 Oct 1835
- Out of service: 1850

General characteristics
- Class & type: 16-gun brig-sloop
- Tons burthen: 428
- Sail plan: brig

HMS Wanderer was a 16-gun brig-sloop of the Royal Navy. The ship was part of the West Africa Squadron stationed at Sierra Leone.

In October 1835 HMS Wanderer set sail from Portsmouth for Rio de Janeiro.

In 1839 Joseph Denman was appointed to the command of HMS Wanderer.

In 1842 Stephen Grenville Fremantle, brother of Admiral Charles Fremantle was captain.
