= Charles Denman, 5th Baron Denman =

British Baron and businessman (1916–2012)

The Right Honourable The Lord Denman CBE, MC, TD
- Baron Denman
- Tenure: 1971–2012
- Predecessor: The 4th Baron Denman
- Successor: Richard Denman, 6th Baron Denman
- Other titles: 2nd Baronet of Staffield (1957–2012)
- Born: Charles Spencer Denman; 7 July 1916; Penrith, Cumberland
- Died: 21 November 2012 (aged 96); Highden, West Sussex
- Spouse: Sheila Anne Stewart (m. 1943; died 1987)
- Issue: 3 sons, 1 daughter
- Father: Sir Richard Denman, 1st Baronet
- Mother: May Spencer

Member of the House of Lords
- Lord Temporal
- as a hereditary peer 20 March 1971 – 11 November 1999
- Preceded by: The 4th Baron Denman
- Succeeded by: Seat abolished (Note: Pursuant to the House of Lords Act 1999.)

Personal details
- Party: Conservative

Military service
- Allegiance: United Kingdom
- Branch/service: British Territorial Army
- Unit: Duke of Cornwall's Light Infantry
- Battles/wars: World War II; Battle of Bir el Harmat

Charles Spencer Denman, 5th Baron Denman (7 July 1916 – 21 November 2012), was a British businessman. His interest in the Middle East, formed during the Second World War, was the focus for most of his business endeavours.

== Early life ==
Denman was born on 7 July 1916 in Penrith, Cumberland. He was the eldest son of Sir Richard Denman, 1st Baronet, who sat as Liberal Member of Parliament for Carlisle and then as Labour MP for Leeds. He was educated at Shrewsbury School. He left school at 16 with no qualifications.

Following school, he began working as a gardener in Luton Hoo and then in St Mawes, Cornwall. He then set up a market garden at Mylor, Cornwall.

== Military service ==
Denman joined the Territorial Army in 1936 and served during World War II with the Duke of Cornwall's Light Infantry. He was awarded the Military Cross (MC) on 13 August 1942 'in recognition of gallant and distinguished service in the Middle East'. He attained the rank of Major in 1943 and retired from service in 1945.

== Later career ==
In 1945, Denman unsuccessfully contested in the General Election for the seat of Leeds Central, from which his father had stepped down. A Conservative candidate, he came second in the poll, receiving some 5,000 votes fewer than the eventual winner, Labour's George Porter.

Denman succeeded to his father's baronetcy in 1957 upon his death, and to the Baron Denman title on the death of his first cousin in 1971. He sat as a Conservative peer in the House of Lords until 11 November 1999.

== Personal life ==
Denman married Sheila Anne Stewart, daughter of a Scottish colonel, in September 1943, at Cairo Cathedral. Together, they had one daughter and three sons. Lady Sheila died in 1987 and their eldest daughter Gillian died in 1999.

He was chair of the Saudi-British Society for many years as well as a trustee of Medical Aid for Palestinians.

Denman died in Highden, West Sussex, aged 96 on 21 November 2012. His titles were succeeded by his eldest son, Richard.

== Honours and decorations ==
He was appointed Commander of the Order of the British Empire (CBE) in the New Year Honours of 1976. He was appointed Knight Commander of the Royal Order of Francis I in 2004.

Coat of arms of Charles Denman, 5th Baron Denman
| Crest A raven rising Proper in the beak an annulet Or. Escutcheon Argent on a chevron between three lions' heads erased Gules as many ermine spots Or. Supporters On either side a lion Gules charged on the body with five ermine spots in cross Or. Motto Prudentia Et Constantia |

== Notes ==
Peerage of the United Kingdom
| Preceded by Thomas Denman | Baron Denman; 1971–2012; Member of the House of Lords (1971–1999) | Succeeded by Richard Denman |
Baronetage of the United Kingdom
| Preceded by Richard Denman | Baronet of Staffield; 1957–2012 | Succeeded by Richard Denman |
