= Harry Denman =

Harry Denman was a noted Methodism lay leader and evangelist within the Methodist Church who emphasized the life taught by Jesus at the Sermon on the Mount. Denman strongly challenged modern materialism and prejudice by exemplifying and teaching a simple life, and by personally relating to all people, regardless of race, gender, or economic means. His personal property was very limited; for example he usually had only one pair of shoes and refused to wear a watch, preferring to ask for the time as a way of starting a conversation. Articles that were given to him were generally given away to the needy. He was a close friend of another well-known evangelist, Billy Graham who called Denman "one of the great mentors for evangelism."

He was born September 26, 1893, in Birmingham, Alabama, of Hattie Leonard and William Harry Denman, who immigrated from Gloucestershire, England. He earned a bachelor's degree from Birmingham-Southern College in 1921, and a master's degree in social work in 1930. In 1936 he received an honorary doctorate from Athens State University in Alabama. In 1915, Denman became secretary of the Birmingham Sunday School Association, a post which he held until 1919, when he became church manager of the First Methodist Church in Birmingham.

In 1938 he was elected secretary for the Department of Evangelism in the Board of Missions of the Methodist Episcopal Church, South. Then, in 1939, he became the General Secretary of the Commission on Evangelism, later known as the General Board of Evangelism, of the newly formed The Methodist Church. As the general secretary, he also had responsibility for the publication of The Upper Room, a devotional publication. He was also a member of the Jurisdictional Conferences in 1940, 1944, 1948, and 1952.

On January 31, 1949, Denman was among a group of nine dedicated Methodists whose desire to directly support evangelism ministry in the church led them to incorporate The Foundation for Evangelism. Denman was also instrumental in establishing the International Prayer Fellowship. This organization was headquartered in Lake Junaluska, North Carolina, where a prayer chapel dedicated to Denman still exists in the historic Lambuth Inn.

In 1965, Denman retired from The General Board of Evangelism. He accepted his final salary from the General Board and donated it to The Foundation for Evangelism. He then traveled extensively in the United States and throughout the world to preach and conduct evangelistic meetings. He died November 8, 1976, in Birmingham, Alabama, at the age of 83.
