= William Eusebius Andrews =

English journalist

William Eusebius Andrews (6 December 1773 – 7 April 1837) was an English journalist and editor who created a number of Catholic newspapers.

== Early life ==
He was born at Norwich, England, 6 December 1773; died London, 7 April 1837. His parents were Catholic converts.

== Career ==
He entered the printing office of the Norfolk Chronicle as an apprentice. He rose to be editor of the paper, a post he held from 1799 to 1813. In 1813 he went to London to devote himself to advancing the Catholic cause by means of the press, and in July of that year he established the Orthodox Journal and Catholic Monthly Intelligencer. He was materially aided by Bishop John Milner, but in 1820 he was obliged to suspend publication.

During this period he began the publication in Glasgow of a weekly pamphlet, The Catholic Vindicator, but its losses compelled him to abandon it after one year. With the assistance of Bishop Milner, he established in December 1820, a weekly newspaper, The Catholic Advocate of Civil and Religious Liberty, which was discontinued nine months later. In January 1822, two periodicals were established, one, The Catholic Miscellany, devoted to Catholic interests, with a nominal editor, but under the control of Andrews; the other, The People's Advocate, exclusively political, under his avowed editorship. The Advocate lived only seven weeks, and after two months the sole editorship of the other devolved on Andrews. He continued it for several months. In September 1824, he established a weekly paper, The Truth Teller, which lasted for twelve months, and was afterwards continued as a pamphlet, but finally discontinued in 1829 through lack of support. The Truth Teller was noted for the vigour with which it assailed Daniel O'Connell.

On 2 April 1825, across the Atlantic, The Truth Teller began publication, as New York's first distinctly Catholic paper. There is no direct information extant as to whether the idea was to have it as a sort of local edition of the London publication. The first six issues, however, do bear the imprint of "William E. Andrews & Co." as the publishers. Then the name of the publishing firm is changed to George Pardow and William Denman, without any reason being assigned. George Pardow was an English Catholic and so was Denman, both having emigrated to New York a few years before. In the early issues of the New York Truth Teller there are constant references to the work of Andrews in London, showing an intimate relationship, but never, however, giving any positive statement as to a business connection.

Andrews again revived the Orthodox Journal, which he subsequently continued as The British Liberator, and later as Andrews's Constitutional Preceptor. From 1832 to 1834, he issued as a weekly paper, Andrews's Penny Orthodox Journal, which after three months became The London and Dublin Orthodox Journal. It was continued after his death by his son.

In 1826 Andrews had established a society known as "The Friends of Civil and Religious Liberty", which in a little more than a year distributed nearly 500,000 tracts. This society was the parent of the "Metropolitan Tract Society" and many similar organizations.

== Works ==
In addition to his work as editor, Andrews wrote:

- "The Catholic School Book" (1814);
- "The Historical Narrative of the Horrid Plot and Conspiracy of Titus Oates" (1816);
- "The Ashton Controversy", eighteen pamphlets (1822–23);
- "A Critical and Historical Review of Fox's Book of Martyrs" (3 vols., 1824–46);
- An abridgement of Francis Plowden's History of Ireland;
- "The Catholic Vade Mecum";
- "Popery Triumphant" (a satirical pamphlet);
- "The Two Systems";
- He edited "The End of Religious Controversy", by Milner (1818).
