= Herbert Denman =

American painter

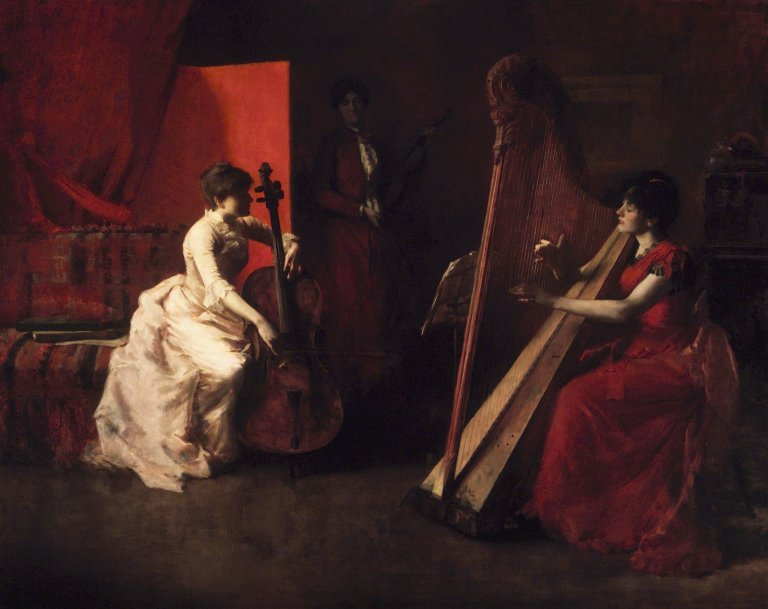
The Trio by Herbert Denman

Herbert Denman (born in Brooklyn, N. Y., June 20, 1855 - died 1903 in Idyllwild, California) was a figure-painter.

Born to a wealthy family, Denman was a pupil of Art Students League of New York, and Carolus Duran, Paris; honorable mention, Paris Salon, 1886, and Paris Exposition, 1889; member Society of American Artists 1887.

His work, which is somewhat decorative in character, was described by contemporaries as marked by good qualities of color and drawing.

The Trio was considered to be one of the best of his works, and was exhibited at the Paris Salon of 1886. It represented three young women with musical instruments. His studio was in New York City.
