= Thomas Denman, 3rd Baron Denman =

British politician (1874–1954)

The Right Honourable The Lord Denman GCMG, KCVO, PC
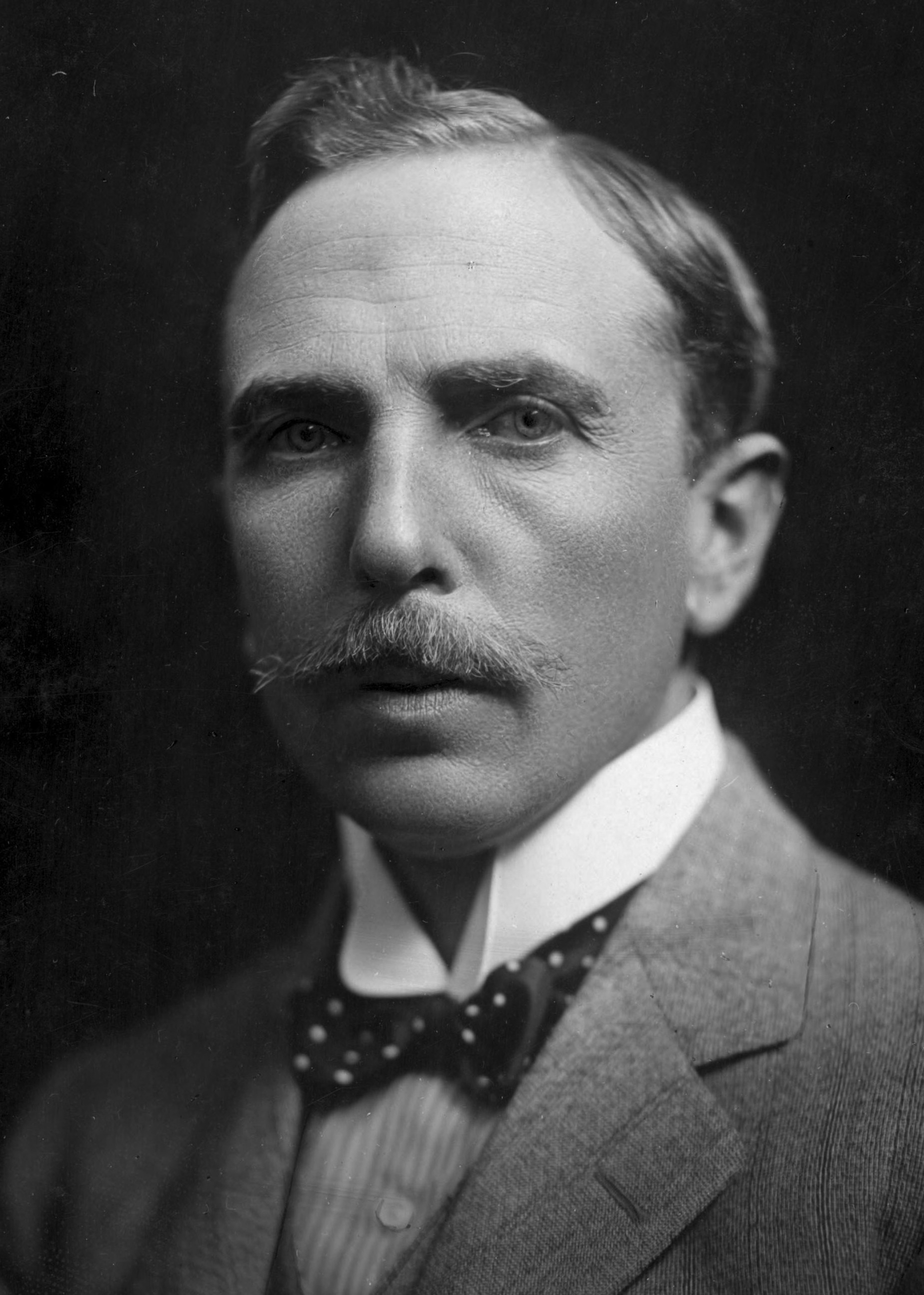
- Denman c. 1910s

5th Governor-General of Australia
- In office 31 July 1911 – 18 May 1914
- Monarch: George V
- Prime Minister: Andrew Fisher; Joseph Cook
- Preceded by: Lord Dudley
- Succeeded by: Sir Ronald Munro Ferguson

Personal details
- Born: 16 November 1874 London, England
- Died: 24 June 1954 (aged 79) Hove, Sussex, England
- Spouse: Gertrude Pearson (m. 1903; died 1954)

Thomas Denman, 3rd Baron Denman (16 November 1874 – 24 June 1954) was a British aristocrat and politician who served as the fifth governor-general of Australia, in office from 1911 to 1914.

Denman was born into the English nobility, inheriting his title at the age of 19 from a great-uncle. He attended the Royal Military College, Sandhurst, and served in the Second Boer War. Denman sat with the Liberal Party in the House of Lords, and was made a Lord-in-waiting in 1905 and Chief Whip in 1907. He was appointed to the governor-generalship at the age of 36, and remains the youngest person to have held the position. Denman and his young family were immensely popular with the general public, and he enjoyed friendly relations with Prime Minister Andrew Fisher, with whom he shared many similar political opinions. However, he suffered from ill health and returned to England after less than three years as governor-general. Denman never again held public office, but remained active in the House of Lords and briefly commanded a unit in the First World War.

== Early life and military career ==
Denman was born in London on 16 November 1874, the son of Richard Denman and the former Helen Mary McMicking. His father was the grandson of Thomas Denman, 1st Baron Denman, who was Lord Chief Justice from 1832 to 1850. Denman was the second of three children, and the oldest son. His younger brother, Sir Richard Denman, was also a Liberal Party politician.

Denman's parents divorced in 1878. His father did not remarry, and died in 1883 when his son was eight. However, his mother remarried twice – in 1879 to James Walker (annulled due to desertion), and then in 1888 to Henry Primrose (a civil servant and cousin of Lord Rosebery).

In 1894, aged 19, Denman succeeded his great-uncle as Baron Denman; he took his seat in the House of Lords on his 21st birthday. He intended a military career and was a graduate of the Royal Military College, Sandhurst. Denman began his career in the Royal Scots, where he was promoted to lieutenant on 4 March 1896, but resigned in May 1899 and was placed in the Reserve. Returning to active service following the outbreak of the Second Boer War, he was on 3 February 1900 commissioned as a lieutenant of the 11th Battalion, Imperial Yeomanry, and left Liverpool for South Africa on the SS Cymric in March 1900. He was promoted to captain in the battalion on 18 July 1900, and the following year was appointed a captain in the Middlesex (Duke of Cambridge's Hussars) Imperial Yeomanry, followed by a promotion to major on 30 April 1902.

== Politics ==
Denman had little money until 1903, when he married Gertrude Pearson, daughter of the wealthy industrialist Weetman Pearson (later Viscount Cowdray). He was then able to devote his time to public life and served in the Liberal administrations of Sir Henry Campbell-Bannerman and H. H. Asquith as a Lord-in-waiting (government whip in the House of Lords) from 1905 to 1907 and as Captain of the Honourable Corps of Gentlemen-at-Arms (government chief whip in the House of Lords) between 1907 and 1911. He was sworn of the Privy Council in 1907. In 1909, he was appointed to the Royal Victorian Order as a Knight Commander. In 1911, Lord Harcourt, the Colonial Secretary, offered Denman the post of Governor-General of Australia, apparently to get him out of domestic politics. In the 1911 Coronation Honours, Lord Denman was appointed to the Order of St Michael and St George as a Knight Grand Cross.

== Governor-General ==
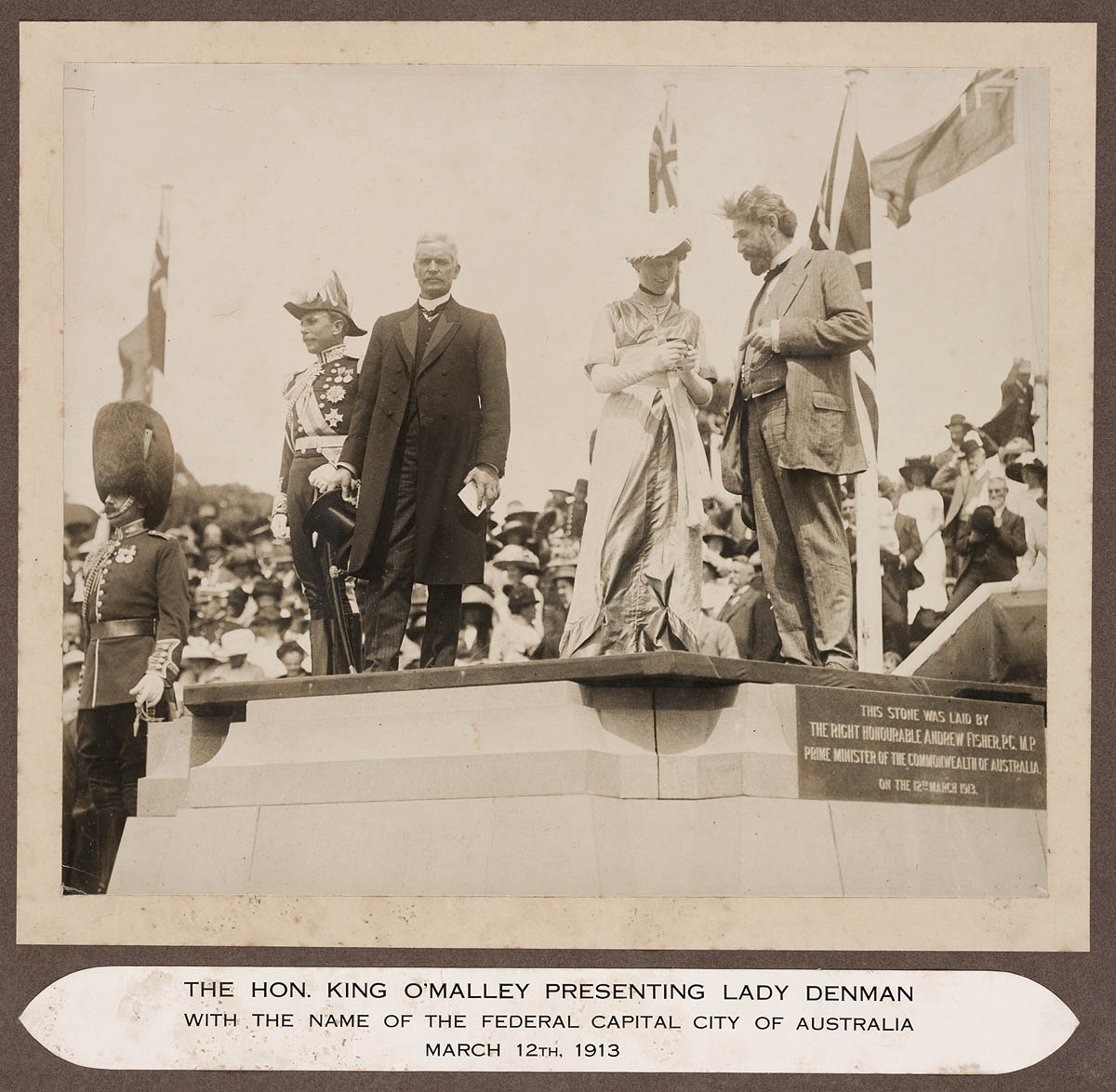
Denman, to the left of Labor Prime Minister Andrew Fisher, at the naming of Canberra in 1913.

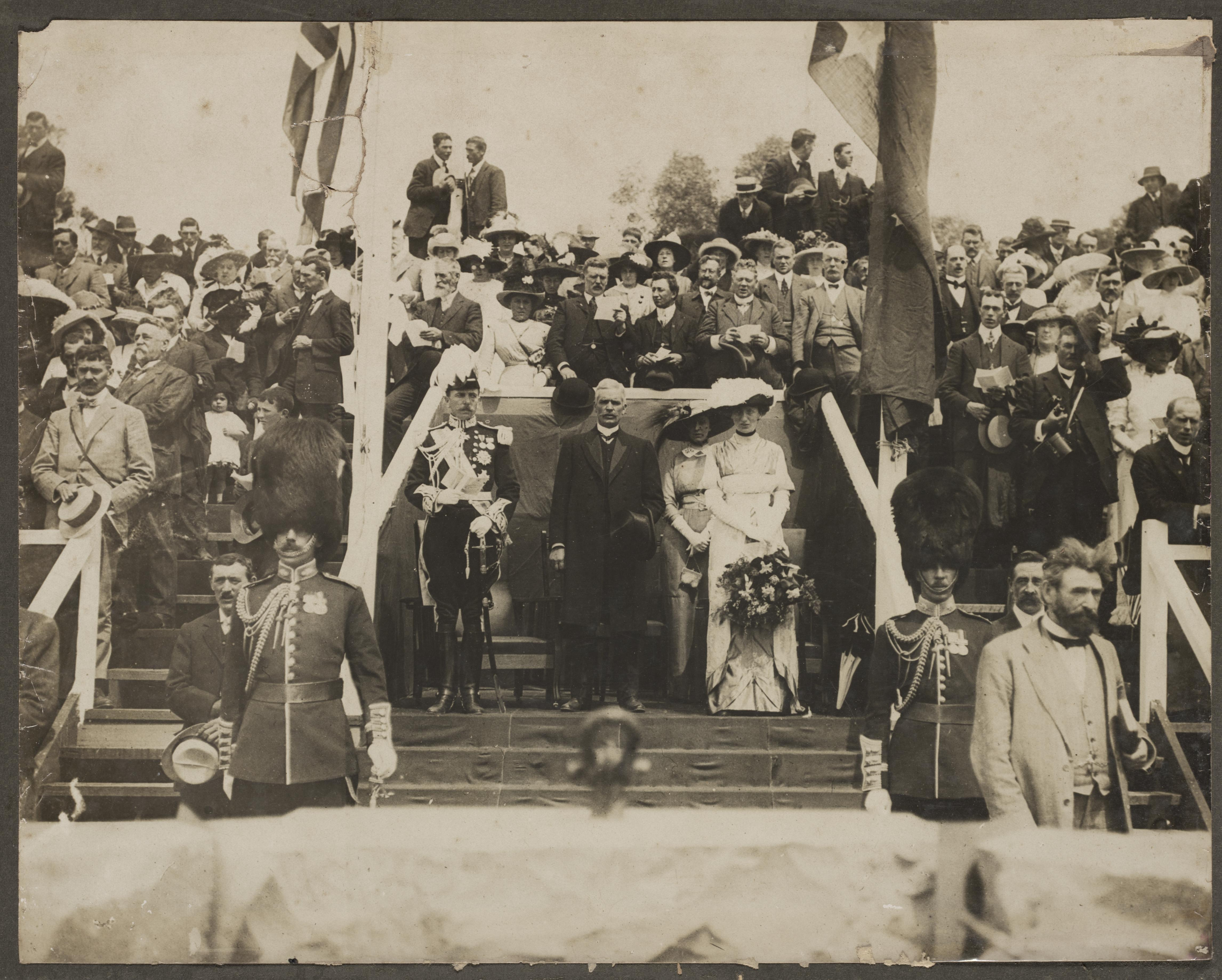
Lord and Lady Denman, King O'Malley and Andrew Fisher at the official ceremony on Capitol Hill to mark the commencement of work on the city of Canberra, 12 March 1913

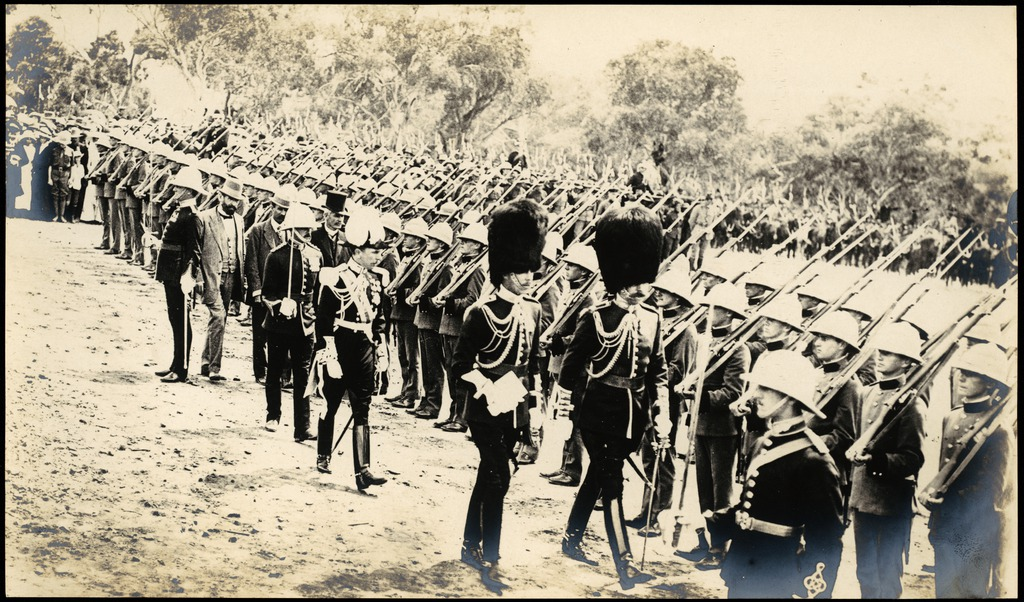
The cadets being inspected by the Governor-General on 12 March 1913, at the Canberra naming ceremony

The Denmans arrived in Melbourne on 31 July 1911. They found Andrew Fisher's Labor government firmly in control. As the most politically liberal Governor-General yet appointed, he got on well with the Labor ministers, and his modesty and generosity with his father-in-law's money made him popular with the public. In October 1912, the New South Wales Premier, James McGowen "evicted" him from Government House, Sydney. On 12 March 1913, he inaugurated the site of the future national capital and Lady Denman formally announced its name, Canberra. On 12 March 2013, his great-nephew, the 6th Baron Denman and his wife attended celebrations in Canberra commemorating the centenary of the naming of the city.

But Denman found that he had less real political influence than any previous Governor-General. As Australia, along with the other dominions, achieved political maturity, its Prime Minister communicated directly with his British counterpart, cutting the Colonial Secretary and the Governor-General out of the loop. The appointment of an Australian High Commissioner in London further reduced the Governor-General's diplomatic role.

In May 1913 the Labor government was unexpectedly defeated at a general election by Joseph Cook's Liberals. But Labor retained control of the Senate and was determined to frustrate Cook's government at every turn. By early 1914 it was clear that a constitutional crisis was developing. Denman was in poor health—that he was allergic to Australia's national flower, the wattle, did not help—and his marriage was suffering from his wife's unhappiness at being so far from home. He felt he lacked the strength to deal with the political situation, and in May 1914 he resigned.

The Denman Glacier in eastern Antarctica was named after Denman by Sir Douglas Mawson. It had been discovered by the Australasian Antarctic Expedition of 1911–14.

== Later years ==
With the outbreak of the Great War, Denman commanded the 1st County of London Yeomanry (Middlesex, Duke of Cambridge's Hussars) from 1914 until 1915. He held the appointment of honorary colonel of the successor unit, the 2nd Cavalry Divisional Signals (Middlesex Yeomanry), from 11 April 1923 to 13 July 1934. He remained loyal to Asquith and the Liberals and so did not hold office again, leading a quiet life until his death in Hove, Sussex, 22 days after that of his wife. He was succeeded in the barony by his son, Thomas Denman, 4th Baron Denman.

== Arms ==
Coat of arms of Thomas Denman, 3rd Baron Denman
Crest A raven rising proper, in the beak an annulet or. Escutcheon Argent, on a chevron between three lions' heads erased gules, as many ermine spots or. Supporters On either side a lion gules, charged on the body with five ermine spots in cross or. Motto Prudentia Et Constantia (By prudence and constancy) Other versions Full achievements:

== Notes ==
Political offices
Preceded by The Viscount Churchill	Lord-in-waiting; 1905–1907	Succeeded by The Lord Herschell
Preceded by The Earl Beauchamp	Captain of the Gentlemen-at-Arms; 1907–1911	Succeeded by The Lord Colebrooke
Preceded by The Lord Ribblesdale	Government Chief Whip in the House of Lords; 1907–1911	Succeeded by The Lord Colebrooke
Government offices
Preceded by The Earl of Dudley	Governor-General of Australia; 1911–1914	Succeeded by Sir Ronald Munro Ferguson
Peerage of the United Kingdom
Preceded by Thomas Aitchison-Denman	Baron Denman; 1894–1954	Succeeded by Thomas Denman
