= William Denman (publisher) =

William Denman (17 March 1784 in Edinburgh, Scotland – 12 September 1870 in Brooklyn, New York) was a Scottish-American publisher.

== Life ==
His father was a German, his mother an Alsatian, and he claimed to have been in the English army before he emigrated to New York in 1824. He was an associate of William Eusebius Andrews, the London publisher, and after settling down in New York, he began, in conjunction with George Pardow, on 2 April 1825, the publication of The Truth Teller, the first Roman Catholic newspaper issued there.

It was a weekly, and for a time enjoyed considerable local influence which gave Denman political prominence. Its support of trusteeism lost it the support of the local ecclesiastical authorities, rival publications were started and its prestige waned until he sold the paper 31 March 1855, to the proprietors of The Irish American, who merged it in that journal a short time after.

== Family ==
Three of his sons were in the United States service: Adjutant Frederic J. Denman, of the Artillery, killed by accident in Texas in 1854; Ensign Joseph A. Denman, of the Navy, died 1862; Colonel Charles L. Denman, who served in the Mexican War and as consul in South America, died 17 March 1893. The youngest son, William, was for some years editor of the New York Tablet.
