= George Anson Primrose =

Vice-Admiral George Anson Primrose (1849–1930) was a senior British naval officer.

== Life ==
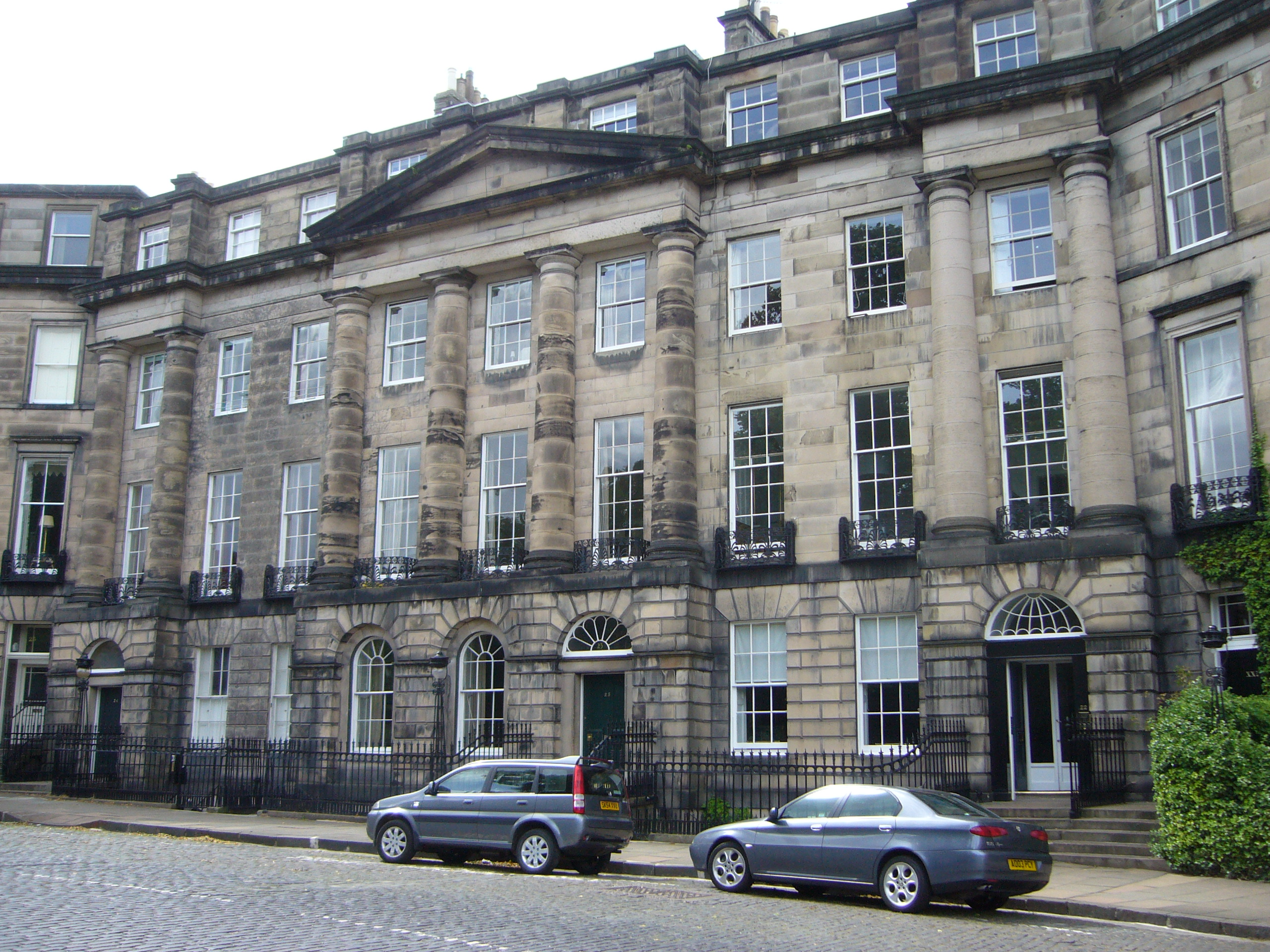
22 Moray Place

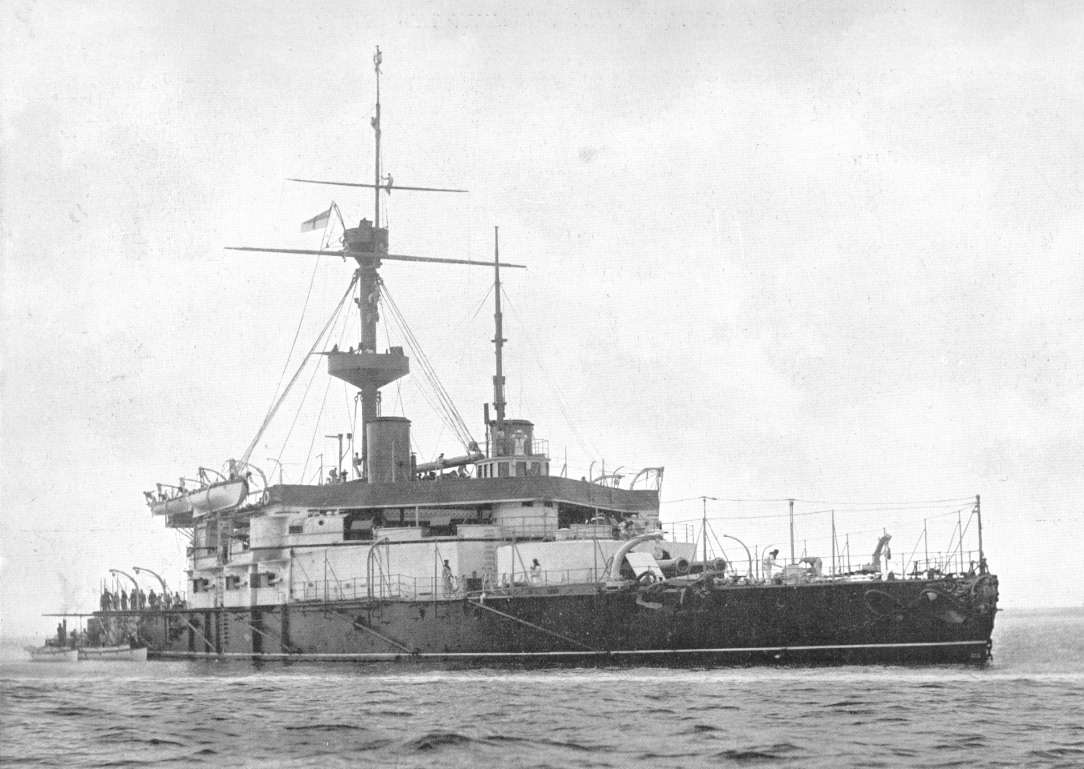
HMS Trafalgar

He was born at 22 Moray Place in Edinburgh on 21 September 1849, the son of the Hon Bouverie Francis Primrose and his wife Frederica Sophia Anson, daughter of Thomas Anson, 1st Viscount Anson.

He entered the Royal Navy in March 1863 aged 13; by September 1873 he had reached the rank of Lieutenant. In March 1887 he became Acting Captain of HMS Pylades for just under two months. In 1890 he was appointed to the training ship Boscawen where he served until promoted to Captain in 1892. In 1893 he commanded HMS Apollo during the annual manoeuvres, before being appointed in command of the royal yacht Osborne in October 1893. In 1896 he was given command of the Indefatigable, briefly commanded the Talbot in 1899, before taking command of the battleship Trafalgar at the end of the year. In September 1902 he transferred again to HMS Royal Sovereign but stayed only a few months before being superseded in December. He retired in December 1903, being too old to reach flag rank before the compulsory retirement age of 55.

Whilst on the Retired List he was promoted to rear admiral in 1904 and vice admiral in 1908.

He died at St George's Lodge in Surrey on 6 January 1930 due to an intestinal obstruction.

== Family ==
In 1889 he married Mary Cecilia Kenny, daughter of Thomas Edward Kenny of Nova Scotia. They had two daughters.
