= Thomas Denman (physician) =

English physician

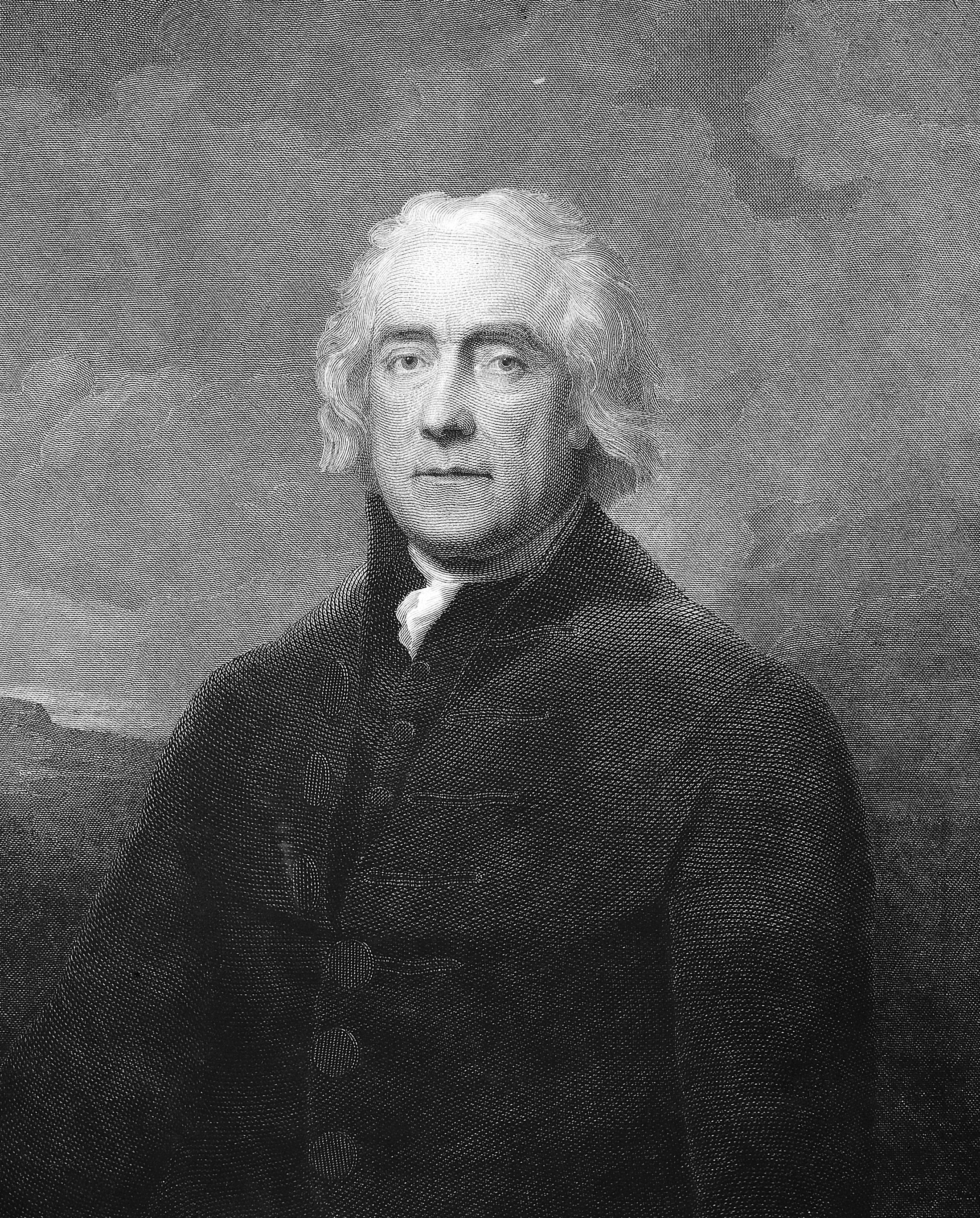
- Denman by William Skelton
- Born: 27 June 1733; Bakewell, England, Great Britain
- Died: 26 November 1815 (aged 82); London, England, British Empire
- Burial place: St James's Church, England, United Kingdom
- Education: Bakewell grammar school
- Occupation: Physician
- Children: Thomas and 2 daughters
- Parent: John

Thomas Denman, the elder, M.D. (27 June 1733 – 26 November 1815) was an English physician. He was the second son of John Denman (or Thomas), an apothecary. After a career in naval medicine he made a considerable amount of money in midwifery. The phenomenon of Denman's spontaneous evolution, by which a spontaneous impaction of the shoulder of a foetus resolves a difficult transverse delivery during childbirth, is named after him. He used his authority to support inducing premature labour in cases of narrow pelvis and other conditions in England (where the mother's life is imperiled by delivery at the full-time).

== Biography ==
Denman was educated at Lady Manners School. He came to London in 1753, and began to study medicine at St George's Hospital. He entered the medical service of the Royal Navy as a surgeon's mate, and in 1757 became a surgeon. Attached, till 1763, to the ship HMS Edgar, when, on the conclusion of peace, he left the service. He then continued his medical studies, and attended the lectures on midwifery of Dr. William Smellie, one of the best observers and most original writers on this field of medical study, and to whose instruction the future distinction of Denman was in part due. He graduated from medical training at Aberdeen 13 July 1764, and began practice as a physician at Winchester. He got so little to do that he returned to London and tried to re-enter the navy, but failed to get an appointment. He obtained, however, the post of surgeon to a royal yacht, the duties of which did not often take him away from London, while the retainer of £70 a year was an important addition to his income. He lectured on midwifery, and continued to do so for fifteen years. In 1769, he was elected physician accoucheur to the Middlesex Hospital, and held the post till his large practice forced him to give it up in 1783. In that year he was admitted a licentiate in mid-wifery of the College of Physicians.

In 1791, having accumulated a considerable fortune, he bought a country house at Feltham in Middlesex. He never gave up practice altogether, but limited it to consultations.

He was the first physician whose authority made the practice general in England of inducing premature labour in cases of narrow pelvis and other conditions, in which the mother's life is imperilled by the attempt to deliver at the full-time.

There are three volumes of the Diaries of John Knyveton edited by Ernest Gray, published between 1937 and 1946, that are clearly based on the life of Thomas Denman, although they do not state this. The first volume has inaccuracies with regards to dates for some events but a quick analysis of the two later volumes reveals that Denman and Knyveton are the same person. Although some of the dates are incorrect, there are fewer inaccuracies than in the first volume.

== Family ==
Denman died at his town house in Mount Street, London, 26 November 1815, and was buried in the St. James' Church in Piccadilly. Thomas had an elder brother who was also a doctor and published a book called Treatise on Buxton Water: he married an heiress. When he died, he left his wealth to Thomas' son. His eldest son, Thomas Denman the younger, became Chief justice of England, while one of his two daughters married Dr. Matthew Baillie, the pathologist, and the other married Sir Richard Croft, M.D. Croft was trained by Denman, and committed suicide in 1817 after losing a princess' child.

== Major publications ==
- A Letter to Dr. Richard Huck on the Construction and Method of using Vapour Baths, London, 1768.
- Essays on the Puerperal Fever and on Puerperal Convulsions, 1768
- An Introduction to the Practice of Midwifery, 1762 which reached a fifth edition in 1805. After his death a sixth (1824) and a seventh edition (1832) were published. These include a biographical sketch: partly autobiography memoir with a posthumous biographical addition, probably written by his son-in-law Dr Baillie and his daughter Mrs Sophia Baillie.
- Aphorisms on the Application and Use of the Forceps and Vectis on Preternatural Labours, on Labours attended with Hemorrhage and with Convulsions, 1783. It has had seven English and three American editions, and was translated into French.
- On Uterine Hemorrhages depending on Pregnancy and Parturition, 1786
- On Preternatural Labours, 1786
- On Natural Labours; 1786
- A Collection of Engravings to illustrate the Generation and Parturition of Animals and of the Human Species. 1787
- On the Snuffles in Infants in the Medical Journal, 1790. This is the first accurate description of the nasal and laryngeal catarrh of congenital infantile syphilis.
- Observations on Rupture of the Uterus,
- On the Snuffles in Infants
- On Mania Lactea, 1810
- Plates of Polypi of the Uterus, 1800
- Observations on the Cure of Cancers, 1810.
