= Joseph Denman =

Vice-Admiral The Honourable Joseph Denman
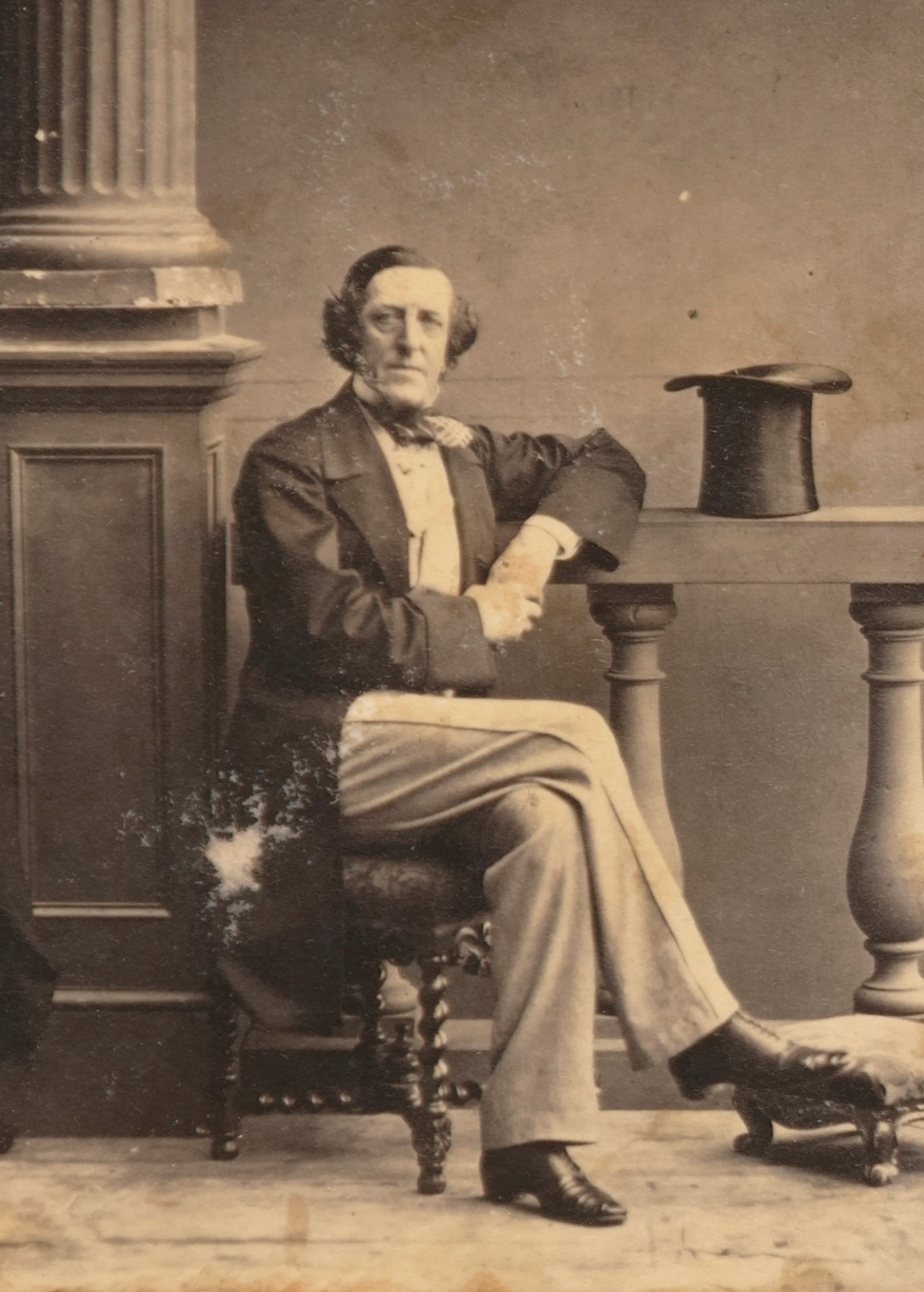
- Portrait by Camille Silvy, 1860
- Born: 23 June 1810
- Died: 26 November 1874 (aged 64)
- Military career
- Allegiance: United Kingdom
- Branch: Royal Navy
- Service years: 1823 - 1866
- Rank: Vice-Admiral
- Commands: HMS Wanderer; Pacific Station

Vice-Admiral Joseph Denman (23 June 1810 – 26 November 1874) was a British naval officer, most noted for his actions against the slave trade as a commander of HMS Wanderer of the West Africa Squadron.

== Early life ==
Denman was born in Bloomsbury on 23 June 1810, the son of Thomas Denman, 1st Baron Denman, Lord Chief Justice and a noted abolitionist.

== Military career ==
Joseph entered the Royal Navy on 7 April 1823, and was promoted to Lieutenant in 1831 and commander in 1835.

In 1834, Lieutenant Joseph Denman commanded a prize crew aboard the captured slave ship Maria da Gloria. He first sailed her to the Anglo-Brazilian Mixed Commission Court at Rio de Janeiro, which declined jurisdiction on the grounds that the ship was Portuguese, not Brazilian. Denman then had to sail back across the Atlantic to the Anglo-Portuguese court in Sierra Leone. Seventy-eight of the 400 or so slaves on board died during the back-and-forth, which also severely debilitated the survivors. Denman later testified before parliament about this voyage, stating that he had "witnessed the most dreadful sufferings that human beings can endure".

On 26 December 1836 Commander the Honourable Joseph Denman commissioned the brig-sloop HMS Scylla for the Lisbon Station. He remained in command of her there until 17 November 1839.

=== Suppressing the slave trade ===
In 1839 Denman took command of the West Africa Squadron's brig-sloop, HMS Wanderer. On 5 April 1840, the Wanderer's boats seized the American slaver Eliza Davidson, which was subsequently condemned in British and Spanish Mixed Commission Court at Sierra Leone. On 12 May, Denman took the Josephina, a Portuguese schooner fitted for the slave trade, as a prize. On 3 June, he took the schooner São Paolo de Loando as prize. On 9 June he took another schooner fitted for the slave trade, the Maria Rosaria. On 3 July he took the Pombinha, out of Havana, and fitted for the slave trade; on 29 December 1842, a prize court awarded Wanderer's crew a tonnage bounty and moiety of proceeds for Pombinha.

In 1840, while negotiating for the release of two Britons, Denman also negotiated a treaty abolishing the slave trade in the territory of the Gallinas, liberating 841 slaves. At the same time, he destroyed the barracoons (large slave-holding depots) on the banks of the river. The Admiralty initially praised his actions and promoted him to Captain in August 1841, and he left Wanderer on 23 August. Lord Palmerston stated, "Taking a wasp’s nest…is more effective than catching the wasps one by one". However, the Spanish slavers sued him personally for damages. By 1842 the Admiralty had banned the anti-slavery squadron's policy of blockading rivers and the destruction of property. For his role in this action, Denman, his crew and others later received a Parliamentary grant, in Denman's case of over £558.

On his return to England, Denman was on half-pay, awaiting the outcome of the court case. He was active, writing a manual for the squadron, called Instructions for the Guidance of Her Majesty’s Naval Officers Employed in the Suppression of the Slave Trade, which was to be issued to every serving officer. Captain Joseph Denman has been described as one of the most successful and passionate officers to serve on the West Africa squadron and he has been credited with improving the efficiency of the squadron more than any other serving officer. In 1848 the court reached a final decision in the case Burón vs. Denman, one of the last cases in English & Welsh law to regard slaves as property or cargo, finding in Denman's favour as he had been operating as an agent of the British state's policy of suppressing the slave trade when he "trespassed to goods" when destroying the barracoon, rather than as an individual, and therefore his actions fell under the Crown act of state doctrine.

== Later life and career ==
Denman ended his career as Rear Admiral in command of the Pacific station from 1864 until his retirement in April 1866. He was promoted to Vice Admiral in retirement. From 1869 he received a Greenwich Hospital Pension. He died on 26 November 1874.

== Family ==
Denman married on 12 February 1844 Grace Watts-Russell, youngest daughter of Jesse Watts-Russell, MP, of Ilam Hall, Staffordshire. She died in London on 18 December 1902. His brother George Denman was a politician and High Court judge.

== Legacy ==
- Denman Island, off the Coast of British Columbia, Canada, is named after him, as is Denman Street in Vancouver.

== See also ==
- O'Byrne, William Richard (1849). "Denman, Joseph" . A Naval Biographical Dictionary . John Murray – via Wikisource.
