= Thomas Denman, 1st Baron Denman =

18th/19th-century British lawyer and politician

The Right Honourable The Lord Denman PC
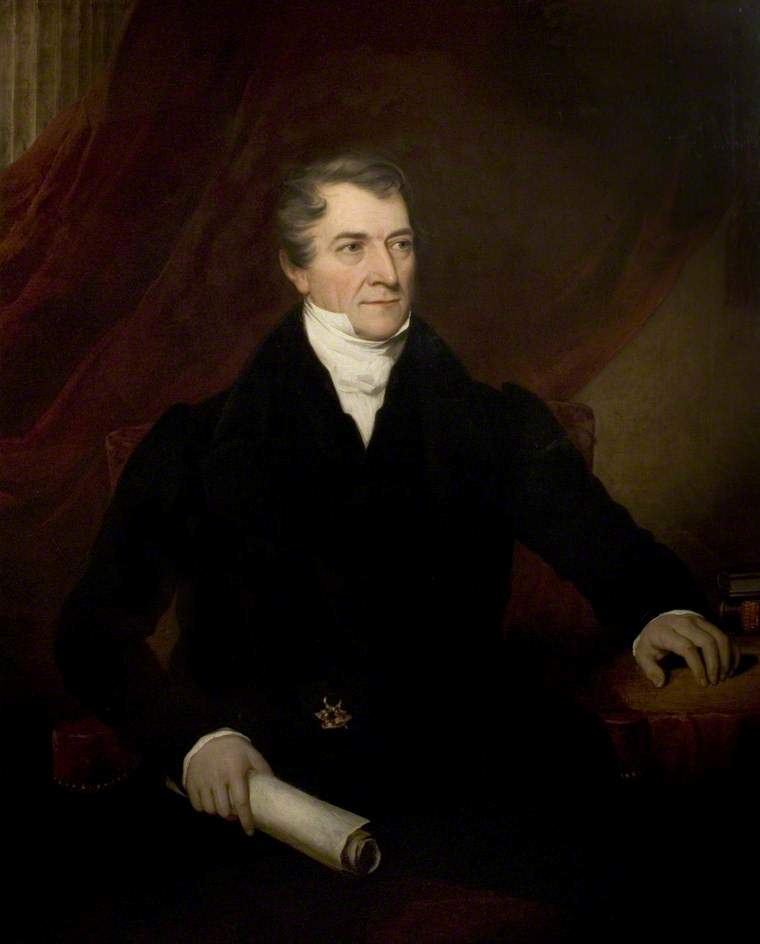
- Painting of Denman c. 1832

Lord Chief Justice of England Lord High Steward for the trial of: List: The Earl Cardigan
- In office 1832–1850
- Monarchs: William IV; Victoria
- Preceded by: The Lord Tenterden
- Succeeded by: The Lord Campbell

Chancellor of the Exchequer Acting
- In office 14 November 1834 – 15 December 1834
- Monarch: William IV
- Prime Minister: The Duke of Wellington (interim)
- Preceded by: Viscount Althorp
- Succeeded by: Sir Robert Peel, Bt

Personal details
- Born: 23 July 1779 London, England, Great Britain
- Died: 26 September 1854 (aged 75) Stoke Albany, Northamptonshire
- Party: Whig
- Spouse: Theodosia Vevers (m. 1804; died 1852)
- Children: Thomas, Theodosia, Joseph, and George
- Parent: Thomas Denman
- Education: St John's College, Cambridge

Thomas Denman, 1st Baron Denman, PC (23 July 1779 – 26 September 1854) was an English lawyer, judge and politician. He served as Lord Chief Justice between 1832 and 1850.

== Background and education ==
Denman was born in London, the son of Thomas Denman. In his fourth year, he attended Palgrave Academy in Suffolk, where his education was supervised by Anna Laetitia Barbauld and her husband. He continued to Eton and St John's College, Cambridge, where he graduated in 1800. In 1806 he was called to the bar at Lincoln's Inn, and at once entered upon practice.

== Legal and judicial career ==
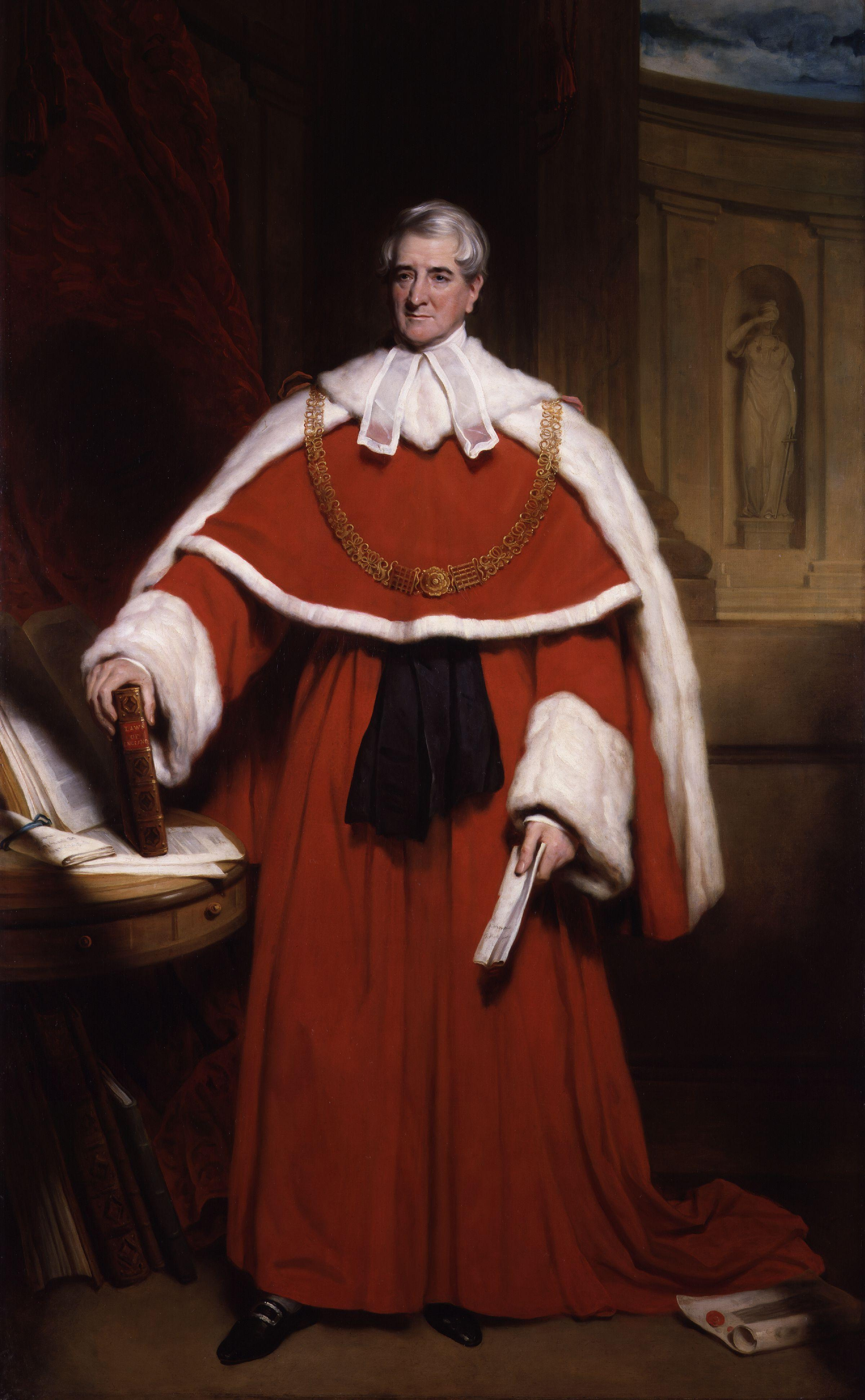
Portrait of Thomas Denman, 1832. Denman as Lord Chief Justice, by Sir Martin Archer Shee

His success was rapid, and in a few years he attained a position at the bar second only to that of Henry Brougham and James Scarlett. He distinguished himself by his defence of the Luddites; but his most brilliant appearance was as one of the counsel for Queen Caroline. His speech before the House of Lords was very powerful, and some competent judges even considered it not inferior to Brougham's. It contained one or two daring passages, which made the King his bitter enemy, and retarded his legal promotion. Unfortunately he made a notable gaffe when he compared the Queen to the Biblical woman taken in adultery, who was told to "go away and sin no more". This suggested that her counsel had no belief in the Queen's innocence, and produced the mocking satire:

"Most Gracious Queen, we thee implore
To go away and sin no more
Or if that effort be too great
To go away at any rate".

At the general election of 1818 he was returned Member of Parliament for Wareham, and at once took his seat with the Whig opposition. In the following year, he was returned for Nottingham, which seat he represented until 1826 and again from 1830 until his elevation to the bench in 1832. His liberal principles had caused his exclusion from office till in 1822 he was appointed Common Serjeant of London by the corporation of London. In 1830 he was made Attorney General under Lord Grey's administration and was knighted on 24 November that year.

Two years later he was made Lord Chief Justice of the King's Bench and was sworn of the Privy Council two days later. In 1834, he was raised to the peerage as Baron Denman, of Dovedale, in the County of Derby. As a judge he is best remembered for his decision in the important privilege case of Stockdale v. Hansard (9 Ad. & El. I.; II Ad. & El. 253). In 1841 he presided, as Lord High Steward, over the trial in the House of Lords of the Earl of Cardigan for attempted murder. In O'Connell v the Queen, in 1844, he led the majority of the Lords in quashing the conviction for sedition of Daniel O'Connell. This is a tribute to his integrity since O'Connell was regarded with aversion by the British ruling class; but Denman, as he made clear, could not accept that he had received a fair trial. In 1850 he resigned from his chief justiceship and retired into private life. He was a governor of the Charter House, and a vice-president of the Corporation of the Sons of the Clergy. He also strove with great energy, both as a writer and as a judge, to effect the abolition of the slave trade.

== Quote ==
Trial by jury, instead of being a security to persons who are accused, shall be a delusion, a mockery, and a snare.

— Lord Denman, O'Connell v The Queen [1844]

== Family ==
Lord Denman married Theodosia Anne, daughter of Reverend Richard Vevers, in 1804. His Derbyshire seat was Middleton Hall, Stoney Middleton. He died at Stoke Albany, Northamptonshire aged 75, and was succeeded in the barony by his oldest son Thomas. His daughter Theodosia (1806–1895) married Ichabod Wright. Frances married Robert Lambert Baynes. Margaret married Henry William, son of Zachary MacAulay. secondly, Edward Cropper, son of James Cropper. thirdly, John Owen, son of Sir Hugh Owen Owen, 2nd Baronet. Caroline married John George de la Poer Beresford, son of Sir John Beresford, 1st Baronet. Another son, Joseph, was a Royal Navy officer, while another, George, was an MP and High Court judge.

== Cases ==
- Williams v. Carwardine (1833) 4 B. & Ad. 621
- Stockdale v. Hansard 9 Ad. & El. I.; II Ad. & El. 253
- Lynch v. Nurdin 1 QB 29, (1841) Arn and H 158, (1841) 113 ER 1041
- O'Connell v The Queen [1844] 11 Cl. & Fin. 155

== Sources ==
- Kidd, Charles, Williamson, David (editors). Debrett's Peerage and Baronetage (1990 edition). New York: St Martin's Press, 1990.
- Leigh Rayment's Historical List of MPs

Parliament of the United Kingdom
Preceded by Robert Gordon; Theodore Henry Broadhead	Member of Parliament for Wareham; 1818–1820; With: John Calcraft	Succeeded by John Calcraft; John Hales Calcraft
Preceded by The Lord Rancliffe; Joseph Birch	Member of Parliament for Nottingham; 1820–1826; With: Joseph Birch	Succeeded by Joseph Birch; The Lord Rancliffe
Preceded by Joseph Birch; The Lord Rancliffe	Member of Parliament for Nottingham; 1830–1832; With: Sir Ronald Crauford Ferguson	Succeeded by Sir Ronald Crauford Ferguson; Viscount Duncannon
Legal offices
Preceded by Sir James Scarlett	Attorney General for England and Wales; 1830–1832	Succeeded by Sir William Horne
Preceded by The Lord Tenterden	Lord Chief Justice of the Queen's Bench; 1832–1850	Succeeded by The Lord Campbell
Political offices
Preceded by Viscount Althorp	Chancellor of the Exchequer pro tempore 1834	Succeeded by Sir Robert Peel
Peerage of the United Kingdom
New creation	Baron Denman; 1834–1854	Succeeded by Thomas Denman
