= Bruce L. Gillingham =

39th Surgeon General of the United States Navy (born 1959)

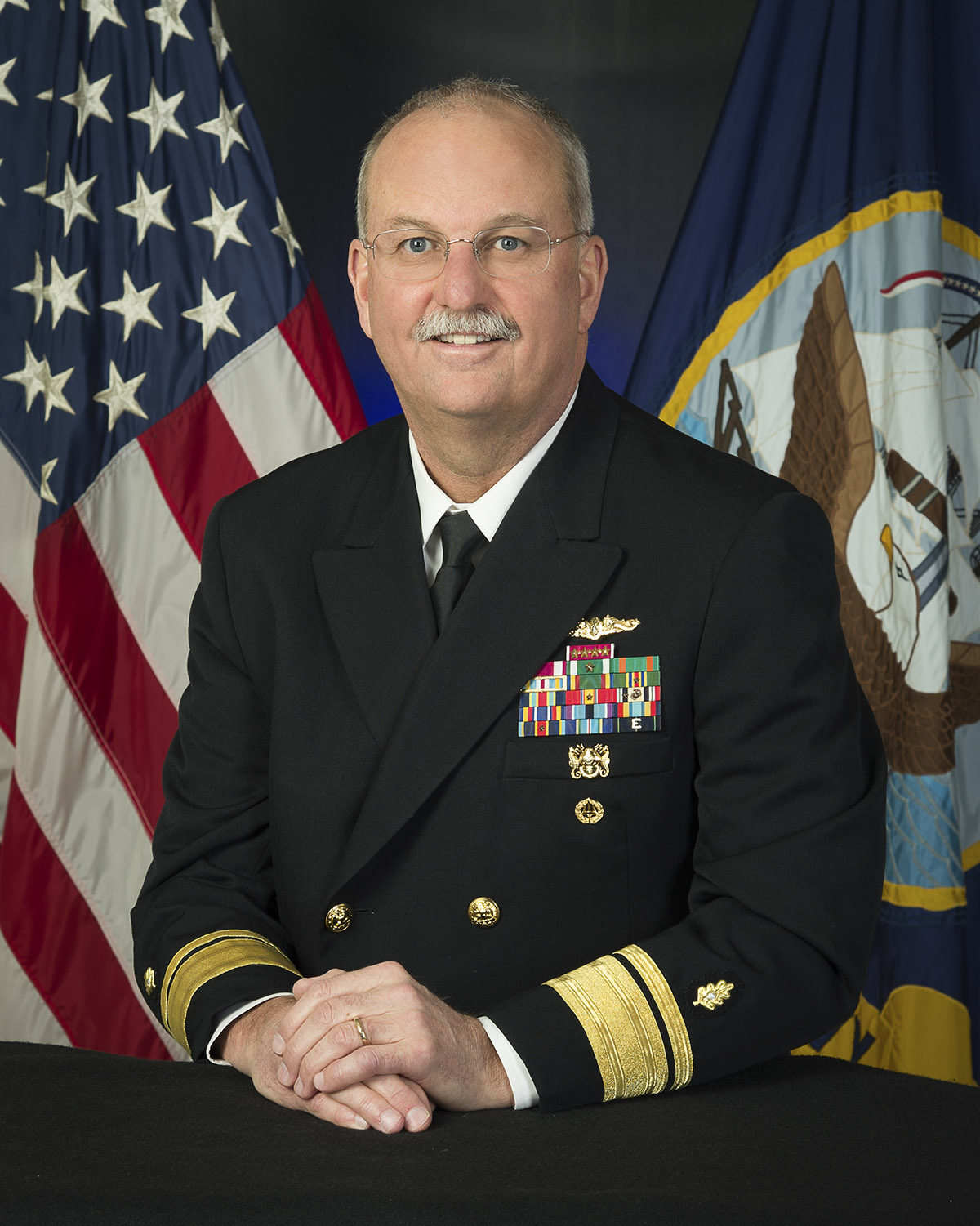
- Born: April 16, 1959 (age 67); Los Angeles County, California
- Education: University of California, San Diego (BA); Uniformed Services University of the Health Sciences (MD)
- Military career
- Allegiance: United States
- Branch: United States Navy
- Service years: 1982–2023
- Rank: Rear admiral
- Commands: Surgeon General of the United States Navy; Navy Medicine West Naval Medical Center San Diego; Naval Hospital Jacksonville
- Conflicts: Iraq War
- Awards: Legion of Merit (5)
- Bruce L. Gillingham's voice Gillingham's opening statement at a Senate Appropriations Defense Subcommittee hearing on military health programs Recorded March 7, 2023

Bruce Lindsley Gillingham (born April 16, 1959) is a retired United States Navy rear admiral and orthopedic surgeon who last served as the 39th surgeon general of the United States Navy from 2019 to 2023. As surgeon general, Gillingham was dual-hatted as the 43rd chief of the Bureau of Medicine and Surgery and was responsible to the United States Secretary of the Navy, Chief of Naval Operations and director of the Defense Health Agency for all health and medical matters pertaining to the Navy and Marine Corps.

== Early life and education ==
Gillingham was born in Los Angeles County, California and raised in San Diego, graduating from Helix High School in La Mesa in 1977. He earned a Bachelor of Arts in Cultural Anthropology (with high honors) from the University of California, San Diego which he attended from 1977 to 1981 and his medical doctorate from the Uniformed Services University of the Health Sciences which he attended from 1982 to 1986. He is an inductee in the medical honor society of Alpha Omega Alpha.

== Naval career ==
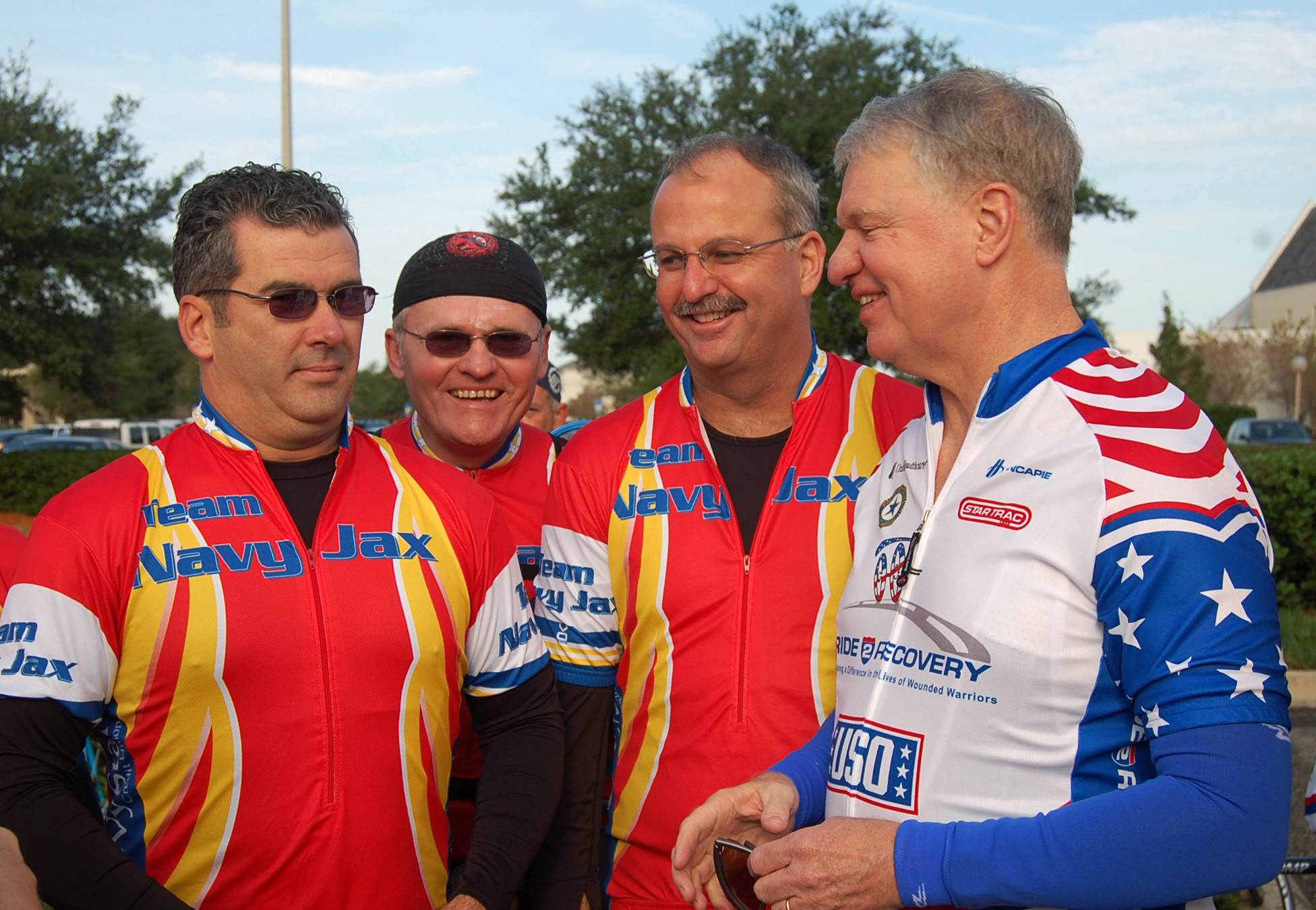
Gillingham and Team Navy Jacksonville members with the Chief of Naval Operations, Admiral Gary Roughead at the Ride 2 Recovery Florida Challenge on December 17, 2009.

Gillingham was commissioned into the United States Navy as an ensign in 1982. Early in his career, Gillingham completed a surgical internship and an orthopedic residency at Naval Medical Center San Diego. He was promoted to lieutenant commander in 1990. He also completed subspecialty training as a pediatric orthopedic surgeon at the Hospital for Sick Children in Toronto, Canada in 1995, qualifying as an undersea and diving medical officer.

Gillingham's operational tours include a period aboard the hospital ship USNS Mercy (T-AH-19) as staff orthopedic surgeon and as director of surgical services. He deployed in support of Operation Iraqi Freedom II as battalion chief of forward professional service for the 1st Force Service Support Group and officer in charge of the Surgical Shock Trauma Platoon, achieving a 98% combat casualty survival rate while providing Echelon II surgical care during Operation Phantom Fury.

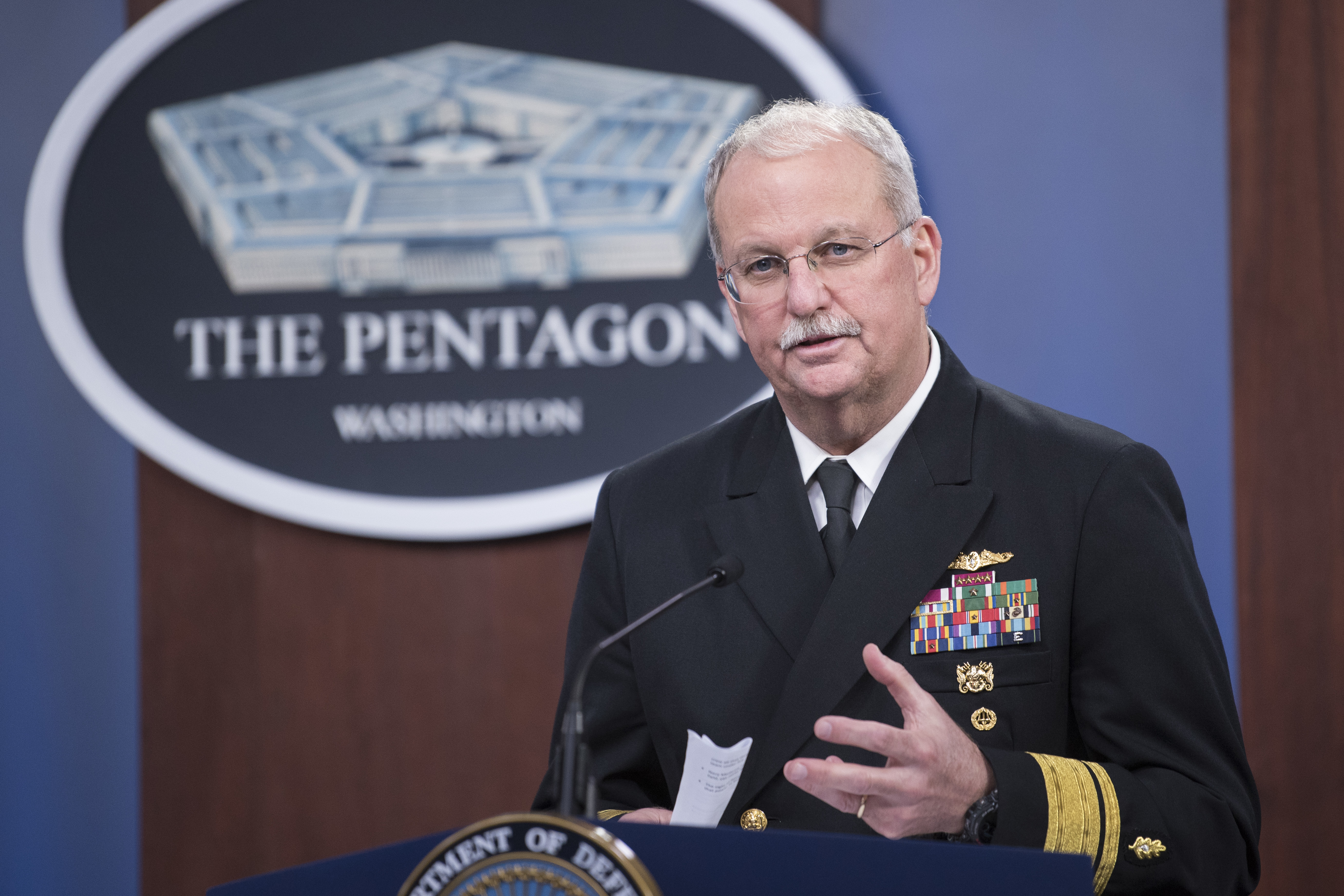
Gillingham speaks at a briefing about the Navy’s response to COVID-19, at the Pentagon, Washington, D.C., April 1, 2020.

His shore assignments include director of Pediatric Orthopedic and Scoliosis Surgery; Associate Orthopedic Residency Program director; and director of Surgical Services. While assigned to Naval Medical Center San Diego, Gillingham played a principal role in establishing the Comprehensive Combat and Complex Casualty Care Center (C5).

Gillingham was commander of Naval Hospital Jacksonville from 2008 to July 2010, United States Pacific Fleet surgeon from 2010 to 2012, and United States Fleet Forces Command fleet surgeon from 2012 to 2013. Promoted to rear admiral (lower half) in July 2013, his first flag assignment was as commander of Navy Medicine West (now Navy Medical Forces Pacific) from 2013 to 2016 and simultaneously dual-hatted as commander of Navy Medical Center San Diego from December 4, 2013, to October 10, 2014.

He was promoted to rear admiral in 2016 and assigned as the first chief quality officer and deputy chief of medical operations of the Bureau of Medicine and Surgery until 2018. Prior to his present assignment, Gillingham succeeded Tina A. Davidson as director of medical resources, plans, and policy, N0931, of the United States Navy from 2018 to 2019.

Gillingham was confirmed as surgeon general of the Navy on October 31, 2019, and succeeded C. Forrest Faison III on November 1. His retirement ceremony was held on March 27, 2023.

== Personal ==
In the 2024 United States presidential election, Gillingham endorsed Kamala Harris.

== Awards and decorations ==
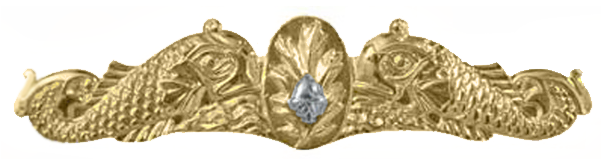

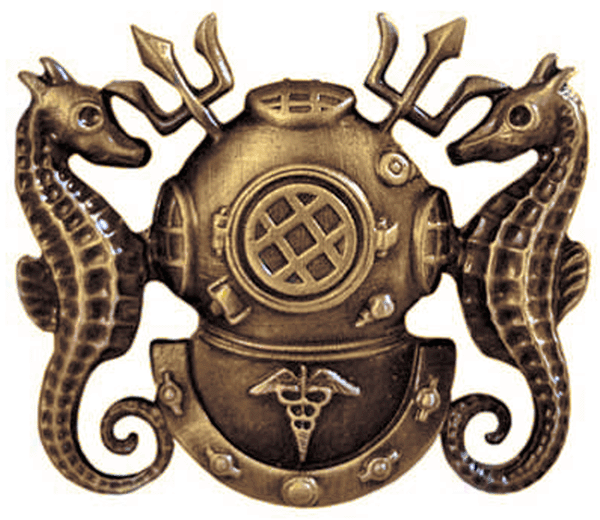

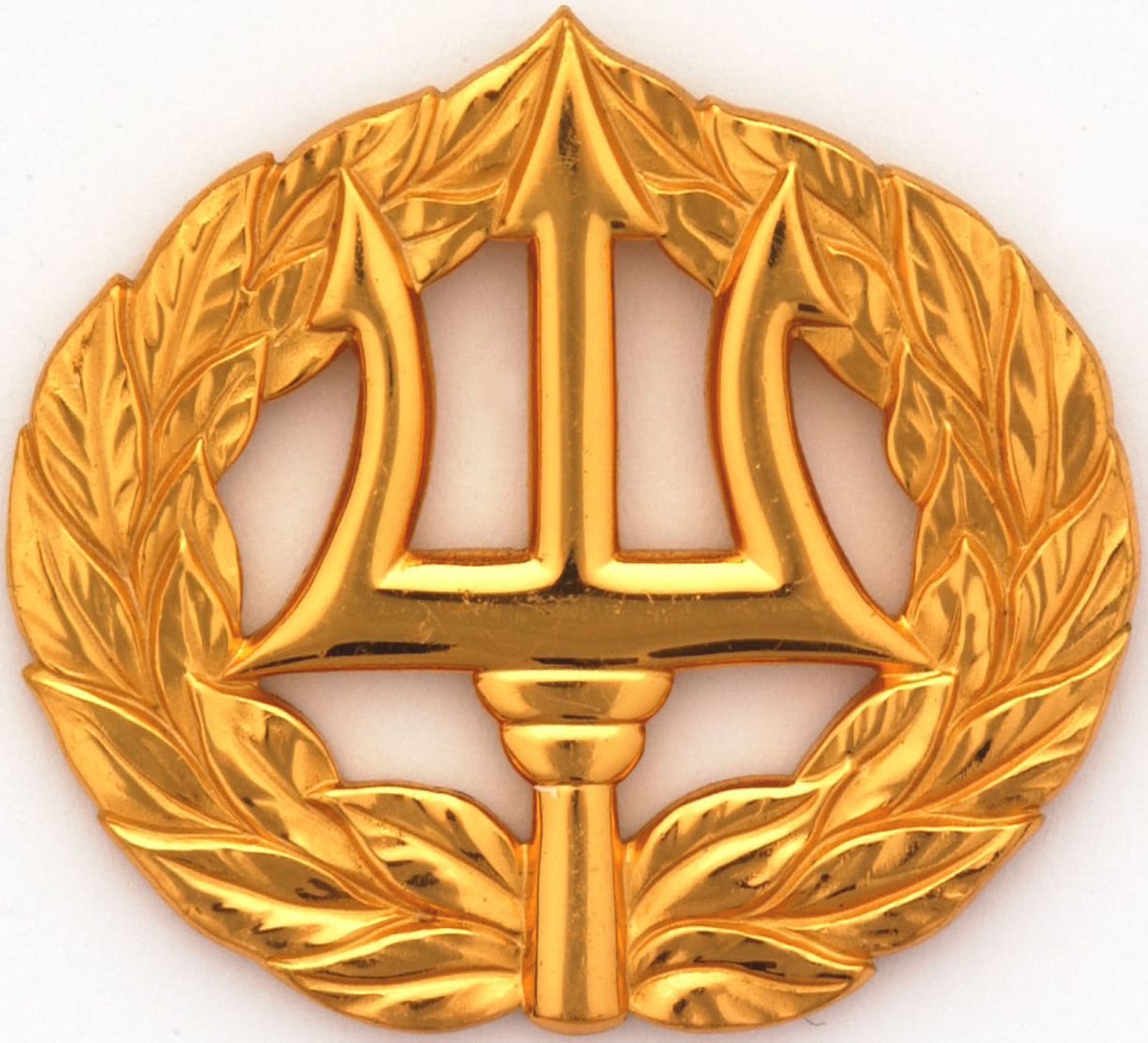

Submarine Warfare Medical Officer Insignia
Legion of Merit with four award stars
Meritorious Service Medal	Navy and Marine Corps Commendation Medal with award star	Navy and Marine Corps Achievement Medal
Joint Meritorious Unit Commendation	Navy Meritorious Unit Commendation	Navy Unit Commendation with bronze service star
Fleet Marine Force Ribbon	National Defense Service Medal with bronze service star	Iraq Campaign Medal with FMF Combat Operation Insignia and bronze service star
Global War on Terrorism Service Medal	Humanitarian Service Medal	Navy Sea Service Deployment Ribbon
Navy and Marine Corps Overseas Service Ribbon with bronze service star	Special Operations Service Ribbon	Navy Expert Rifleman Medal
Navy Diving Medical Officer Insignia
Navy Command Ashore Insignia

Military offices
Preceded by Raquel C. Bono	Commander of Naval Hospital Jacksonville; 2008–2010	Succeeded by Lynn E. Welling
Preceded by Thomas R. Cullison	Fleet Surgeon of the United States Pacific Fleet; 2010–2012	Succeeded by Viswanadham Pothula
Preceded by William M. Roberts	Fleet Surgeon of the United States Fleet Forces Command; 2012–2013	Succeeded by ???
Preceded by C. Forrest Faison III	Commander of Naval Medical Center San Diego; 2013–2014	Succeeded by José A. Acosta
Preceded by C. Forrest Faison III	Commander of Navy Medicine West; 2013–2016	Succeeded by Paul D. Pearigen
New office	Chief Quality Officer and Deputy Chief of Medical Operations of the Bureau of Medicine and Surgery; 2016–2018	Succeeded by Kenneth J. Iverson
Preceded by Tina A. Davidson	Director of Medical Resources, Plans, and Policy of the United States Navy; 2018–2019	Succeeded by Gayle D. Shaffer
Preceded by C. Forrest Faison III	Surgeon General of the United States Navy; 2019–2023	Vacant
