= Naval Center for Combat and Operational Stress Control =

- Active: February 2008 – Present
- Country: United States
- Allegiance: United States of America
- Branch: Navy
- Garrison/HQ: Street and Mailing Address; Naval Center for Combat and Operational Stress Control; 34960 Bob Wilson Drive, Suite 400; San Diego, CA 92134-6400
- Nickname: N.C. COSC
- Website: link

Commanders
- Director: CDR Jeffrey Millegan, MC, USN

The Naval Center for Combat and Operational Stress Control (NCCOSC) is a U.S. Navy Medicine organization established to promote psychological health in the U.S. Navy and Marine Corps. It is a culturally relevant center that leverages sound medical knowledge to improve resilience, preserve psychological health, improve care for sailors, marines and their families and facilitate Navy Medicine research efforts on psychological health and traumatic brain injury.

== History ==
In 2007, several American government commissions examined the healthcare systems of the U.S. Department of Defense (DoD) and the Department of Veterans Affairs (VA) for treating warriors who were wounded in the conflicts in Afghanistan and Iraq. Sweeping recommendations for change were made, the majority of which pertained to what have become known as the signature wounds of the wars, traumatic brain injury (TBI) and posttraumatic stress disorder (PTSD).

As a result, the Department of Defense and the Veterans Health Administration embarked on an overhaul of how their healthcare systems were addressing the needs of wounded warriors with five strategic goals reflecting the breadth of the psychological- health spectrum:

1. Provide timely access to comprehensive care.
2. Provide evidence-based and consistently excellent quality of care.
3. Improve transition and coordination of care across DoD, VA and civilian networks.
4. Promote the use of consistent and effective screening, tracking and monitoring practices.
5. Strengthen psychological health, promote resilience and reduce stigma associated with care through prevention, education, training and outreach.

The U.S. Navy provides all medical services for the Marine Corps. Funded by the Navy Bureau of Medicine and Surgery (BUMED), NCCOSC is located at the Naval Medical Center San Diego; Capt. Paul S. Hammer, a board-certified psychiatrist, was named director of the center in February 2008. Capt. Scott Johnston, a clinical psychologist, succeeded Capt. Hammer as director in April, 2011.

== Mission ==
Naval Center for Combat and Operational Stress Control tries to improve the psychological health of Marines and sailors through comprehensive programs that educate service members, build resilience, aid research and promote best practices in the treatment of combat and operational stress injuries. NCCOSC initiatives are informed by science and provide measurable, wide-reaching results.

To achieve its mission, NCCOSC focuses on these specific areas:

- Stress injuries, PTSD and TBI. NCCOSC educates leaders, sailors, marines and their families to recognize the signs and symptoms of stress illnesses and TBI. It also develops and disseminates programs and tools that build psychological resilience to withstand and cope with combat and operational stress.
- Stress Recognition and Management. NCCOSC designs programs and products to promote resilience, emphasizing the need for it to begin in boot camp and continue through a service member's career. Family resilience also is emphasized to help successfully manage the pressures of all phases of deployment and a high-tempo operational environment.
- Anti-Stigma. NCCOSC addresses negative perceptions that might be attached to any psychological health concern to overcome any barrier to seeking treatment.
- Suicide Prevention. NCCOSC develops instructional materials for all levels of command leaders to actively engage service members in recognizing the warning signs for suicide and the appropriate steps to take for prevention.
- Common Standards and Processes. NCCOSC promotes the best practices among clinicians and caregivers for achieving and maintaining psychological health.

Major NCCOSC Projects in 2011 include:

- Hosted annual Navy and Marine Corps Combat and Operational Stress Control Conference (April)
- Continued development and presentation of suicide-prevention training modules for various Navy communities;
- Development of psychological health pathways for Navy medical treatment facilities;
- Training military healthcare providers in evidenced-based therapies to treat combat and operational stress injuries and illnesses;
- Preparation of white papers to address evidenced-based research in such areas as resilience, PTSD and physical health, and substance abuse and operational stress;
- Expansion of outreach efforts to erase any stigma associated with seeking help for psychological health issues.
