= Rootstown High School =

Public school in Ohio, United States

Location
- 4190 State Route 44; Rootstown, Ohio 44272; United States; 41°06′14″N 81°14′30″W

Information
- Type: Public
- Motto: Enthusiasm, Pride, Commitment
- Established: 1884
- School district: Rootstown Local School District
- Principal: Dakota Berg
- Staff: 20.00 (FTE)
- Grades: 9–12
- Enrollment: 282 (2024-25)
- Student to teacher ratio: 14.10
- Campus type: Rural
- Colors: Navy blue, White
- Athletics conference: Chagrin Valley Conference
- Team name: Rovers
- Website: www.roversk12.org/rootstown-high-school/
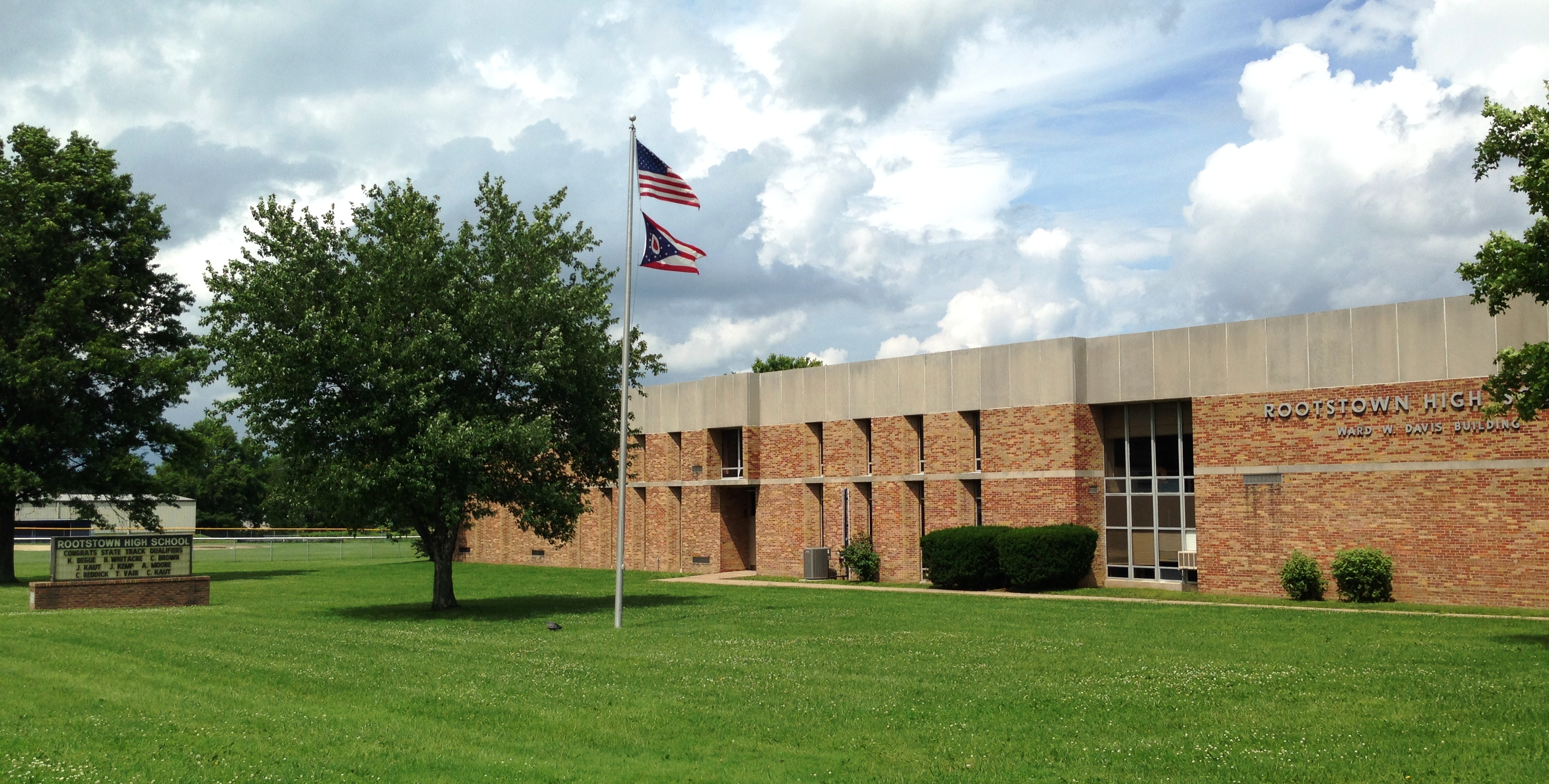
- Front view as seen from Ohio State Route 44

Rootstown High School is a public high school in Rootstown, Ohio, United States. It is the only high school in the Rootstown Local School District. Their nickname is the Rovers.

== History ==
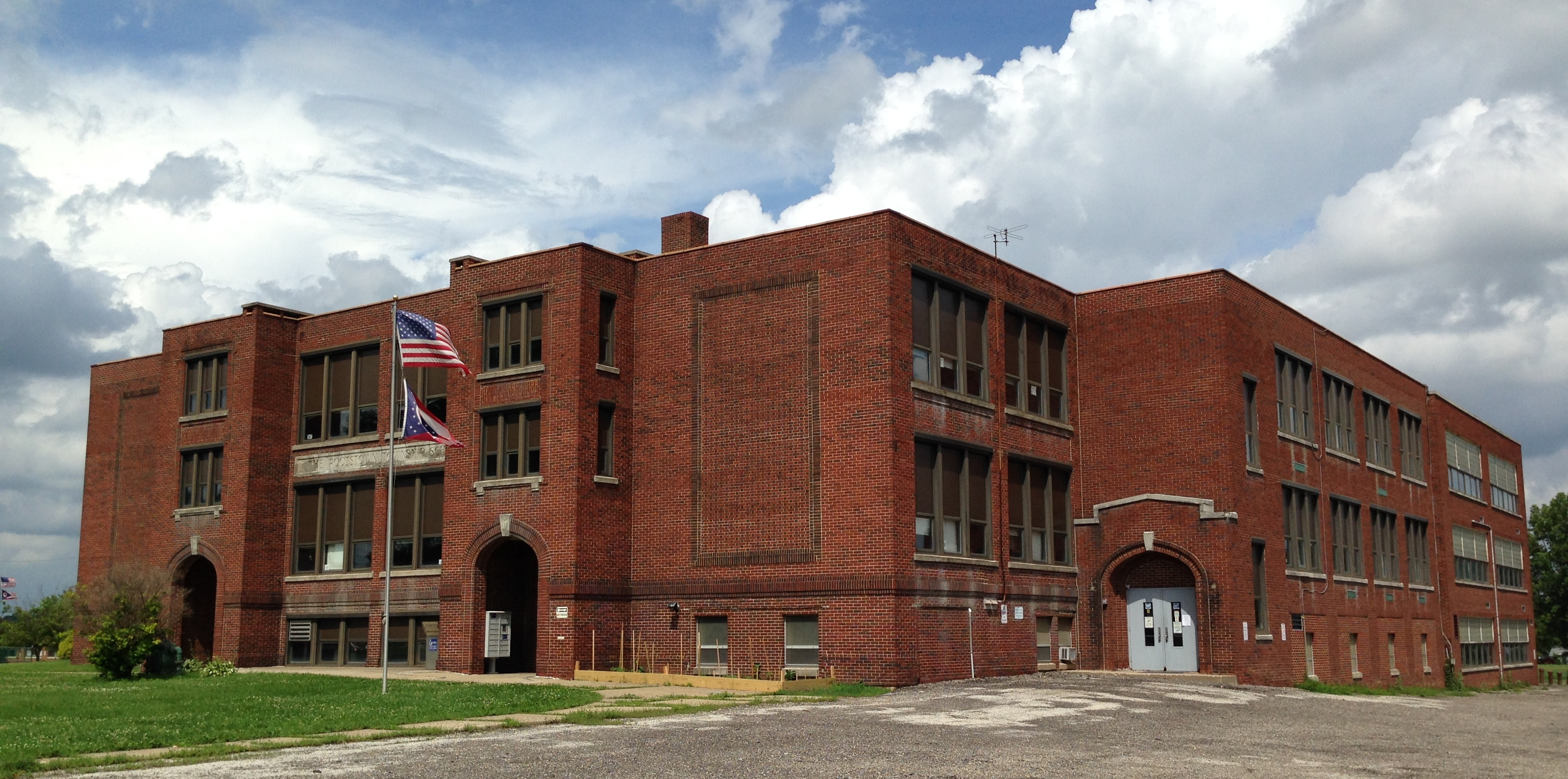
Previous home of the school from 1917–1966

Rootstown High School was established in 1884 and met in a small building adjacent to the town hall a few blocks south of the current campus. This building housed high school students and grade levels, though many students in the township attended smaller schoolhouses spread across 10 rural districts. At the time, Rootstown Township was still divided into several smaller school districts and the high school was not fully accredited. The first class graduated in 1893. During the early 20th century, the smaller districts were gradually consolidated. Following construction of a new building that opened in 1917, the remaining districts in the township consolidated to the new central building and Rootstown High School became a fully accredited four-year high school.

The centralized school, known as the Rootstown Township School, had additions built in 1938, 1950, and 1954. In 1958, population and enrollment growth necessitated construction of a separate elementary school, which was built immediately north of the building, and the existing building continued to house the junior high and high school grades. Following the completion of a new high school building, the original building became Rootstown Middle School.

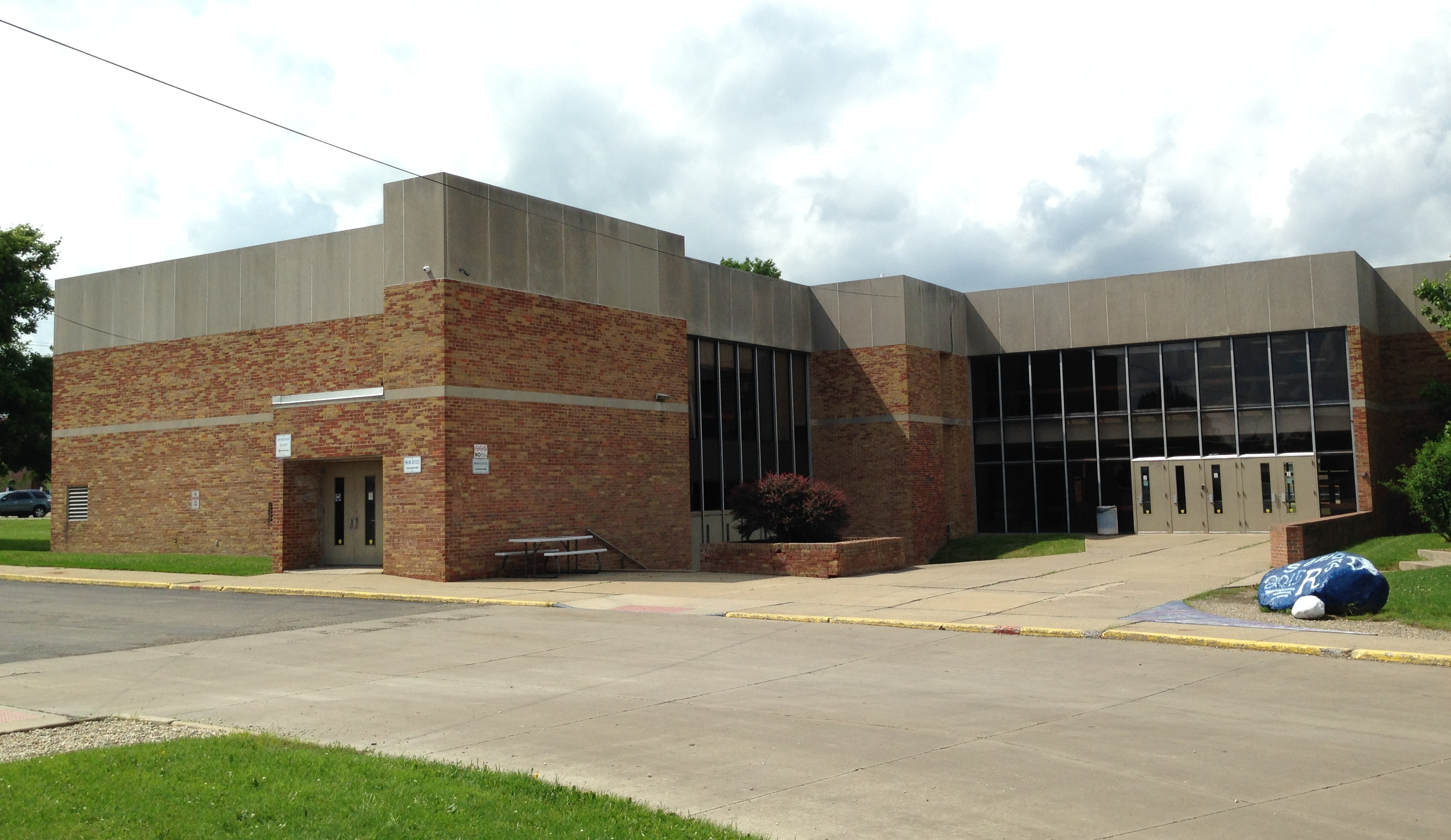
Main entrance

The current school building opened in 1966 and is located on the north end of the Rootstown Schools campus. The building, which also houses the Rootstown Local School District administrative offices, is named in honor of Ward W. Davis, who served as president of the Rootstown School Board for a number of years, including when the current facility opened. As of 2015, the school houses around 450 students in grades 9–12. Adjacent to the east of the high school is Robert C. Dunn Field, which includes an all-weather running track, named for a former RHS principal and football coach. It is used for football, soccer, and track and field. The campus also has athletic fields for baseball and softball.

== Academics ==
Vocational and career education programs are available through Maplewood Career Center in Ravenna, which serves from Rootstown and nine additional school districts in Portage and Summit counties. The school offers 21 programs that are available to students in the 11th and 12th grades.

== Athletics ==
Rootstown High School athletic teams are known as the Rovers and the school colors are navy blue and white. Since 2025, the school has competed as a member of the Chagrin Valley Conference. Prior to 2025, Rootstown was a long-time member of the Portage Trail Conference and the Portage County League. All Rover athletic teams play their home games on the Rootstown Schools campus with a few exceptions. The bowling and golf teams play their home matches at other nearby locations. Bowling matches are held at Twin Star Lanes in Brady Lake, and the golf teams host home matches at Sunny Hill Golf Course in Brimfield.

The first interpretation of the word Rover at Rootstown was a dog; a collie or German shepherd. In 1960 a new version of the mascot was adopted: the Rover that is defined as "a pirate, a wanderer, or a roamer" in Webster's Dictionary. The Rovers logo is a ship that is meant to symbolize the Norsemen. The current version of the nickname came into existence in the early years of RHS sports. The Rovers did not have a facility in which to engage in competitive sporting activities, thus they would "wander and roam" to other schools for sports, pirating victories.

Rootstown fields the following varsity teams:

Fall sports

- Boys cross country
- Girls cross country
- Football
- Boys golf
- Girls golf
- Boys soccer
- Girls soccer
- Girls volleyball
- Cheerleading

Winter sports

- Boys basketball
- Girls basketball
- Boys bowling
- Girls bowling
- Boys wrestling
- Cheerleading

Spring sports

- Baseball
- Softball
- Boys track and field
- Girls track and field

Two Rover sports teams have been state semifinalists: the 1981 football team and the 2003 softball team.

== Victory Bell ==
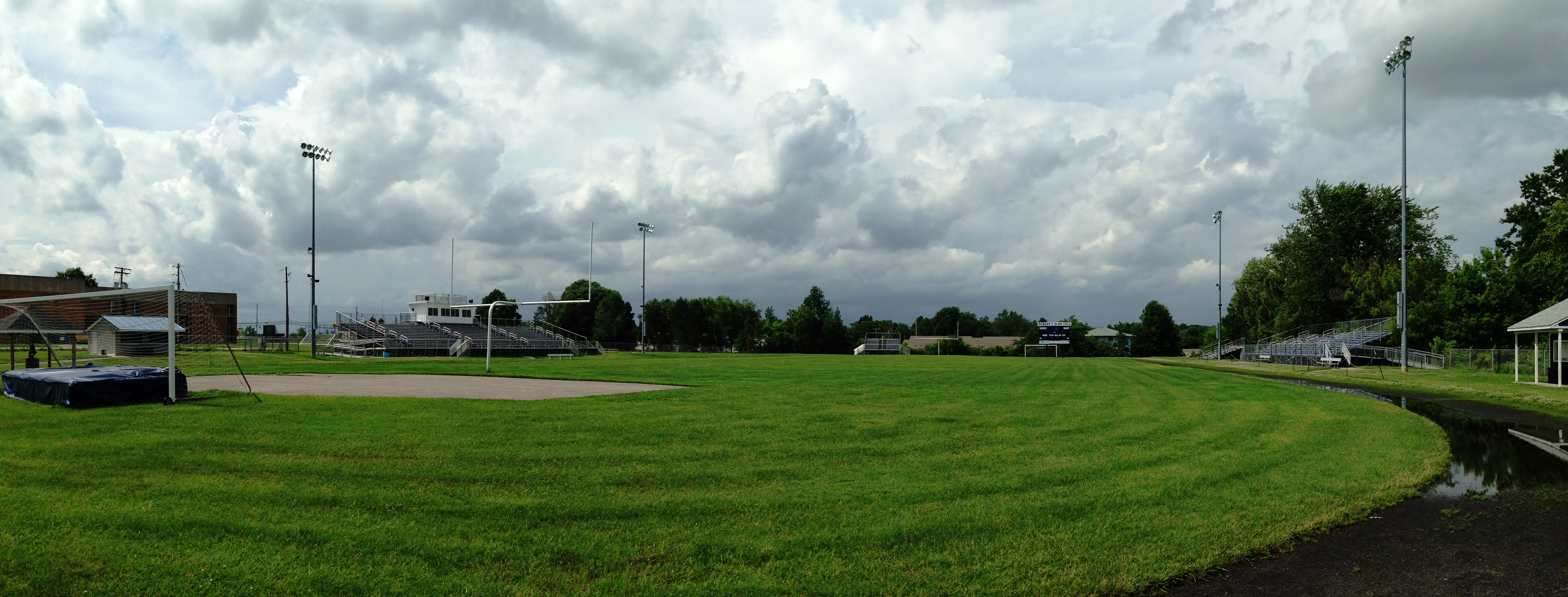
Robert C. Dunn Field

Right next to the football field, there is a large brass bell. In the 1950s the bell was on a steam locomotive on the Erie-Lackawanna Railroad, and it was donated to Portage County and used as a football championship trophy. From 1957 to 1962, Rootstown won the bell for six straight years, and it was permanently awarded to them. The bell used to be mounted on a rolling platform and would be rolled down to the football field before each game so that the Rootstown Rover football team could ring the bell after each home victory. In 2013 a concrete pad was poured to mount the bell on, and an open-sided structure was built over the bell at the south end zone of Robert C. Dunn Field. The bell continues to be rung after each home victory.

== Notable alumni ==
- Brian McClure (Class of 1982), former collegiate and professional football player
- Jessica Eye (Class of 2005), professional mixed martial artist with the Ultimate Fighting Championship
