= Bio-Med Science Academy =

Location
- 4209 State Route 44; Rootstown, Ohio 44272; United States
- 41°06′11″N 81°14′43″W

Information
- Funding type: Public
- Founded: 2012
- Chief Administrative Officer: Stephanie Lammlein
- Chief Operating Officer/Principal: Lindsey McLaughlin - Rootstown Campus Rachel Hughes - Rootstown Campus Tabatha England - Ravenna Campus Laura Kollat - Shalersville Campus
- Staff: 57
- Grades: K–12
- Enrollment: 960 (2023-2024)
- Language: English
- Campus: Rural
- Colors: Lime Green and blue
- Team name: Bees
- Accreditations: Ohio Department of Education; STEM Accreditation
- Communities served: Portage County, Northeast Ohio
- Affiliation: Northeast Ohio Medical University
- Website: biomedscienceacademy.org
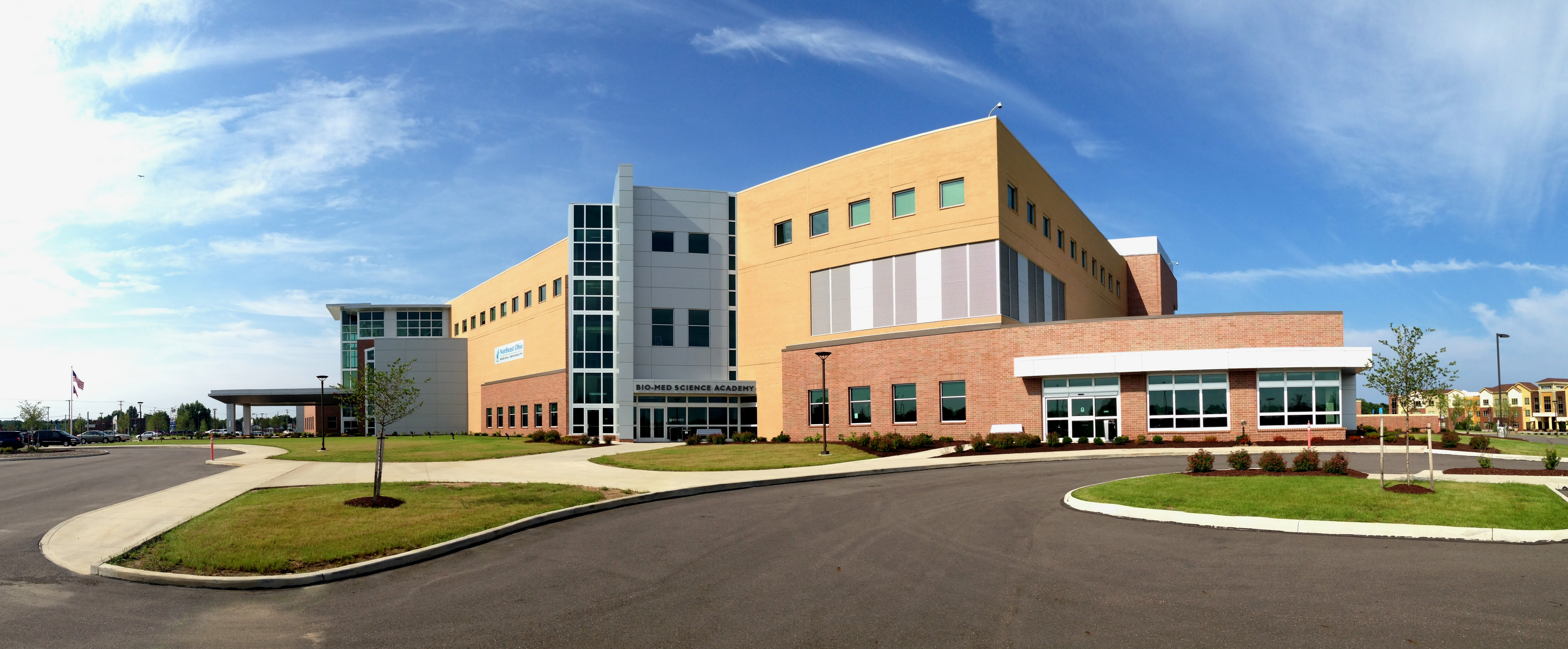
- Main entrance, 2015

Bio-Med Science Academy is a public STEM+M (Science, Technology, Engineering, Mathematics, plus Medicine) school in Portage County, Ohio, United States. The school's original location, now known as the Rootstown campus, is on the campus of Northeast Ohio Medical University (NEOMED) in Rootstown, and houses grades 7 through 12. The school, originally a grades 9–12 high school, has expanded to include lower grade levels, with grades 5 and 6 at its Ravenna campus and grades K-4 at the Shalersville campus. Bio-Med opened as a community charter school in August 2012, but in April 2013 the school received a formal STEM designation for the State of Ohio. This new designation required the closing of the community school which occurred June 30, 2013, and the opening of Bio-Med Science Academy STEM School on July 1, 2013. With its new title it became an official independent and public STEM school.

The academy began with an initial freshmen class of 70 students. 119 students were admitted for the 2013–14 academic year, 109 were accepted for the 2014–15 year and 110 for the 2015–16 year. For the 2017–18 school year, Bio-Med expanded to grades 6–12 with the opening of the Lower Academy in Shalersville Township. Total enrollment in the academy now surpasses 1,000 students from over 41 district across eight counties. There is a 50/50 male to female ratio.

For the 2020–21 year an addition was completed at the Rootstown campus to house 7th and 8th graders who had previously been at the Shalersville campus, making the Shalersville campus open for 2nd, 3rd, and 4th grades while 6th grade was moved to the Ravenna campus with the 5th graders.

The school operates on a year-round academic schedule and is a member of the Akron hub of the Ohio Stem Learning Network. The Upper Academy is housed on the third floor of the NEOMED Education and Wellness (NEW) Center, which opened in August 2014. Previously, the school was located in another part of the NEOMED campus for the first two academic years. Bio-Med Science Academy was granted Ohio STEM designation in April 2013. Within its first year, the school claimed first place at the Regional Engineer Career Day. Bio-Med Science Academy was one of seven schools recognized by Ohio Governor John Kasich in January 2017 as a recipient of the governor's innovation awards.

== Clubs and activities ==
The academy is home to over 28 different clubs with many different activities to choose from depending on the student's interests. Various interest clubs such as science fiction, science Olympiad, and student government.

As of the 2024-2025 school year, the district has no sports besides a competitive and casual gaming/chess club. This is because of a lack of outdoor space on the campus. Most of the students play sports for their home districts.
