= Northeast Ohio Medical University =

Public university in Rootstown, Ohio, US

Northeast Ohio Medical University (NEOMED)
- Former names: Northeast Ohio Universities College of Medicine (1973–2007); Northeast Ohio Universities Colleges of Medicine and Pharmacy (2007–2011)
- Type: Public health sciences university
- Established: November 23, 1973; 52 years ago
- Parent institution: University System of Ohio
- Affiliations: Akron Children's Hospital; Aultman Hospital; Cleveland Clinic Akron General; Mercy Health; Summa Health; University Hospitals
- Academic affiliations: University of Akron; Cleveland State University; Hiram College; Kent State University; Youngstown State University
- Endowment: $30.8 million (2025)
- President: John Langell
- Provost: C. Forrest Faison III
- Faculty: 96 Rootstown-based
- Administrative staff: 404 (2019)
- Students: 1,032 (Fall 2025); D.D.S. - 50; M.D. - 615; Pharm.D. - 297; Graduate - 70; Dual Enrollment- 18
- Location: Rootstown, Ohio, United States; 41°06′11″N 81°14′39″W
- Campus: Rural, 120 acres (49 ha)
- Colors: Blue and Gray
- Mascot: Nate the Walking Whale
- Website: neomed.edu
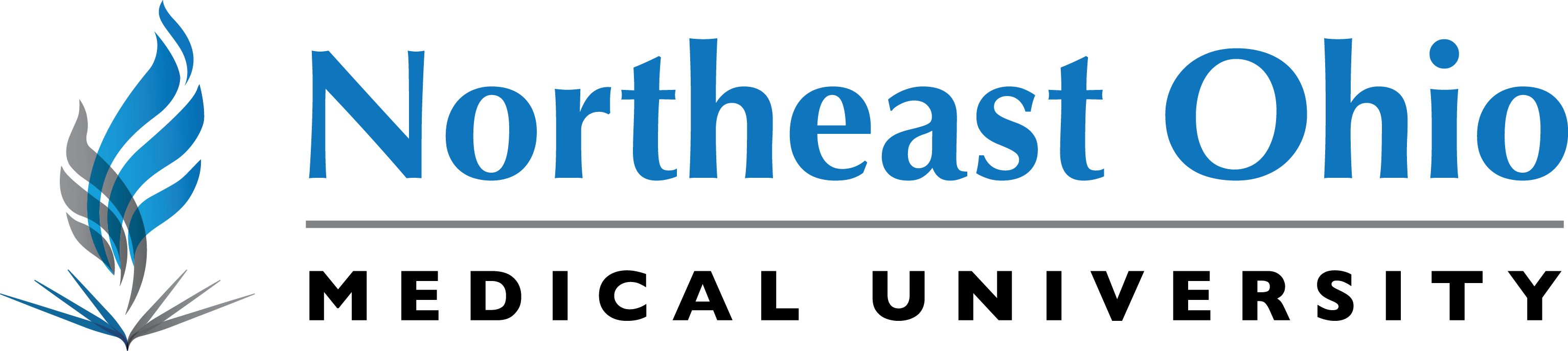

Northeast Ohio Medical University (NEOMED) is a public medical school in Rootstown, Ohio, United States. Founded in 1973, the university has four colleges — in medicine, pharmacy, dentistry and graduate studies — and offers Doctor of Medicine (M.D.), Doctor of Pharmacy (Pharm.D.) and Doctor of Dental Surgery (D.D.S.) degrees, as well as master’s and doctoral degrees. The university also has a broad research portfolio concentrated in seven focus areas, yielding research opportunities in medical and life science areas.

== History ==
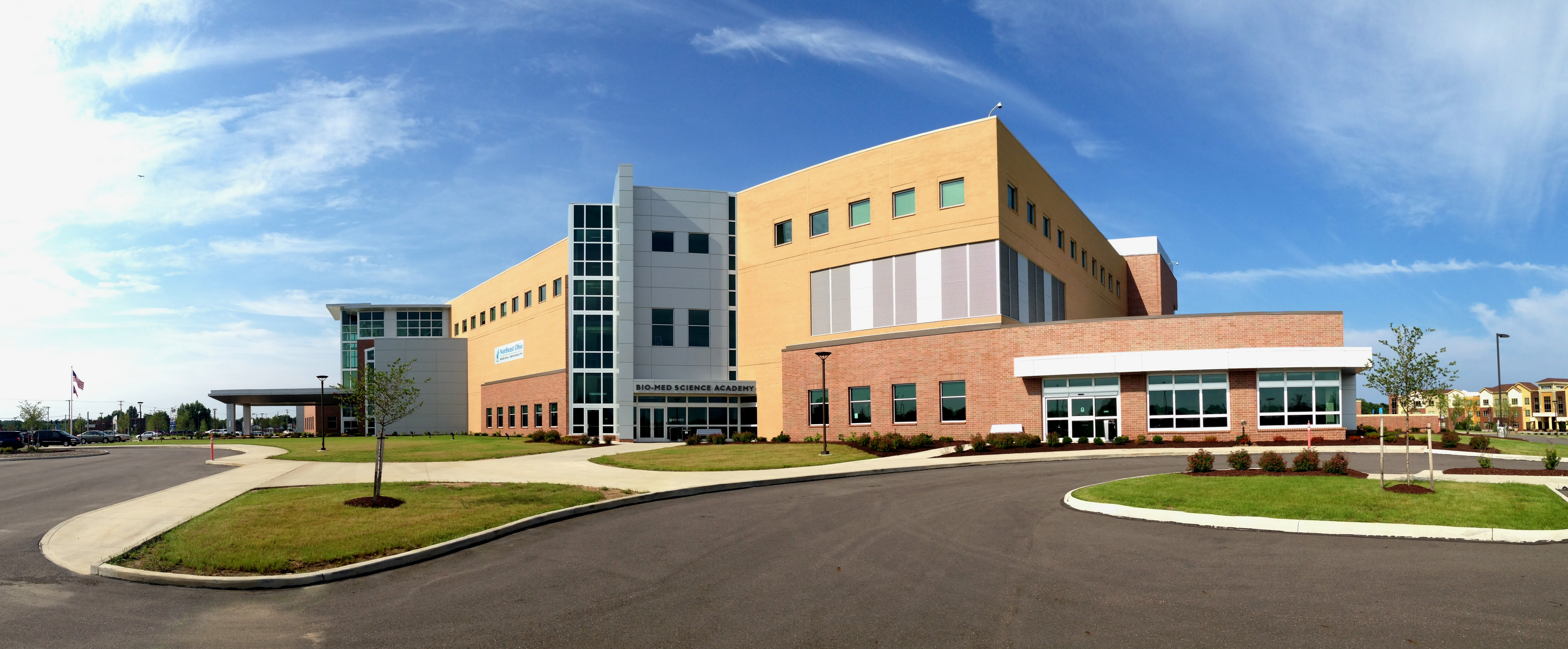
NEOMED Education and Wellness Center in 2015, prior to expansion

In the 1960s, three public universities in Northeast Ohio – Kent State University, University of Akron, and Youngstown State University – each began to explore the feasibility of developing a medical school on their campuses, and to lobby legislators and the Ohio Board of Regents for approval. Senate Bill 457 was passed in June 1972, authorizing funds to “a consortium of state universities in northeast Ohio to prepare detailed plans for medical education programs by January 1, 1973.” The three institutions formed the Northeastern Medical Education Development Center of Ohio (MEDCO) to develop those plans. Stanley W. Olson, M.D., was engaged as a consultant to help the universities conceptualize and create a consortium medical school.

Early in the 110th General Assembly session, Senator Robert Stockdale of Portage County introduced Senate Bill 72 establishing the Northeastern Ohio Universities College of Medicine. Funds for the proposed new consortium medical school were included in the Biennial Appropriations bill, which passed on June 14, 1973. One month later, on July 11, Senate Bill 72 came up for vote, passing unanimously 32-0 (the House vote was 89-5). SB72 was signed into law on August 24, 1973, with an effective date of November 23, 1973.

The campus site in Rootstown along Ohio State Route 44 near Interstate 76 was selected in 1974 with groundbreaking in December 1975. The first class was selected in September 1977 and included 42 students from UA, KSU, and YSU in a combined B.S./M.D. program. They graduated in 1981, the same year the school became fully accredited.

The College of Pharmacy, approved in 2005, was inaugurated with 75 students in August 2007 in the Doctor of Pharmacy degree program, and the school's name was changed accordingly to the Northeastern Ohio Universities Colleges of Medicine and Pharmacy. In keeping with the school's rural setting, the Doctor of Pharmacy program has a community pharmacy emphasis. The university graduated its inaugural class of 61 pharmacists in May 2011.

House Bill 562 was approved in June 2008, establishing NEOUCOM as an independent health sciences university serving Northeast Ohio. The following year, in July 2009, the College of Graduate Studies was established. The university received degree granting authority for a Master of Public Health degree and established a bioethics certificate program as well as an M.S. and Ph.D. in integrative pharmaceutical medicine (now basic and translational biomedicine).

Jay Gershen began his term as the sixth president of the university on January 15, 2010. In his February 2010 address, he announced a name change for the university to Northeast Ohio Medical University (NEOMED). This was signed into law on April 29, 2011. Following Gershen's retirement in 2019, John Langell was appointed the seventh president of the university.

NEOMED announced the creation of a new dental school in 2022, the Bitonte College of Dentistry. At the time, a shortage of dentists in the state was cited, as Ohio only had two dental schools, the public College of Dentistry at The Ohio State University in Columbus and the private School of Dental Medicine at Case Western Reserve University in Cleveland. The first class of the Bitonte College of Dentistry began in August 2025.

== Accreditation ==
The College of Medicine is accredited by the Liaison Committee on Medical Education and the College of Pharmacy is accredited by the Accreditation Council for Pharmacy Education. The Bitonte College of Dentistry is accredited by the Commission on Dental Accreditation. The Master of Public Health program is accredited by the Council on Education for Public Health.

== Campus ==
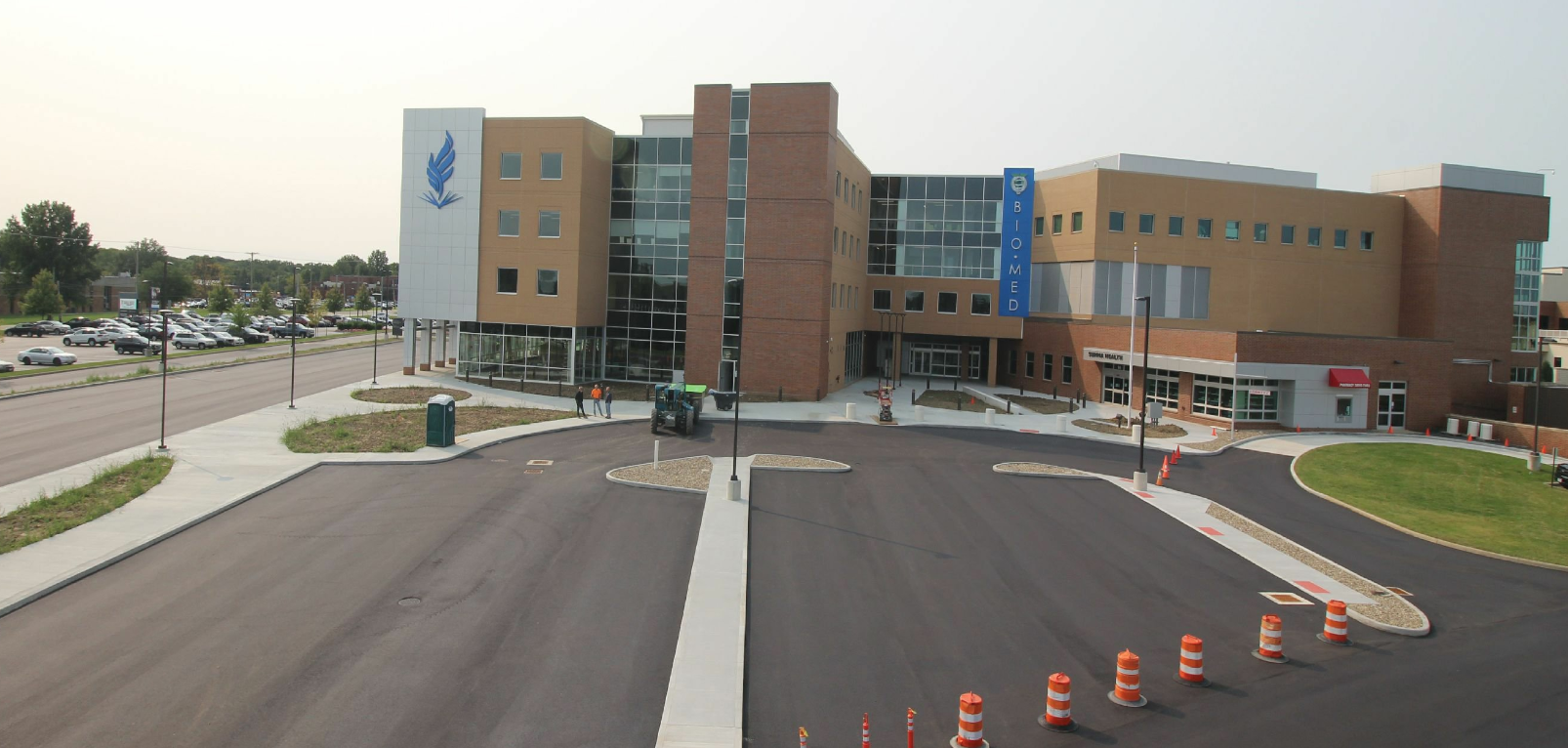
NEW Center and Bio-Med Science Academy main entrance in 2020 after expansion

The main campus is located in Rootstown, Ohio, approximately 14 miles (23 km) east of Akron, 33 miles (53 km) west of Youngstown, and 45 miles (72 km) southeast of Cleveland.

The third floor of the NEW Center is home to the Bio-Med Science Academy, a STEM public school for grades 7–12. On the northern edge of campus, the university offers on-campus housing for professional students, faculty, and staff in The Village at NEOMED, which opened in 2014.

== Bio-Med Science Academy ==
In August 2012, Northeast Ohio Medical University opened Bio-Med Science Academy, a public high school with a Science, Technology, Engineering, and Math (STEM) curriculum and an additional focus on medicine (STEM+M). The first class had 70 students with successive freshmen classes added each school year. As of August 2024, enrollment is approximately 1200 students between grades 1-12 and across three campuses.

== Notable alumni ==
- Amy Acton, M.D. (1990), Ohio Governor-elect, director of Ohio Department of Health during the COVID-19 pandemic
- Angela Funovits (2013), magician who performed on NBC's Phenomenon
- Crystal Mackall, MD (1985) Ernest and Amelia Gallo Family Professor and Professor of Pediatrics and of Medicine, Stanford University
- Amit Majmudar, M.D. (2003), Ohio's first Poet Laureate

== Notable faculty ==
- Frederick Frese, psychologist and schizophrenia researcher.
- C. Owen Lovejoy, anthropologist who reconstructed Lucy (Australopithecus).
- Hans Thewissen, paleontologist who discovered Ambulocetus natans, which inspired the NEOMED mascot, Nate the Walking Whale.
- C. Forrest Faison III, provost, retired vice admiral (VADM) in the United States Navy and 38th Surgeon General of the United States Navy

== See also ==
- University System of Ohio
- Medical education in the United States
- List of medical schools in the United States
- List of pharmacy schools in the United States
- List of dental schools in the United States
