= Kade McClure =

American baseball player (born 1996)

- Pitcher
- Born: February 12, 1996 (age 30); Mentor, Ohio, U.S.
- Bats: Right Throws: Right
- Stats at Baseball Reference

Kade Robert McClure (born February 12, 1996) is an American former professional baseball pitcher. He played college baseball for the University of Louisville. He was selected by the Chicago White Sox in the sixth round of the 2017 Major League Baseball draft.

== Personal life ==
McClure is the son of Brian McClure and Lisa McClure, and has a sibling, Shane. He is married to Ryleigh Vertes, older sister of Dance Moms Star Kendall Vertes, and daughter of Jill Vertes. His father played football at Bowling Green State, and was an NFL quarterback with the Buffalo Bills in 1987. His mother played college volleyball at Bowling Green State. He is 6' 7" tall.

== Amateur career ==
McClure was born and raised in Mentor, Ohio ('14), where grew up and played youth football with future National Football League quarterback Mitch Trubisky. He attended Mentor High School where he played baseball, basketball (at power forward; winning a state championship), and football (at quarterback). As a junior in 2013, McClure went 10–1 with a 0.88 ERA and 83 strikeouts over 71 2/3 innings. Although McClure was expected to be selected in the 2014 Major League Baseball draft, he went undrafted and thus enrolled at the University of Louisville where he played college baseball.

In 2015, McClure's freshman season at Louisville, he appeared in 16 games (four starts) in which he compiled a 1–1 record with a 4.18 ERA. As a sophomore in 2016, he pitched in 15 games (making 13 starts) and went 12–0 with a 2.54 ERA, garnering a 0.88 WHIP while striking out 77 batters over 78 innings, earning All-American honors. Following the season, he played in the Cape Cod Baseball League with the Brewster Whitecaps. As a junior in 2017, McClure was Louisville's number two starter. For the year, he started 18 games, pitching to an 8–4 record with a 3.58 ERA, compiling 111 strikeouts over 103 innings. Following the season, he was selected by the Chicago White Sox in the sixth round of the 2017 Major League Baseball draft.

== Professional career ==
=== Chicago White Sox ===
McClure signed with the White Sox and made his professional debut in 2017 with the Rookie-level Arizona League White Sox before earning a promotion to the Great Falls Voyagers of the Rookie Advanced Pioneer League in July. In August, he was promoted to the Kannapolis Intimidators of the Single–A South Atlantic League. Pitching between the three teams, he was 1–0 with one save and gave up one run while striking out 19 in 11 innings with an 0.82 ERA.

He began the 2018 season back with Kannapolis, but his season was cut short after eight starts due to a knee injury that required surgery. Over those eight starts, he went 3–1 with a 3.02 ERA, striking out 42 batters over 41 2/3 innings.

McClure returned healthy in 2019 and began the season back with Kannapolis before being promoted to the Winston-Salem Dash of the High–A Carolina League in June. Over 22 starts between the two clubs, he pitched to a 4–6 record with a 3.25 ERA, compiling 99 strikeouts and a 1.22 WHIP over 121 2/3 innings.

McClure did not play in a game in 2020 due to the cancellation of the minor league season because of the COVID-19 pandemic. To begin the 2021 season, he was assigned to the Birmingham Barons of the Double-A South. After 15 starts in which he pitched to a 2–4 record, a 3.82 ERA, and 77 strikeouts over 68 1/3 innings, he was promoted to the Charlotte Knights of the Triple-A East in early August. Over nine starts with Charlotte, McClure went 2–3 with a 6.81 ERA and 36 strikeouts over 37 innings. His aggregate 111 strikeouts (in 102 1/3 innings) was second in the White Sox system. He was named the 2021 White Sox Pitching Prospect of the Year by MLB Pipeline.

He returned to Charlotte for the 2022 season. McClure was 4–4 with one save and a 4.97 ERA, as in 44 games (5 starts) he pitched 87 innings and struck out 96 batters. His fastball averaged 93 mph in early season starts, and then 95 mph out of the bullpen late in the season. He threw four pitches, including an above-average slider.

=== San Francisco Giants ===
On December 22, 2022, McClure was traded to the San Francisco Giants in exchange for pitcher Gregory Santos. He spent 2023 with the Triple–A Sacramento River Cats, playing in 9 games and recording a 5.79 ERA with 13 strikeouts across 23 1/3 innings of work. McClure elected free agency following the season on November 6, 2023.

=== Pittsburgh Pirates ===
On February 9, 2024, McClure signed a minor league deal with the Pittsburgh Pirates. He was assigned to the Indianapolis Indians of the Triple-A International League to open the 2024 season. In 9 appearances split between Indianapolis and the Double–A Altoona Curve, he struggled to a combined 15.55 ERA with 9 strikeouts across 11 innings pitched. On July 19, McClure retired from professional baseball.

== Post-playing career ==
In August 2024, McClure joined Kent State University as the program's director of pitching development.
