= Triangle Lake Bog State Nature Preserve =

Nature reserve in Ohio, United States

Triangle Lake Bog
- Triangle Lake Bog State Nature Preserve
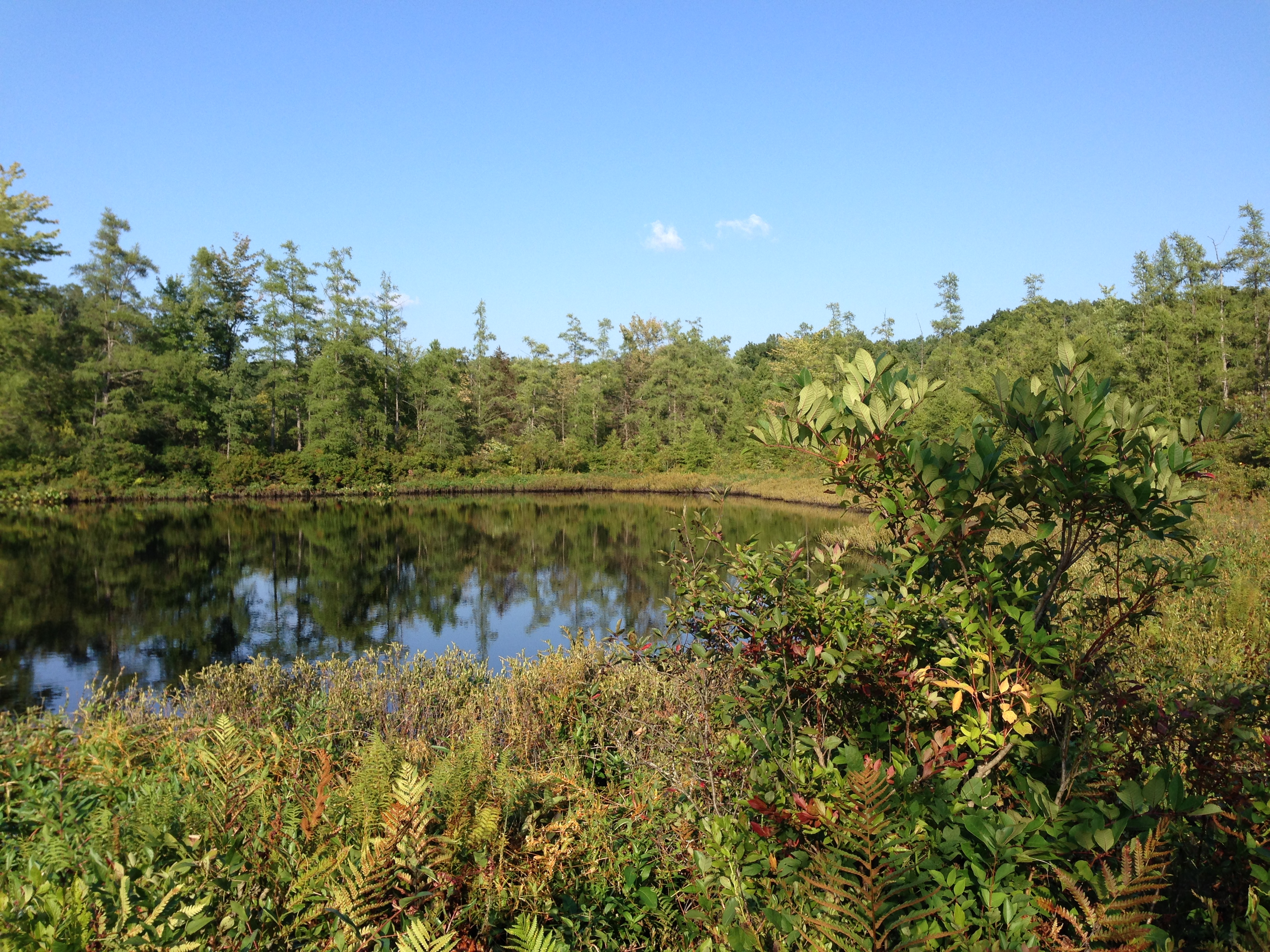

- Location within Ohio Location within the United States
- Location: Portage County, Ohio
- Nearest city: Ravenna
- Coordinates: 41.11890°N 81.25612°W
- Area: 61 acres (25 ha)
- Website: http://naturepreserves.ohiodnr.gov/trianglelakebog

Triangle Lake Bog or Triangle Lake Bog State Nature Preserve is a 61-acre (25 ha) state nature preserve in the U.S. state of Ohio. It is located in Rootstown Township, south of Ravenna.

== Flora ==
It is home to a number of plants including the round-leaved sundew, leatherleaf, highbush blueberry, large cranberry, poison sumac, sphagnum moss and catberry.

== Landscape ==
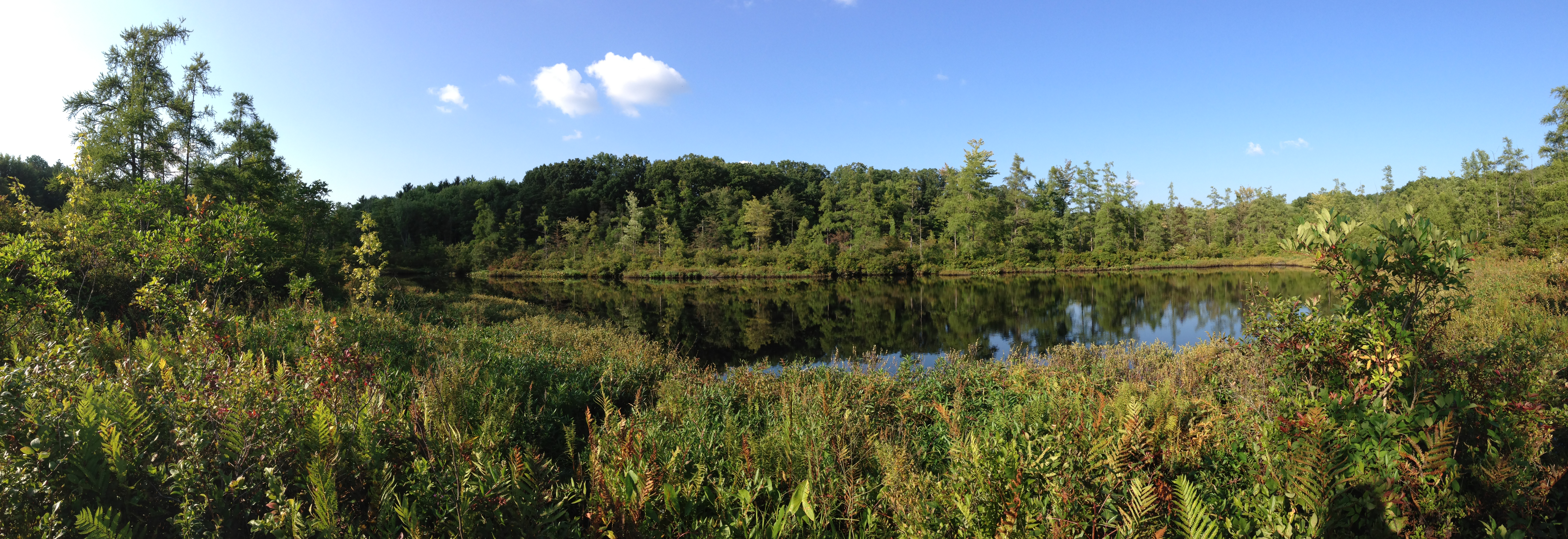
Panorama of Triangle Lake at Triangle Lake Bog State Nature Preserve.

== See also ==
- Kettle (landform)
