= John Langell =

John T. Langell
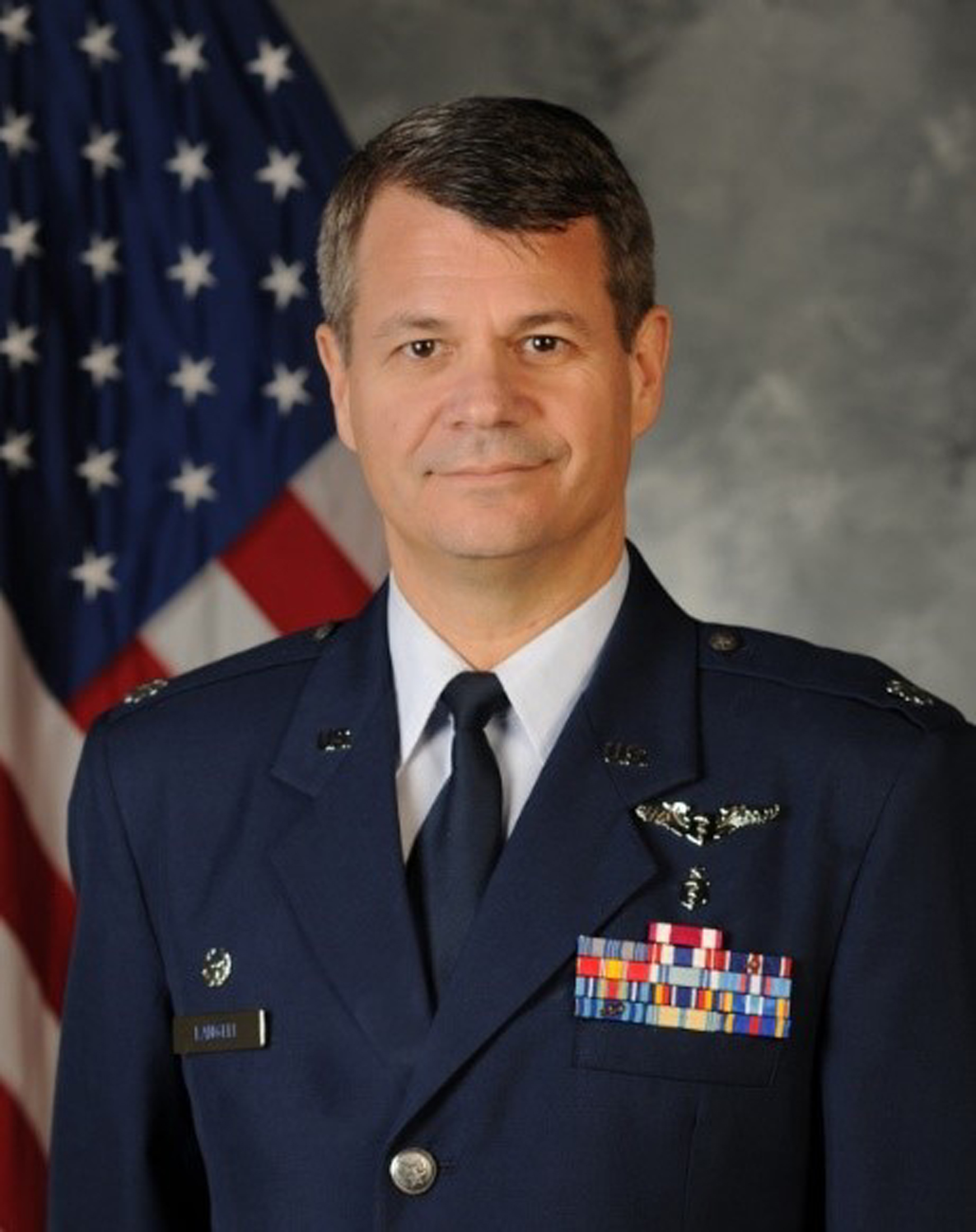
- Langell while serving as the Commander of the U.S. Air Force's 349th Medical Group

7th President of Northeast Ohio Medical University
- Incumbent
- Assumed office October 2019
- Preceded by: Jay A. Gershen

Personal details
- Education: University of California, Los Angeles (BS); Drexel University (MD-PhD); University of Texas Medical Branch (MPH); University of Utah (MBA)

Military service
- Branch/service: United States Air Force
- Rank: Colonel
- Unit: 349th Medical Group

John T. Langell is an American physician, surgeon, inventor and academic leader. Since October 2019, he has served as the seventh President of Northeast Ohio Medical University (NEOMED). Prior to his appointment at NEOMED, Langell served as Vice Dean at the University of Utah School of Medicine and as an officer in the United States Air Force.

== Early life and education ==
Langell was raised in Southern California and received his Bachelor of Science from UCLA. He attended medical school, completing an MD-PhD, at Drexel University College of Medicine before completing a surgical residency at Stanford University School of Medicine and an aerospace medicine residency at NASA/University of Texas Medical Branch.

== Career ==
Langell served as a colonel in the United States Air Force, including serving as the commander of the 349th Medical Group. Langell also served as the vice dean of innovation at the University of Utah School of Medicine.

Langell is a co-founder and President of Xenocor, a company that produces disposable laparoscopes. Langell was appointed the seventh President of Northeast Ohio Medical University in October 2019. During Langell's tenure, NEOMED announced the creation of a new dental school.
