= Rootstown Township, Ohio =

Township in Ohio, US

Rootstown Township
- Township
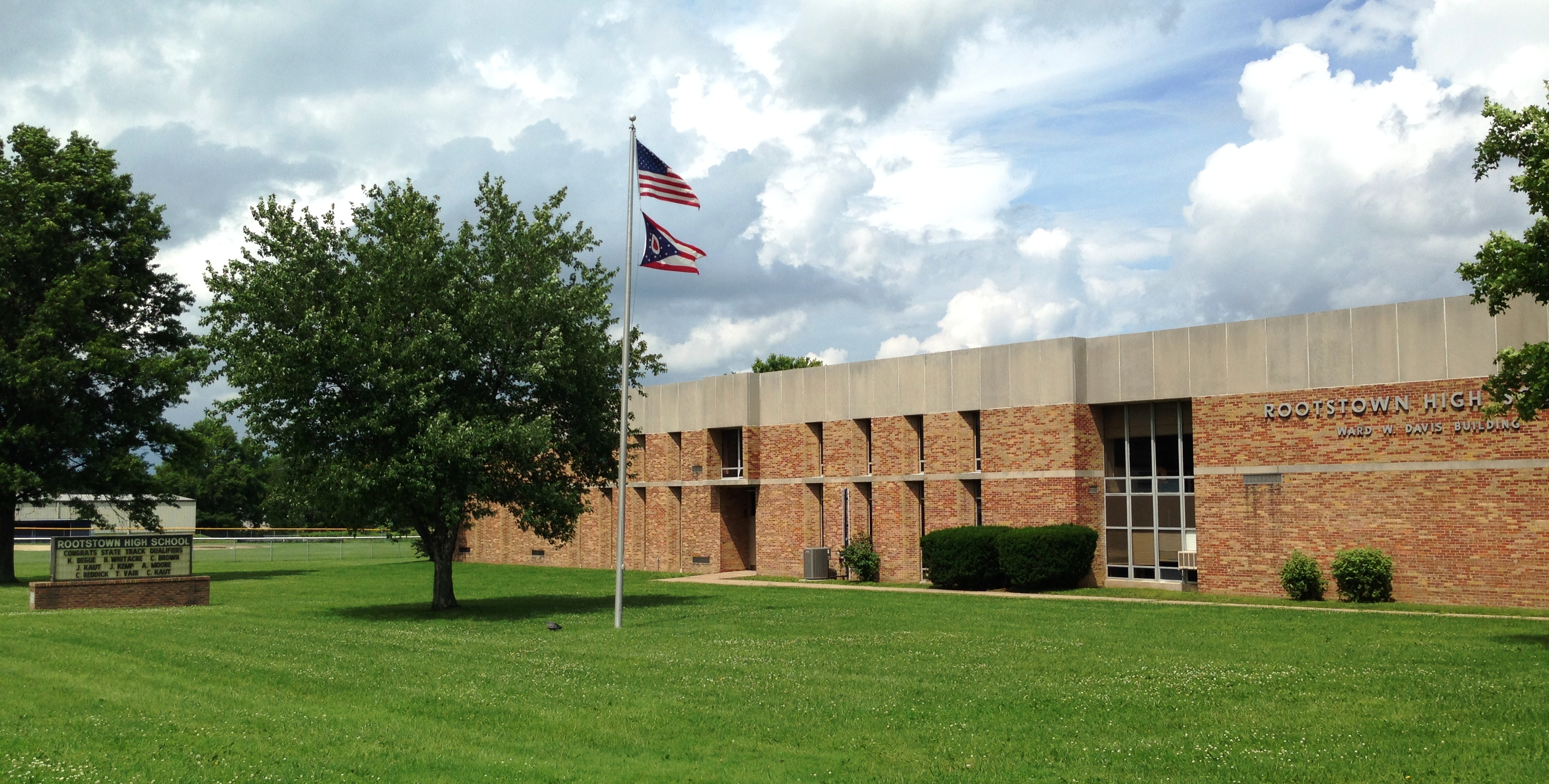
- Rootstown High School
- Coordinates: 41°6′38″N 81°14′32″W
- Country: United States
- State: Ohio
- County: Portage

Area
  - Total: 27.2 sq mi (70 km^{2})
  - Land: 26.5 sq mi (69 km^{2})
  - Water: 0.7 sq mi (1.8 km^{2})
- Elevation: 1,066 ft (325 m)

Population (2020)
  - Total: 8,602
  - Density: 324.6/sq mi (125.3/km^{2})
- Time zone: UTC-5 (Eastern (EST))
  - Summer (DST): UTC-4 (EDT)
- ZIP code: 44272
- Area codes: 330, 234
- FIPS code: 39-68392
- GNIS feature ID: 1086838
- Website: www.rootstowntwp.com

Rootstown Township is one of the eighteen civil townships of Portage County, Ohio, United States. The 2020 census found 8,602 people in the township.

== Geography ==
Located in the southwestern part of the county, it borders the following townships:

- Ravenna Township - north
- Charlestown Township - northeast corner
- Edinburg Township - east
- Atwater Township - southeast corner
- Randolph Township - south
- Suffield Township - southwest corner
- Brimfield Township - west
- Franklin Township - northwest corner

No municipalities are located in Rootstown Township.

Formed from the Connecticut Western Reserve, Rootstown Township covers an area of 26.4 sq mi (68 km^{2}).

== History ==
Rootstown is the only Rootstown Township statewide and is named for Ephraim Root, a native of Coventry, Connecticut, who was a lawyer and investor in the Connecticut Land Company. He was the proprietor of the township as well as several other properties in the Connecticut Western Reserve. Root first visited the township in 1800 and his brother David was the first settler, moving to Rootstown in 1802. Rootstown was originally surveyed from the Western Reserve as survey township Town 2, Range 8 and was formally organized as a civil township in 1810 after previously having been part of Franklin Township. In 1821 the Rootstown Post Office was established. It continues today under the ZIP Code Rootstown, OH 44272 and serves much of the township. In 1832, many German immigrants came who were farmers, stonemasons and carpenters. A plague in 1845 took 49 victims, including the town's only physician, Dr. Andrew Basset. In 1850 a band of 16 whaling sea captains from Nantucket bought land, built large homes and became farmers. Nelson Converse opened the first general store in 1853 in the center of town. In 1866 the Central and Pacific Railroad was built through the northeastern part of the township.

Electricity brought modern conveniences to the area in 1921, and street lights to both Rootstown and New Milford in 1949. 27 men formed the volunteer fire company in 1938. Its equipment was housed in the basement of the town hall until a new building was constructed by volunteer work and community fundraiser carnivals in 1955–1956. The department constructed a new building in 2002 adjacent to the former at the intersection of Tallmadge Road and SR 44. It opened during the bicentennial weekend; the previous fire station was razed.

The first religious body established in Rootstown was the Rootstown Congregational Church in 1810 and they were followed by the Methodist Church in 1815. St. Peter of the Fields Catholic Church was established in 1868 and Grace Church of Rootstown (formerly New Milford Baptist) in 1948. In 1961, a Ward of the Church of Jesus Christ of Latter-day Saints that serves southern Portage County was relocated to Rootstown.

== Government ==
The township is governed by a three-member board of trustees, who are elected in November of odd-numbered years to a four-year term beginning on the following January 1. Two are elected in the year after the presidential election and one is elected in the year before it. There is also an elected township fiscal officer, who serves a four-year term beginning on April 1 of the year after the election, which is held in November of the year before the presidential election. Vacancies in the fiscal officership or on the board of trustees are filled by the remaining trustees. As of 2024, the three incumbent Trustees are Joe Paulus (Term expires 12/31/27), Dave McIntyre (Term Expires 12/31/25), and Brett Housley (Term Expires 12/31/25).

=== Town hall ===
The Rootstown Town Hall was built in 1809 and remains in use today. It first received electricity in 1921 and indoor plumbing in 1963. In 1999 the township zoning board began using the basement of the town hall to store accumulated files and records. Today, it is located along SR 44 just south of the town center.

== Public services ==
=== Transportation ===
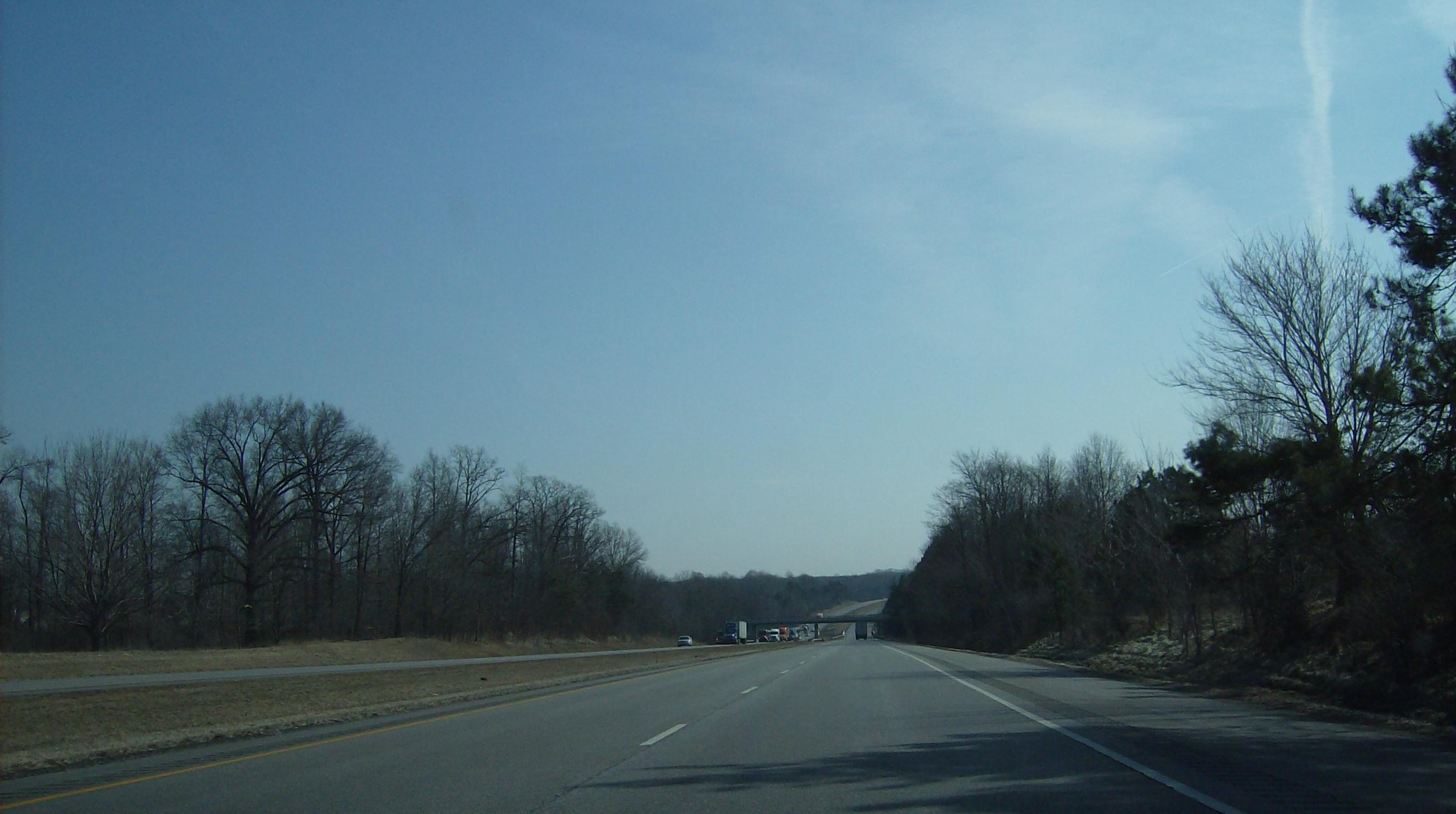
In Rootstown Township, Interstate 76 passes through many wooded hills

Several highways pass through Rootstown Township—SR 5, SR 44, and I-76. Public transportation is provided by the Portage Area Regional Transportation Authority (PARTA), which provides routes to Kent, Ravenna, and other parts of Portage County.

=== Education ===
Rootstown Township is served by the Rootstown Local School District, which includes an elementary school for grades Pre-K–5, a middle school for grades 6–8, and Rootstown High School for grades 9–12. All three schools are located on a central campus on State Route 44 just north of the town center. Across the street from the Rootstown Schools campus is the campus of Northeast Ohio Medical University (NEOMED). NEOMED is a medical, pharmacy, and dental school with an enrollment of approximately 1,000 students. The NEOMED campus is also home to Bio-Med Science Academy, a science, technology, engineering, math, and medical (STEM+M) academy for students from Portage County and the surrounding area in grades K–12. Grades 7–12 are housed in Rootstown, while lower grades meet at campuses in Ravenna and Shalersville.

=== Cemeteries ===
There are three cemeteries in Rootstown Township: the Old Cemetery, St. Peter of the Fields Cemetery, and Homeland Cemetery.

==== Old Cemetery ====
The first death in Rootstown Township was on August 31, 1808, with the death of 51-year-old Nathan Chapman, Sr. This cemetery was used until 1897 when a fire destroyed the township records. The last known burial at the Old Cemetery was in 1999.

==== St. Peter of the Fields Cemetery ====
- Established in 1867 with the first burial, this cemetery was dedicated holy ground for the Catholics of the parish of St. Peter of the Fields Church.
- The Old Section started in 1867, the Sacred Heart in 1941, and the Holy Angels, the newest section named in 2002, made up the resting grounds. A shrine and altar were built in 1941 and were re-built larger in 2001 to accommodate mass celebration there.
- A new church was established in 2006.

==== Homeland Cemetery ====
- Land was purchased and cleared for the new cemetery around 1890.
- The shrubs along the front were planted in 1950.
- In 2001–2002 Rootstown Township developed more land into burial plots and put the cemetery records on computer discs.

== People ==
- Jessica Eye, professional mixed martial artist; lived in Rootstown
- Brian McClure, professional football player in the National Football League (NFL); grew up in Rootstown
- Harvey Buel Spelman, state legislator in the Ohio House of Representatives; born in Rootstown
- Heidi Workman, state legislator in the Ohio House of Representatives; resident of Rootstown

== See also ==
- Triangle Lake Bog State Nature Preserve
