= Rootstown Local School District =

School district in Ohio, United States

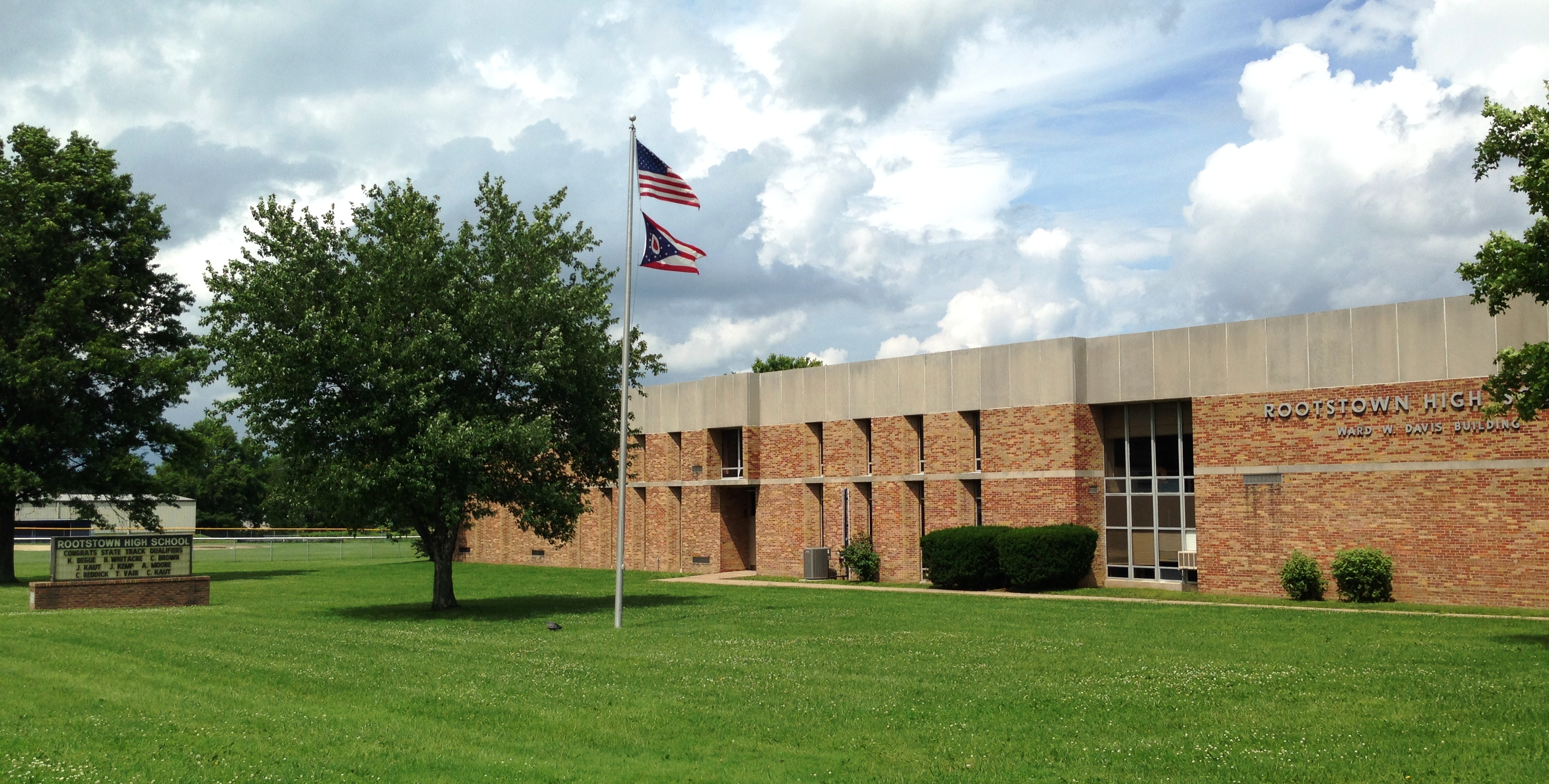
- Front view of high school as seen from Ohio State Route 44

Address
- 4140 State Route 44 Rootstown, Ohio, 44272; United States

District information
- Type: Public
- Grades: K-12
- Schools: 3
- NCES District ID: 3904921

Students and staff
- Students: 917 (2024–2025)
- Teachers: 62.00 (on an FTE basis) (2024–2025)
- Staff: 171.00 (on an FTE basis) (2024–2025)
- Student–teacher ratio: 14.79 (2024–2025)
- Colors: Navy blue, White

Other information
- Website: www.roversk12.org

The Rootstown Local School District is a secondary school district located in Rootstown, Ohio, United States. The district serves approximately 1,300 students in Rootstown Township in Portage County and has three schools: Rootstown Elementary School serving grades K-5, Rootstown Middle School serving grades 6–8, and Rootstown High School serving grades 9–12. All three schools are located on a central campus along SR 44 between I-76 and Tallmadge Road, just north of the Rootstown town center. Each building is named in honor of a past prominent member of the Rootstown Schools.
Additionally, Rootstown Schools participate in the post-secondary program allowing high school students to take college courses while still in high school and are part of the Maplewood Joint Vocational School in Ravenna with several other Portage County districts. The Rootstown Local School District was rated "excellent" by the Ohio State Board of Education in 2006, the board's highest rating for school districts.

== Rootstown Elementary School ==
Rootstown Elementary School, named in honor of Bertha Bradshaw, opened in 1958. Additional classrooms were added in 1959 and 1961, and the cafeteria was opened in 1966. The school serves over 550 students in grades K-5.

== Rootstown Middle School ==
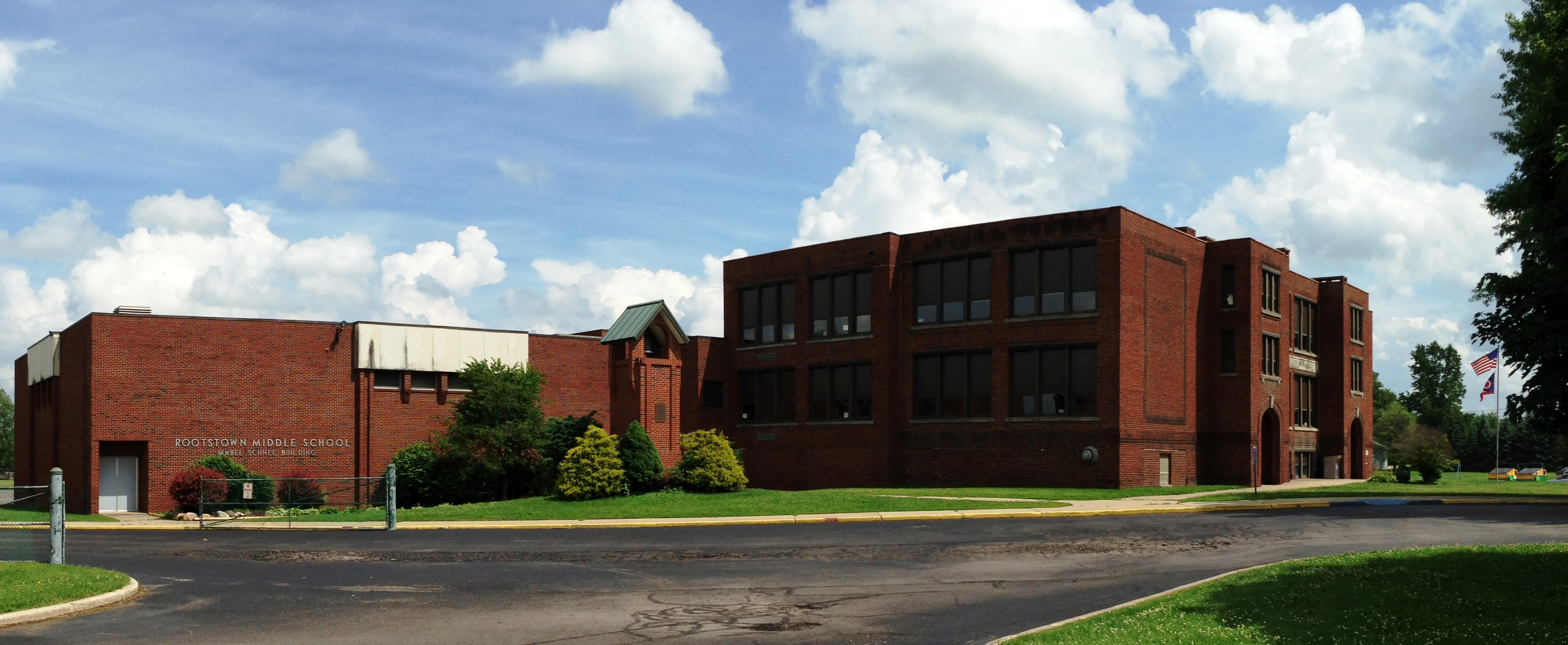
Rootstown Middle School

Rootstown Middle School is housed in the original Rootstown Township School, which opened in 1917. The building, named in honor of Mabel Schnee, is located on the south end of the campus and served as the home of all grades until the opening of the neighboring elementary school in 1958 and served as the high school until the current high school opened in 1966. Several additions have been made to the building over the years including: a gymnasium and additional classrooms in 1939; An industrial arts classroom along with more classrooms in 1950; as well as additions in 1954 and 1977. In 1998, a bell tower was constructed adjacent to the middle school and dedicated in honor of Dorothy Dundon. The Board of Education had originally purchased the bell in 1884 for about $60 and restored it when the bell tower was constructed. The district announced in April 2026 that it plans to close Rootstown Middle School no later than the 2029–30 school year, with sixth graders going to the elementary school and seventh and eighth graders being transferred into the high school.

== Rootstown High School ==
The current Rootstown High School building, named in honor of Ward W. Davis, opened in 1966.

== Notable students ==
- Brian McClure (Class of 1982), professional football player in the National Football League (NFL).
- Jessica Eye, UFC fighter
