= C. Forrest Faison III =

Military officer

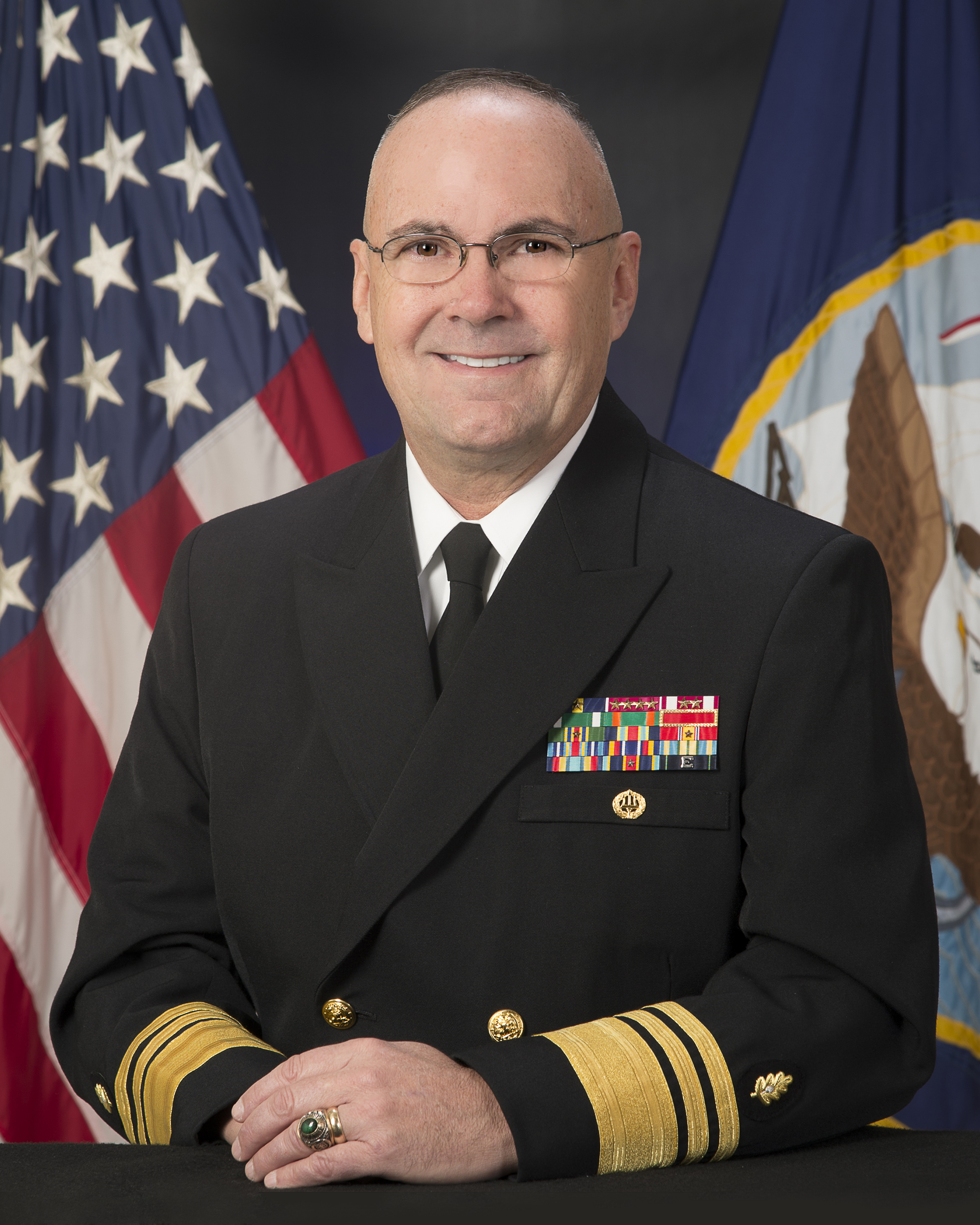
- Vice Admiral C. Forrest Faison, III
- Born: May 24, 1958 (age 67); Norfolk, Virginia, US
- Allegiance: United States
- Branch: United States Navy
- Service years: 1980–2019
- Rank: Vice Admiral
- Commands: Surgeon General of the United States Navy
- Awards: Distinguished Service Medal (2); Legion of Merit (6); Meritorious Service Medal (3)

Clinton Forrest Faison III (born May 24, 1958) is a retired vice admiral (VADM) in the United States Navy. He served as an officer in the Medical Corps and as the 38th Surgeon General of the United States Navy, and is currently the interim Provost of Northeast Ohio Medical University.

== Education ==
Faison spent time growing up in Norfolk, Virginia and Cleveland, Ohio. He graduated high school in the Cleveland suburbs, from Rocky River High School in 1976, where one of his classmates was future journalist Martin Savidge. He then attended Wake Forest University where he earned a bachelor's degree in 1980. Upon graduation, he received a commission as a naval officer through the Uniformed Services University of the Health Sciences (USUHS). This is where he completed his medical degree in 1984. He would go on to complete his post graduate training at Naval Hospital San Diego in pediatrics and a fellowship training at the University of Washington in neurodevelopmental pediatrics.

== Career ==
=== Military career ===
In 2006, Faison became the commanding officer of U.S. Medical Task Force, Kuwait. He was in command of the expeditionary medical facility, where he oversaw healthcare operations for Kuwait, Qatar, and southern Iraq. In addition, he also oversaw all medical logistics support through U.S. Central Command. Upon his return in 2007, Faison took over command of Naval Hospital Camp Pendleton. Not only overseeing operations at the hospital, he would also direct operations at all area branch health clinics on the base and surrounding areas.

In 2009, Faison served as Deputy Chief, Bureau of Medicine and Surgery (BUMED), for Current and Future Health Care Operations. All strategies and protocols regarding Naval Medical Treatment Facilities and operations would be under his responsibility. To include the relief effort in the Republic of Haiti, after a 7.0 magnitude earthquake devastated the country in 2010. He coordinated Navy Medicine's response and sent the hospital ship, USNS Comfort (T-AH 20), fully staffed and prepared, within five days of the earthquake to aid in relief efforts.

Faison would go on to take command of Navy Medicine West and Naval Medical Center San Diego in 2010. Here he would be responsible for 10 hospitals and over 30 clinics, as well as 16,000 staff on the west coast. He would launch multiple different programs that would improve health and fleet readiness, while also decreasing healthcare costs. This would lead him to receiving California's Medical Community's Lighthouse Award for visionary leadership and inspiring health innovation. This would mark the first time a member of the Department of Defense would receive this award. He would also coordinate the U.S. Navy's medical response for Operation Tomodachi, after a 9.0 magnitude earthquake tore through eastern Japan. This triggered a tsunami to crash through the northeastern Honshu coast, flooding the Fukushima Dai-ichi Nuclear Power Plant, leaving more than 20,000 dead or missing.

In 2013 Faison became Deputy Surgeon General of the Navy and on December 25, 2015, he would be appointed the 38th Surgeon General of the Navy. Under his leadership, Navy Medicine began to shift its focus of treatment from a facility-based care model to operational readiness. Investing more in operational medical platforms, such as enhancing Fleet and Marine Corps unit integration.

Early commands held by Faison after his commission include; Amphibious Group 3; USS Texas (CGN 39); Naval Hospital Lemoore; U.S. Naval Hospital, Yokosuka, Japan; Chief Information Officer, Navy Medicine; Director of DoD Telemedicine, Washington D.C.; Group Surgeon, 3rd Force Service Support Group, Fleet Marine Forces, Pacific; and Deputy Commander, Naval Medical Center, Portsmouth, Virginia.

=== Academic career ===
In 2023, Faison was appointed the interim Provost of Northeast Ohio Medical University.

== Memberships and awards ==
Faison's personal awards include the Navy Distinguished Service Medal (two awards), Legion of Merit (six awards), Meritorious Service Medal (three awards), Navy and Marine Corps commendation Medal, and Navy and Marine Corps Achievement Medal. He is also the recipient of the California Medical Community's Lighthouse Award for visionary leadership and inspiring health innovation, as well as the Japanese Maritime Self-Defense Force Commendation Medal.

Faison is a board-certified pediatrician. He is an associate clinical professor in pediatrics and distinguished professor of military medicine at Uniformed Services University of the Health Sciences. He is also a guest lecturer at Harvard Business School, in addition to being a senior member of the American Associates for Physician Leadership. In 2018, Faison was conferred an honorary Doctor of Science degree by his alma mater Wake Forest University.

== See also ==
- Medical Corps (U.S. Navy)
