= Tina A. Davidson =

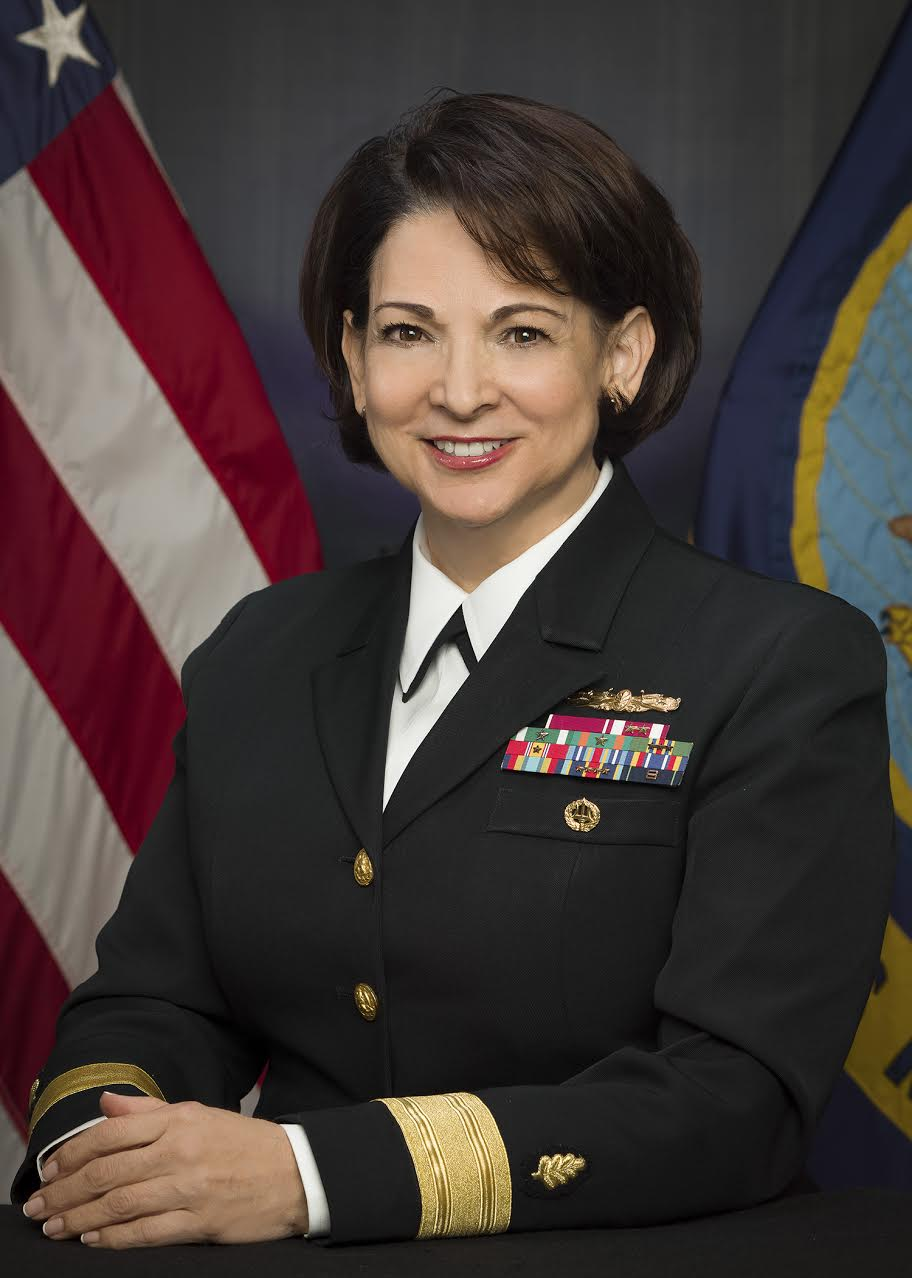
- Born: 1960 (age 65–66)
- Military career
- Allegiance: United States
- Branch: United States Navy
- Service years: 1986–2020
- Rank: Rear Admiral
- Commands: United States Navy Nurse Corps; Navy Medicine Education, Training and Logistics Command; Naval Health Clinic New England

Tina Ann Davidson (born 1960) is a retired rear admiral in the United States Navy, and Commander, of Navy Medicine Education, Training and Logistics Command, from 2018 to 2020. She is a fellow in the American College of Healthcare Executives (FACHE).

Raised in St. Louis, Missouri, Davidson graduated from Benedictine College with a B.A. degree in biology and from St. Louis University with a B.S. degree in nursing. She later earned an M.S. degree in nursing from The Catholic University of America and an M.A. degree in health services management from Webster University. Davidson also holds a doctorate in nursing practice from Rush University.

In 2017, she held a town hall. In 2020, she retired.

Military offices
Preceded by Rebecca J. McCormick-Boyle	Director, United States Navy Nurse Corps; 2017–2020	Succeeded by Cynthia A. Kuehner
