= Brian McClure =

American football player (born 1963)

No. 13
- Position: Quarterback

Personal information
- Born: December 28, 1963 (age 62); Ravenna, Ohio, U.S.
- Listed height: 6 ft 6 in (1.98 m)
- Listed weight: 222 lb (101 kg)

Career information
- High school: Rootstown (Rootstown Township, Ohio)
- College: Bowling Green
- NFL draft: 1986: 12th round, 313th overall pick

Career history
- Buffalo Bills (1987)

Awards and highlights
- Sammy Baugh Trophy (1985); 3× MAC Offensive Player of the Year (1983–1985); 2× MAC Most Valuable Player (1984, 1985); 4× First-team All-MAC (1982–1985); MAC Freshman of the Year (1982)

Career NFL statistics
- Passing attempts: 38
- Passing completions: 20
- Completion percentage: 52.6%
- TD–INT: 0–3
- Passing yards: 181
- Passer rating: 32.9
- Stats at Pro Football Reference

Brian McClure (born December 28, 1963) is an American former professional football player who was a quarterback for the Buffalo Bills of the National Football League (NFL). He played college football for the Bowling Green Falcons.

== College career ==
McClure played for the Falcons from 1982 to 1985, where he set numerous offensive records. His 900 completions and 10,280 yards passing are both school records. He also threw 63 touchdowns which was the school record until Omar Jacobs threw 71 from 2003 to 2005. In 1985, he led the Falcons to an undefeated regular season, but lost to Fresno State in the California Raisin Bowl.

- 1982: 113/176 for 1,391 yards with 8 TD vs 13 INT.
- 1983: 298/466 for 3,264 yards with 16 TD vs 16 INT.
- 1984: 263/414 for 2,951 yards with 21 TD vs 13 INT.
- 1985: 226/371 for 2,674 yards with 18 TD vs 16 INT.

=== Statistics ===
Season	Team	Games			Passing								Rushing			
Season	Team	GP	GS	Record	Cmp	Att	Pct	Yds	Y/A	TD	Int	Rtg	Att	Yds	Avg	TD
1982	Bowling Green	9	7	5–2	113	176	64.2	1,391	7.4	8	13	130.8	37	–63	–1.7	1
1983	Bowling Green	11	11	8–3	298	466	63.9	3,264	7.0	16	16	127.2	72	–255	–3.5	1
1984	Bowling Green	11	11	8–3	263	414	63.5	2,951	7.1	21	13	133.9	52	–99	–1.9	2
1985	Bowling Green	11	11	11–0	226	371	60.9	2,674	7.2	18	16	128.8	42	–89	–2.1	0
Regular season		42	40	32–8	900	1,427	63.1	10,280	7.2	63	58	130.0	203	−506	−2.5	4
Bowl games		2	2	0–2	44	74	59.5	500	6.7	2	4	66.2	15	−82	−6.1	0
Career		44	42	32–10	944	1,501	62.8	10,780	7.1	65	62	81.6	218	−588	−2.7	4

Bowl games only began counting toward single-season and career statistics in 2002.

- 1982 California Bowl – 22/32, 246 yards, 2 TD, Int. Six rushes for (-22)
- 1985 California Bowl – 22/42, 254 yards, 3 Int. Nine rushes for (-60)

== NFL replacement player ==
McClure was drafted 313th overall in the 12th round of the 1986 NFL draft by the Buffalo Bills. The arrival of Jim Kelly from the United States Football League pushed him to fourth string on the team's depth chart (behind Kelly, Frank Reich and Art Schlichter), and he was cut along with Schlichter prior to the start of the regular season after injuring his hand in the final preseason game. He was again cut by the Bills in training camp in 1987, but a got a chance to play after all when Buffalo signed him as a replacement player during that year's players strike.

After two weeks of replacement games (both losses, in which Buffalo scored a total of 13 points) and mediocre performances by quarterbacks Dan Manucci and Willie Totten, the Bills named McClure their starting quarterback for the October 18 contest against the New York Giants in Buffalo. McClure's task would be extra difficult, as future Hall of Famer Lawrence Taylor crossed the picket line to re-join the Giants; he would get two sacks and numerous hits on the replacement QB. The game turned out to be a defensive struggle: neither team scored until New York kicked a field goal early in the fourth quarter. McClure was not helping much, throwing three interceptions. Late in the game, though, Buffalo drove down to the Giants 14, then Todd Schlopy kicked a field goal to tie it and force overtime. In the OT, McClure again drove the Bills down the field, this time to the 10-yard-line; Schlopy won the game with another field goal. The quarterback would be placed on injured reserve the following week—after four days spent primarily in the whirlpool—with what he called "total body-ache". He was one of the few replacement players not cut immediately when the strike was over.

Among players who appeared in only one NFL game, McClure's 20 completions, 38 attempts and 181 passing yards remain all-time records.

== After football ==
Brian McClure would move back to Cleveland with his wife, get a job in the public works department, coach youth football and start a family. His older son, Kade, was selected in the sixth round of the 2017 MLB draft by the Chicago White Sox after three years with the University of Louisville where he compiled a 21–5 record. Kade McClure has pitched seven seasons in the minors as of 2024; he is currently with the Class AA Altoona Curve in the Pittsburgh Pirates system.

== Honors ==
- MAC Freshman of the Year 1982
- MAC Offensive Player of the Year 1983,1984,1985
- MAC Most Valuable Player 1984,1985
- Sammy Baugh Trophy 1985
- Inducted in the Bowling Green Hall of Fame in 1991
