= Naval Medical Center San Diego =

Coordinates: 32°43′30″N 117°08′45″W

- Active: 1917–present
- Country: United States
- Branch: United States Navy
- Type: Hospital
- Part of: Navy Medicine West, Bureau of Medicine and Surgery
- Motto: The Pride of Navy Medicine

Naval Medical Center San Diego (NMCSD) is a United States Navy hospital in San Diego, California. It is also known as Bob Wilson Naval Hospital and informally referred to as "Balboa Hospital", and "The Pink Palace", due to the stucco of the first buildings that were constructed being pinkish in color.

== Development ==
As the United States entered World War I, San Diegans offered the nearly empty Balboa Park after the 1915 Panama–California Exposition to be used by various branches of the U.S. military for barracks and training purposes. During this time, a hospital tent was set up at the present location of the San Diego Natural History Museum. In September 1919, city leaders set aside a 17-acre (6.9 ha) parcel at Inspiration Point in Balboa Park for use in constructing a permanent Naval hospital. About $1.25 million was appropriated for the construction of the hospital; which would supplement the medical services provided aboard a fleet assigned hospital ship. This donation, along with other purchased land, allowed for the development of an 85-acre (34 ha), 89-building complex with 2,600 beds. The first unit opened in 1925.

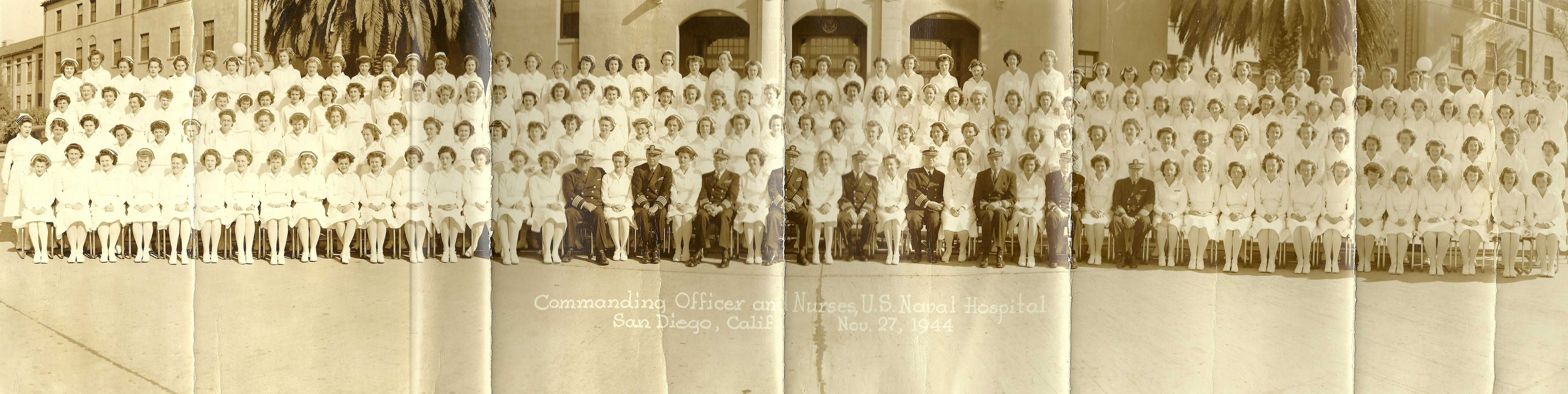
USN Hospital San Diego, 1944

During World War II, due to large numbers of casualties coming from the Pacific Theater of Operations, the hospital expanded to include most of the buildings in present-day Balboa Park. For instance, the Navy Nurses were housed at the House of Hospitality and the California Building, Fine Arts Gallery and the San Diego Natural History Museum were converted into hospital wards. The Lily Pond was used for swim training, the Japanese Tea Garden as a Red Cross Servicemen's Center, the House of Pacific Relations as officers' quarters and the Palisades as a Hospital Corps School named Camp Kidd. The Balboa Complex, to include the main Naval Hospital, treated approximately 172,000 patients with a maximum occupancy of 12,000 in December, 1944. In 1946 the Balboa Park grounds and buildings were returned to the city.

During the Vietnam War-era, the complex was the largest military hospital in the world.

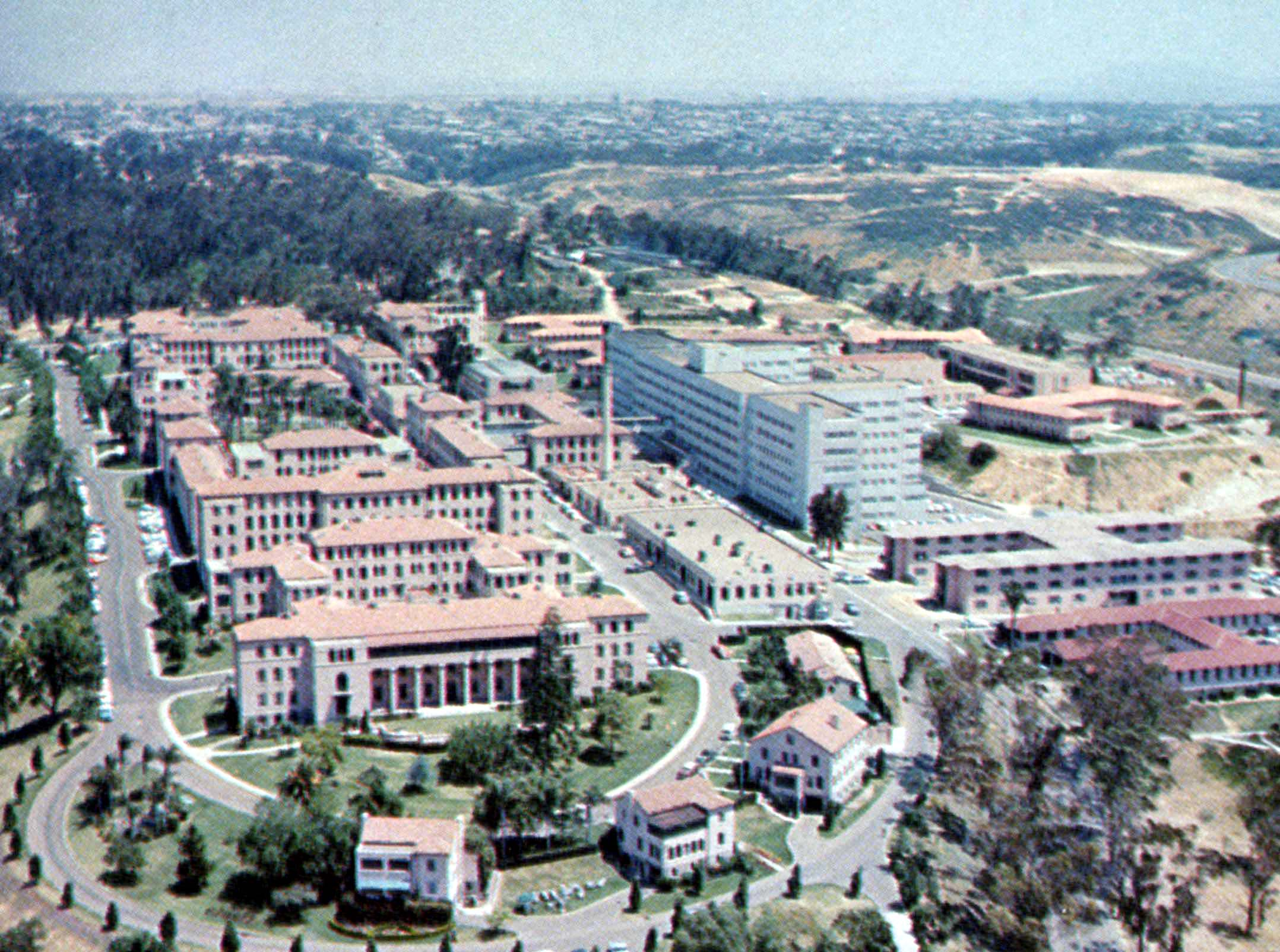
Aerial view of the Naval Medical Center San Diego as seen in the 1950s

An entirely new $270 million hospital complex was built in Florida Canyon, north of the original hospital, during the mid-1980s; the site was chosen at the urging of then-U.S. Representative Bob Wilson, after whom the new hospital complex was subsequently named. It officially opened in January 1988. A 39-acre (16 ha) portion of the original site was returned to the city of San Diego and restored to Park use.

== Current status ==
The center has five medical mobilization teams including the hospital ship USNS Mercy (T-AH-19) whose personnel are drawn from the hospital staff. These teams deploy to the Western Pacific and Southeast Asia at various times during the year.

The hospital is a major training facility associated with the Uniformed Services University of Health Sciences. The hospital is affiliated with the University of California, San Diego, Children's Hospital and Health Center, Scripps Research in La Jolla and other institutions where Navy trainees perform rotations as integral parts of their residency or fellowship programs. The hospital also maintains a school on the grounds for training enlisted medical personnel.

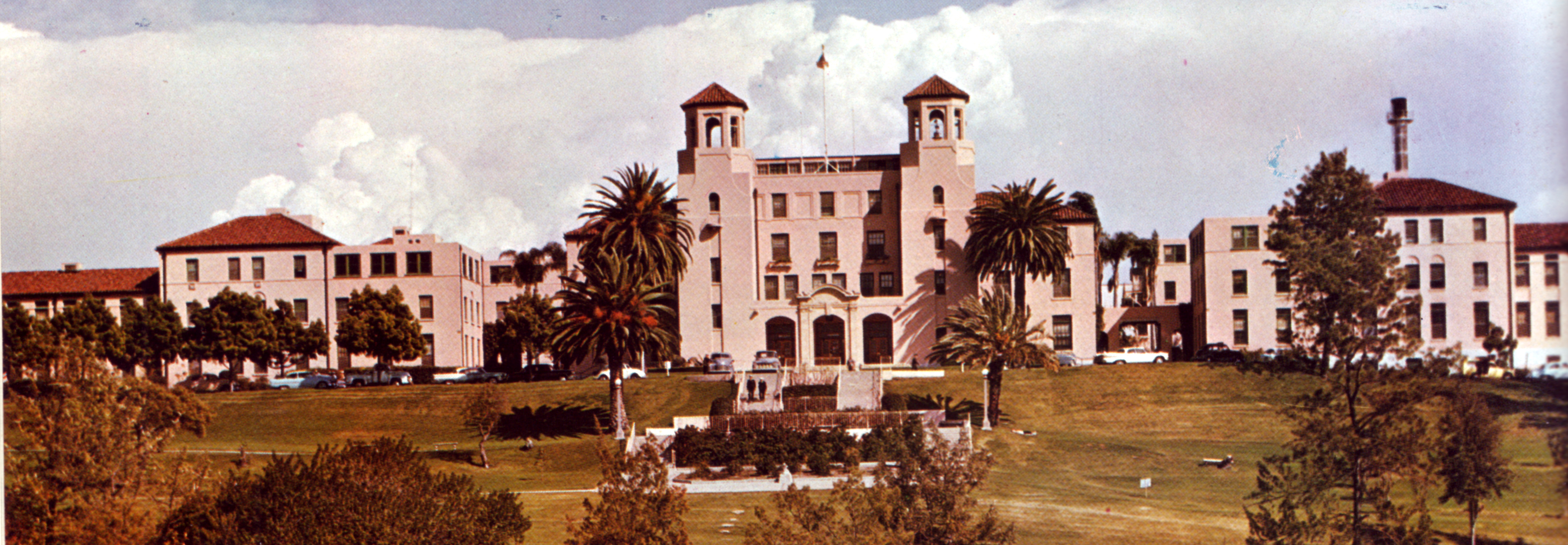
The hospital's administration building, built in the 1920s, was designed in the Spanish Colonial Revival style

The hospital operates clinics at area military installations, where ambulatory care is provided to the active duty population. Nine other clinics are located in San Diego and are available to family members and retirees.

== Research and testing ==
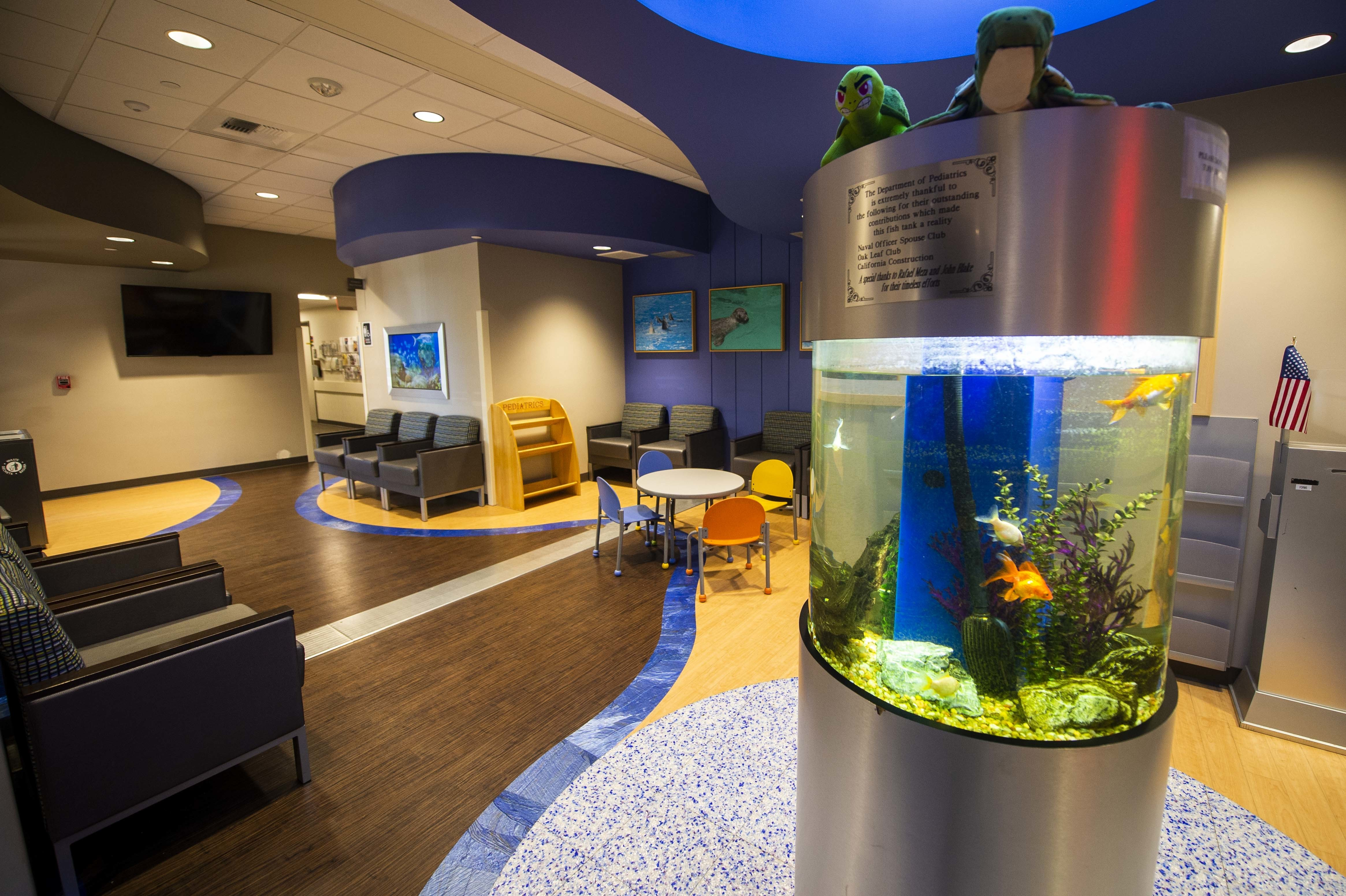
A picture of the pediatrics department at the hospital

A leader in the medical field, the hospital is also a major teaching and research center.

As one of Navy medicine's active teaching hospital, graduate medical education programs are conducted in anesthesiology, dermatology, emergency medicine, general surgery, internal medicine, obstetrics and gynaecology, ophthalmology, otolaryngology, orthopedics, pathology, pediatrics, psychiatry, psychology, radiology, urology, general practice dentistry, oral and maxillofacial surgery, nurse anesthesia, and hospital pharmacy.

== Namesake ==
On May 8, 2008, the hospital Medical Center San Diego was dedicated to San Diego Congressman Bob Wilson. The main entrance road leading to the hospital grounds is also named for him, Bob Wilson Drive.

== Bibliography ==
- Christman, Florence (1985). The Romance of Balboa Park (4th ed.). San Diego: San Diego Historical Society. ISBN 0-918740-03-7.
- Linder, Bruce (2001). San Diego's Navy. Annapolis, Maryland: Naval Institute Press. ISBN 1-55750-531-4.
