= William Whelan =

William, Bill, or Billy Whelan may refer to:

- William Whelan (surgeon) (1808–1865), Chief of the US Bureau of Medicine and Surgery
- W. J. Whelan (union leader) (1887–1960), Irish union leader
- Billy Whelan (Scottish footballer) (1906–1982), Scottish footballer
- William Joseph Whelan (1924–2021), American biochemist, Fellow of the Royal Society
- Billy Whelan (1935–1958), Irish footballer
- Bill Whelan (born 1950), Irish musician
