= Union navy =

United States Navy during the American Civil War

United States Navy
- Naval jack of the United States (1859–1861) at the start of the U.S. Civil War
- Founded: October 13, 1775
- Country: United States
- Type: Navy
- Role: Sea control Maritime security
- Size: 84,415 personnel 671 vessels
- Part of: Department of the Navy
- Motto: "Semper Fortis" (English: "Always Courageous" (official))
- Colors: Blue and gold
- Anniversaries: 13 October

Commanders
- Commander-in-Chief: President Abraham Lincoln
- Secretary of the Navy: Gideon Welles
- Admiral in Chief: David Farragut

The Union navy is used to describe the United States Navy (USN) during the American Civil War, when it fought the Confederate States Navy (CSN). The term is sometimes used to describe vessels of war used on the rivers of the interior under the control of the Union army.

== Wartime missions ==
The primary missions of the Union navy were:

1. Maintain the blockade of Confederate ports by restraining all blockade runners; declared by President Lincoln on April 19, 1861, and continued until the end of the Rebellion.
2. Meet in combat the war vessels of the CSN.
3. Carry the war to places in the seceded states inaccessible to the Union army but could be reached by water.
4. Support the Army by providing gunfire support, rapid transport, and communications on the interior rivers.

== Administrative organization ==
The system of naval bureaus was revised in the summer of 1862. Some of the older bureaus were rearranged or had their names altered. The most radical change was the creation of the Bureau of Steam Engineering.

Department of the Navy

- Secretary of the Navy, Gideon Welles
- Assistant Secretary, Gustavus Vasa Fox
  - Bureau of Yards and Docks
    - Bureau Chief, Joseph Smith
  - Bureau of Equipment and Recruiting
    - Bureau Chief, Andrew H. Foote, Albert N. Smith
  - Bureau of Navigation (United States Navy)
    - Bureau Chief, Charles H. Davis
  - Bureau of Ordnance
    - Bureau Chief, John A. Dahlgren, Henry A. Wise
  - Bureau of Construction and Repair
    - Bureau Chief, John Lenthall
  - Bureau of Steam Engineering
    - Bureau Chief, Benjamin F. Isherwood
  - Bureau of Provisions and Clothing
    - Bureau Chief, Horatio Bridge
  - Bureau of Medicine and Surgery
    - Bureau Chief, William Whelan

== Transformation ==
To accomplish its wartime missions, the Union navy had to undergo a profound technical and institutional transformation. During the war, sailing vessels were completely supplanted by ships propelled by steam for combat purposes. Vessels of widely differing character were built from the keel up in response to peculiar problems they would encounter. Wooden hulls were first protected by armor plating and soon replaced by iron or steel throughout. Guns were reduced in number but increased in size and range; the reduction was partially compensated by mounting the guns in rotating turrets or pivoting the gun on a curved deck track so they could be turned to fire in any direction.

The institutional changes that were introduced during the war were equally significant. The Bureau of Steam Engineering was added to the bureau system, testimony to the U.S. Navy's conversion from sail to steam. Most important, from the standpoint of Army-Navy cooperation in joint operations, the set of officer ranks was redefined so that each rank in the U.S. Army had its equivalent in the U.S. Navy. Establishing the ranks of admirals also implied a change of naval doctrine, from one favoring single-ship operations to that of employing whole fleets.

A doctrinal shift took place at the same time. Before the war, the United States Navy emphasized single-ship operations, but the nature of the conflict soon made whole fleets necessary. Already at the Battle of Port Royal (November 7, 1861), 77 vessels, including 19 warships, were employed. This was the largest naval expedition ever sailed under the U.S. flag, but the record did not last long. Subsequent operations at New Orleans, Mobile, and several positions in the interior confirmed the importance of large fleets in modern naval operations.

== Ships ==
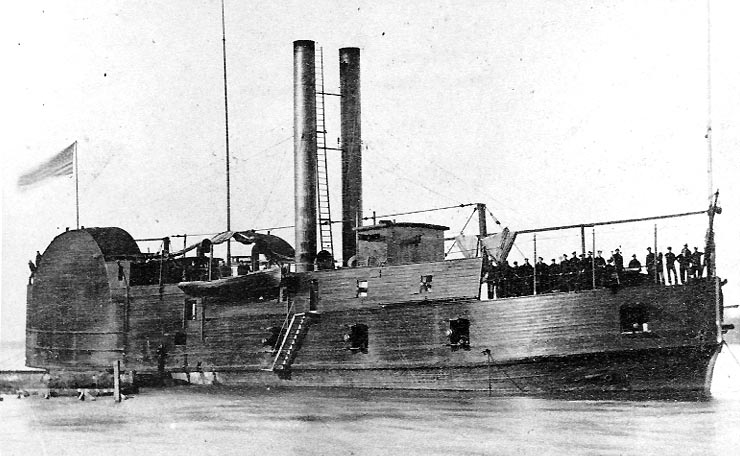
USS Conestoga, a converted gunboat that served on the Mississippi River.

At the start of the war, the Union navy had 42 ships in commission. Another 48 were laid up and listed as available for service as soon as crews could be assembled and trained, but few were appropriate. Most were sailing vessels, some were hopelessly outdated, and one (USS Michigan) served on Lake Erie and could not be moved to the ocean. During the war, the number in commission was increased by more than a factor 15, so that at the end the U.S. Navy had 671 vessels.

A 13-Star Navy flag with an odd star pattern and unusual number of stripes (c. 1861–1865)

The variety of ship types represented was even more significant than the increase in raw numbers, some of the forms not previously seen in naval war. The nature of the conflict, much of which occurred in the continent's interior or shallow harbors along the coast, meant that vessels designed for use on the open seas were less useful than more specialized ships. To confront the forms of combat that came about, the federal government developed a new type of warship, the monitor, based on the original, USS Monitor. The U.S. Navy took over a class of armored river gunboats created for the U.S. Army but designed by naval personnel, the Eads gunboats. So-called double-enders were produced to maneuver in the confined waters of the rivers and harbors. The Union navy experimented with submarines before the Confederacy produced its famed CSS Hunley; the result, USS Alligator, failed primarily because of lack of suitable targets. Building on Confederate designs, the Union navy produced and used torpedo boats, small vessels that mounted spar torpedoes and were forerunners of both the modern torpedo and destroyer type of warship.

Because of haste in their design and construction, most of the vessels taken into the U.S. Navy in this period of rapid expansion incorporated flaws that would make them unsuitable for use in a permanent defense system. Accordingly, at the war's end, most of them were soon stricken from the service rather than mothballed. The number of ships at sea fell back to its prewar level.

== Personnel ==
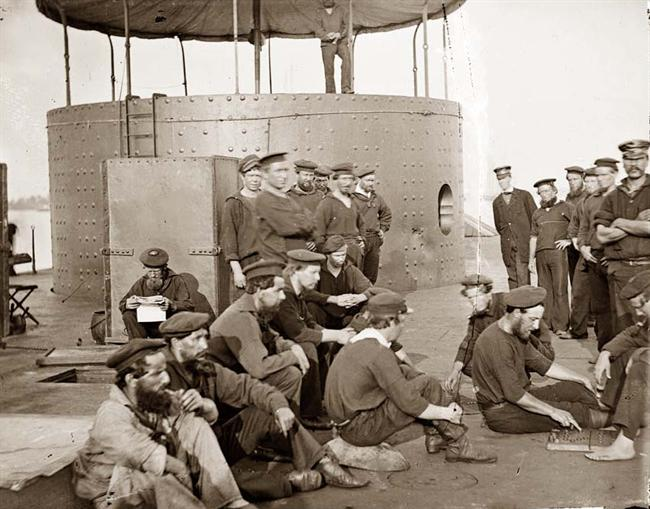
Part of the crew of USS Monitor, after her encounter with CSS Virginia (ex-USS Merrimack)

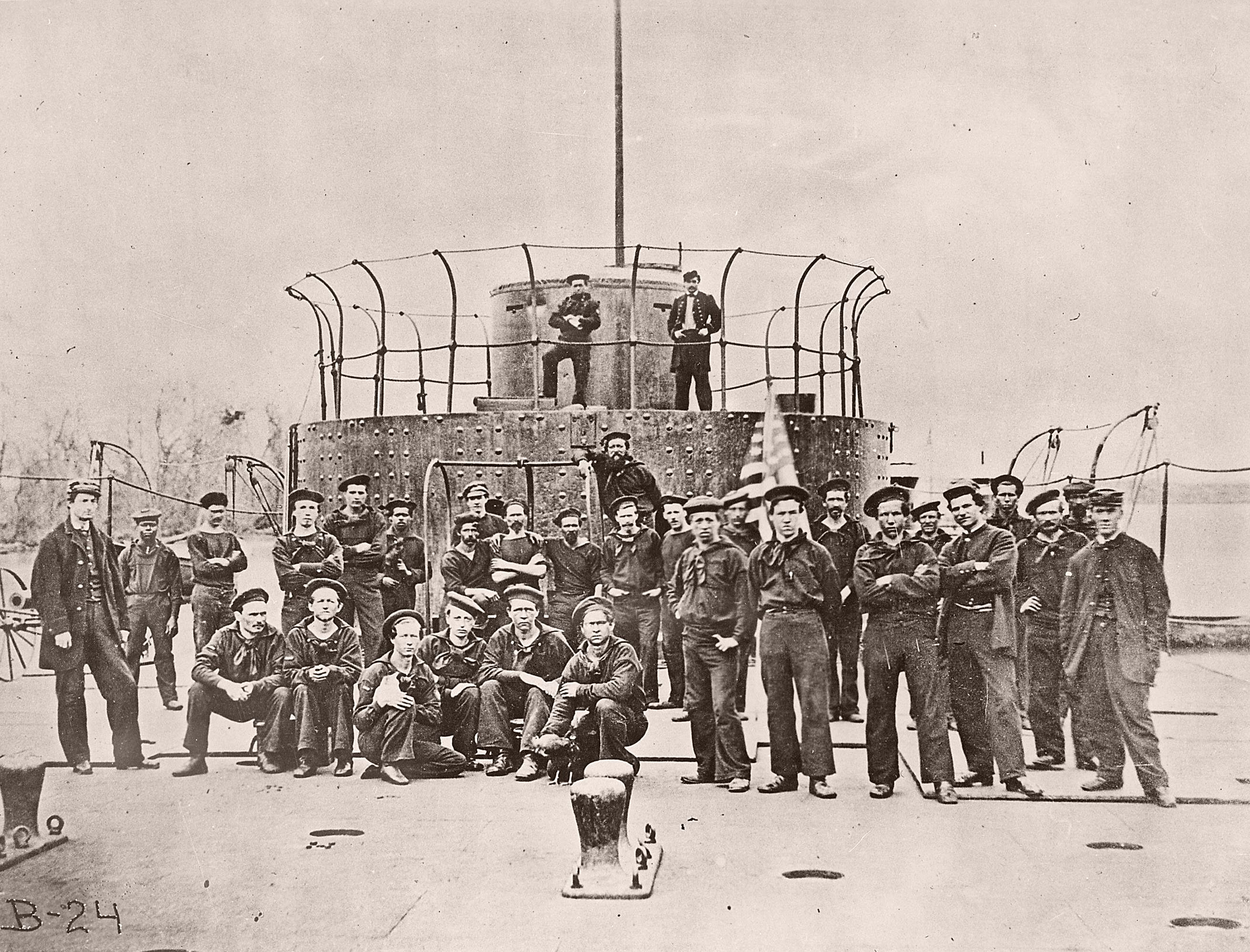
Crewmen of USS Lehigh in 1864 or 1865.

During the war, the Union navy had a total of 84,415 personnel. The Union navy suffered 6,233 casualties, with 4,523 deaths from all causes. 2,112 Union sailors were killed by enemy action, and 2,411 died by disease or injury. The Union navy suffered at least 1,710 personnel wounded in action, injured, or disabled by disease. The Union navy started the war with 8,000 men, 7,600 enlisted men of all ratings and some 1,200 commissioned officers. The number of hands in the Union navy grew five times its original strength at the war's outbreak. As with many pre-war sailors, most of these new hands were volunteers who desired to serve in the navy temporarily rather than make the navy a career. Most of these volunteers were rated as "Land's Men" by recruiters meaning they had little or no experience at sea in their civilian lives. However, many sailors from the United States pre-war merchant marine joined the navy, and they were often given higher ratings due to their background and experience. A key part of the Union navy's recruiting efforts was the offer of higher pay than a volunteer for the Union army would receive and the promise of greater freedom or the opportunity to see more of the country and world. When the Draft was introduced, the Navy tried to recruit volunteers by offering service at sea as a better-paying alternative to being drafted into the Army; this incentive was especially meant to attract professional sailors who could be drafted the same as any other civilian and would rather see combat in an environment they were more familiar with.

=== Sailors ===
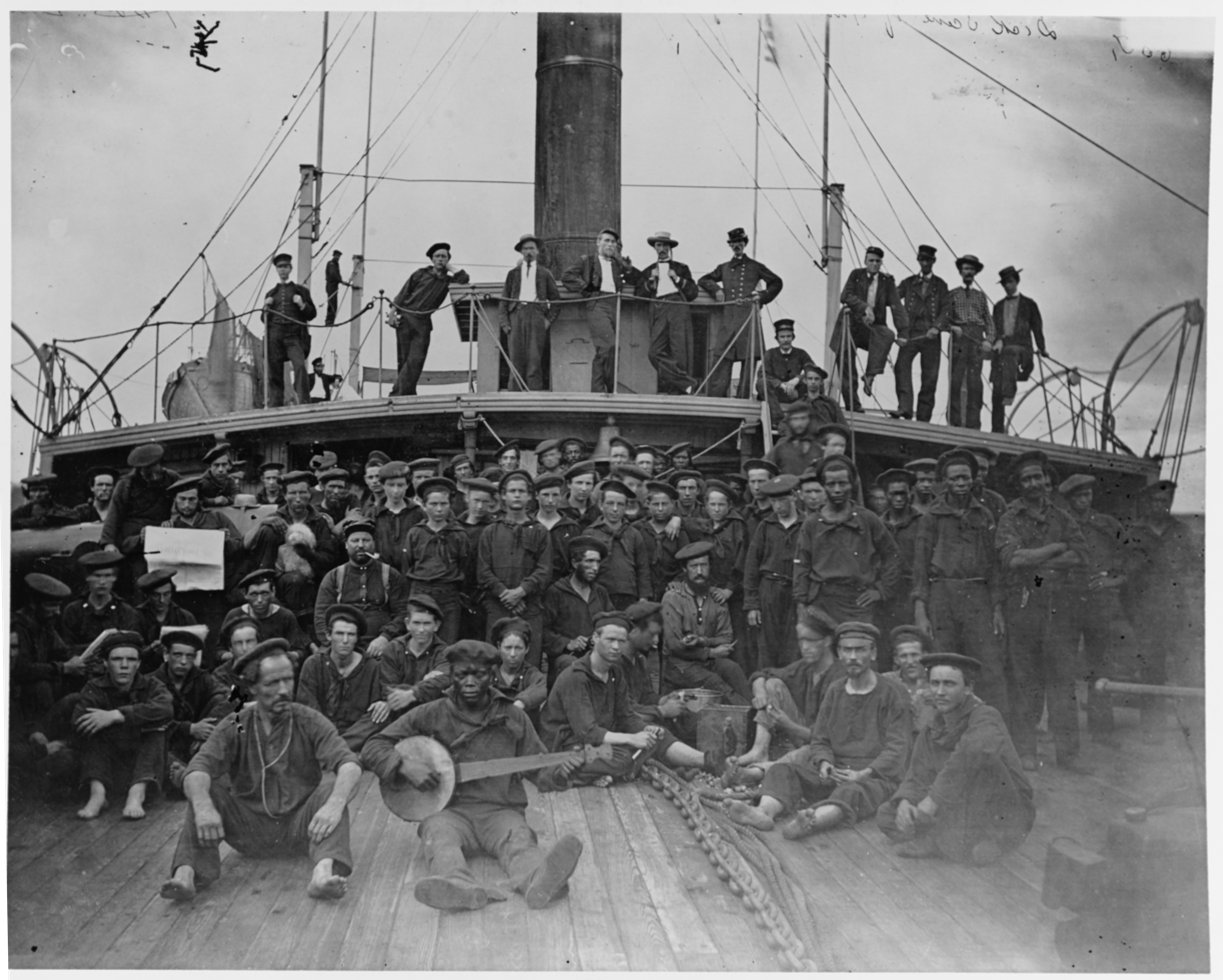
U.S. sailors from USS Hunchback on the James River; approximately a fifth of the sailors in the photograph are black men. Nearly 10,000 sailors of the Union navy in the American Civil War were black, with seven of them being awarded the Medal of Honor.

Union sailors differed from their counterparts on land, soldiers. The sailors were typically unemployed, working-class men from urban areas, including recent immigrants. Unlike soldiers, few were farmers. They seldom enlisted to preserve the Union, end slavery, or display their courage; instead, many were coerced into joining. According to Michael Bennett:

The typical Union sailor was a hard, pragmatic, and cynical man who bore little patience for patriotism, reform, and religion. He drank too much, fought too much, and prayed too little. He preferred adventure to stability and went for quick and lucrative jobs rather than steady and slow employ under the tightening strictures of the new market economy. He was rough, dirty, and profane. Out of date before his time, he was aggressively masculine in a Northern society bent on gentling men. Overall, Union sailors proved less committed to emerging Northern values and were less ideological than soldiers for whom the broader issues of freedom, market success, and constitutional government proved constant touchstones during the war.

Nevertheless, Union navy sailors and marines were awarded 325 Medals of Honor for Civil War valor, with immigrants receiving 39 percent of the awards: Ireland (50), England (25), and Scotland (13).

Before the Civil War, the U.S. Navy had never prohibited African Americans from serving. However, regulations in place since 1840 had required them to be limited to no more than 5% of all enlisted personnel. Thus unlike the army, the Union navy did not prohibit African Americans from serving at the start of the war and was racially integrated. Approximately 10,000, or around 17%, of Union navy sailors were black; seven of them were awarded the Medal of Honor. The tension between white and "contraband" (black) sailors was high and remained serious during the war. Bennett argues:

For the most part, white sailors rejected contrabands as sailors. They did so owing to a tangled mix of racial prejudices, unflattering stereotypes that equated sailors with enslaved people, and working-class people's fears of blacks as labor competition. The combination of all of these tensions eventually triggered a social war—referred to as "frictions" by sailors—as whites racially harassed, sometimes violently, formerly enslaved people serving alongside them.

== Blockade ==
The blockade of all ports in the seceded states was proclaimed by President Abraham Lincoln on April 19, 1861, one of the first acts of his administration following the bombardment of Fort Sumter. It existed mostly on paper in the early days of the conflict but became increasingly tighter as it continued. Although the blockade was never perfect, Southern exports of cotton fell 95 percent. As a result, the South had to restructure itself to emphasize food and munition production for internal use. This also contributed to the Confederacy's isolation and hastened its currency's devaluation.

For administration of the blockade, the Navy was divided into four squadrons: the North Atlantic, South Atlantic, East Gulf, and West Gulf Blockading Squadrons. (A fifth squadron, the Mississippi River Squadron, was created in late 1862 to operate in the Vicksburg campaign and its consequences; it was not involved with the blockade.)

== Invasion ==
"The Splendid Naval Triumph on the Mississippi, April 24th, 1862" (Currier and Ives lithograph)

Two early invasions of the South were meant primarily to improve the blockade, leading to further actions. Following the capture of Cape Hatteras, much of eastern North Carolina was soon occupied by the Union army. The easy success in North Carolina was not repeated after the seizure of Port Royal in South Carolina, as determined resistance prevented the significant expansion of the beachhead there. Charleston did not fall until the last days of the war. The later capture of Fernandina, Florida, was intended from the start to provide a southern anchor for the Atlantic blockade. It led to the capture of Jacksonville and the southern sounds of Georgia, but this was not part of a larger scheme of conquest. It reflected mostly a decision by the Confederate government to retire from the coast, except for a few major ports. Late in the war, Mobile Bay was taken by fleet action, but there was no immediate attempt to take Mobile itself.

The capture of New Orleans was only marginally connected with the blockade, as New Orleans was already well sealed off. However, it was important for several other reasons. The passage of the forts below the city by Farragut's fleet showed that fixed fortifications could not defend against a steam-powered fleet, so it was crucial for the emergence of the Navy as equal to the Army in national defense. It also demonstrated the possibility of attacking the Confederacy along the line of the Mississippi River. It thus was an important, even vital, predecessor of the campaign that ultimately split the Confederacy. Finally, it cast doubt on the ability of the Confederacy to defend itself, thus giving European nations reason not to grant diplomatic recognition.

The final important naval action of the war was the second assault on Fort Fisher at the mouth of the Cape Fear River in North Carolina. It was one of the few actions of the war on the coast in which the Army and Navy cooperated fully. The capture of the fort sealed off Wilmington, the last Confederate port to remain open. The death of the Confederacy followed in a little more than three months.

== Battles ==
=== Coastal and ocean ===
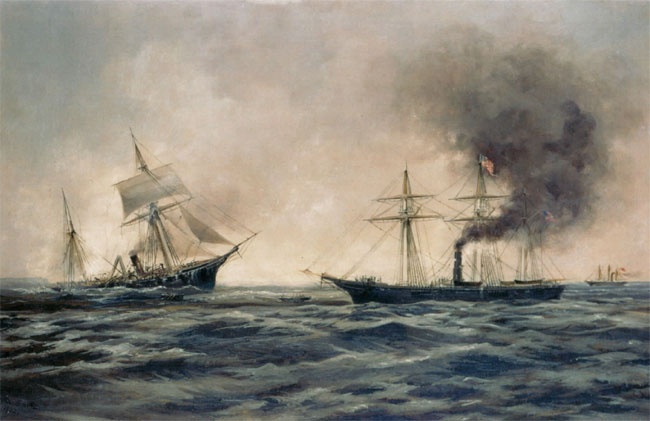
Encounter between USS Kearsarge and CSS Alabama, off the coast of Cherbourg, France, 19 June 1864.

Hatteras Inlet
Port Royal
Burnside Expedition: Battle of Roanoke Island

Battle of Elizabeth City
Battle of New Bern
Siege of Fort Macon

Hampton Roads
New Orleans (Forts Jackson and St. Philip)
Drewry's Bluff
Galveston Harbor
Charleston Harbor
Fort Wagner (Morris Island)
Albemarle Sound
Sinking of CSS Alabama by the USS Kearsarge
Mobile Bay
First Battle of Fort Fisher
Second Battle of Fort Fisher
Trent's Reach

There were numerous small or one-to-one battles far away from the coasts between ocean-going Union vessels and blockade runners, often in the Caribbean but also in the Atlantic, the Battle of Cherbourg being the most famous example.

=== Inland waters ===
Forts Henry and Donelson
Island No. 10
Plum Point Bend
Memphis
St. Charles, Arkansas (White River expedition)
Vicksburg campaign

Arkansas Post (Fort Hindman)
Yazoo Pass Expedition
Steele's Bayou Expedition
Battle of Grand Gulf

Red River expedition

Not included in this list are several incidents in which the Navy took part more or less incidentally. These include Shiloh and Malvern Hill. They are not on the list because naval personnel were not involved in planning or preparing for the battle.

== Ranks and rank insignia ==
The highest rank available to a U.S. naval officer when the war began was that of Commodore. This created problems when many ships had to operate together with no clearly established chain of command. Even worse, when the Navy worked with the Army in joint operations, the customary rank equivalency between the two services meant that the naval captain, equivalent to an army colonel, would always be inferior to every Army general present. After the existing arrangement had been used for the first year of the war, the case was made that the nation's interests would be better served by organizing the Navy along lines more like that of the British Royal Navy. A set of officer ranks was established in the summer of 1862 that precisely matched the Army ranks. The most visible change was that some individuals would be designated commodore, rear admiral, vice admiral, and finally admiral, all new formal ranks, and equivalent to, respectively, brigadier general, major general, lieutenant general, and general.

=== Commissioned officer ranks ===
The rank insignia of commissioned officers.

Rank	Vice admiral	Rear admiral	Commodore	Captain	Commander	Lieutenant commander	Lieutenant	Master	Ensign
March 1852
July 1862
Jan. 1864
Jan. 1865

=== Other ranks ===
The rank insignia of non-commissioned officers and enlisted personnel.

Rank	Passed midshipman	Midshipman	Boatswain/Gunner/ Carpenter/Sailmaker	Master's mate	Rated master's mate	Petty officer
March 1852
July 1862
Jan. 1864
Jan. 1865

==== Petty officers ====
Chief Petty Officer

Master-at-Arms of the ship he serves in.

Petty Officers of the Line

Rank and succession to command:

1. Boatswain's Mate
2. Gunner's Mate
3. Signal Quartermaster
4. Coxswain to Commander-in-Chief
5. Captain of Forecastle
6. Coxswain
7. Captain of Main-top
8. Captain of Fore-top
9. Captain of Mizzen-top
10. Captain of Afterguard
11. Quarter Gunner
12. 2nd Captain of Forecastle
13. 2nd Captain of Main-top
14. 2nd Captain of Fore-top
15. 2nd Captain of Mizzen-top

Petty Officers of the Staff

Rank next after Master-at-Arms:

1. Yeoman
2. Surgeon's Steward
3. Paymaster's Steward
4. Master of the Band
5. Schoolmaster
6. Ship's Writer

Rank next after Gunner's Mate:

1. Carpenter's Mate
2. Armorer
3. Sailmaker's Mate

Rank next after Captain of the Afterguard:

1. Painter
2. Cooper
3. Armorer's Mate

Rank next after Quarter-Gunner:

1. Ship's Corporal
2. Captain of the Hold
3. Ship's Cook
4. Baker

Enlisted Pay Ratings

1. Able Seaman (three years experience at sea and able to work aloft)
2. Seaman (one year experience at sea)
3. Landsman (no previous sea experience)

== See also ==
- History of the United States Navy
- Confederate States Navy
- American Civil War
- Blockade runners of the American Civil War
- Bibliography of American Civil War naval history
- Mississippi River in the American Civil War
