= Michael Cowan =

Michael Cowan may refer to:

- Michael Cowan (cricketer) (1933–2022), English cricketer
- Michael L. Cowan (1944–2023), American navy admiral
- Mike Cowan (born 1948), professional golf caddie on the PGA Tour
