= Braisted =

Braisted is a surname. Notable people with the surname include:

- John M. Braisted Jr. (1907–1997), American lawyer and politician
- William Clarence Braisted (1864–1941), American surgeon
