= Surgeon General of the United States Navy =

Most senior commissioned officer of the Medical Corps of the United States Navy

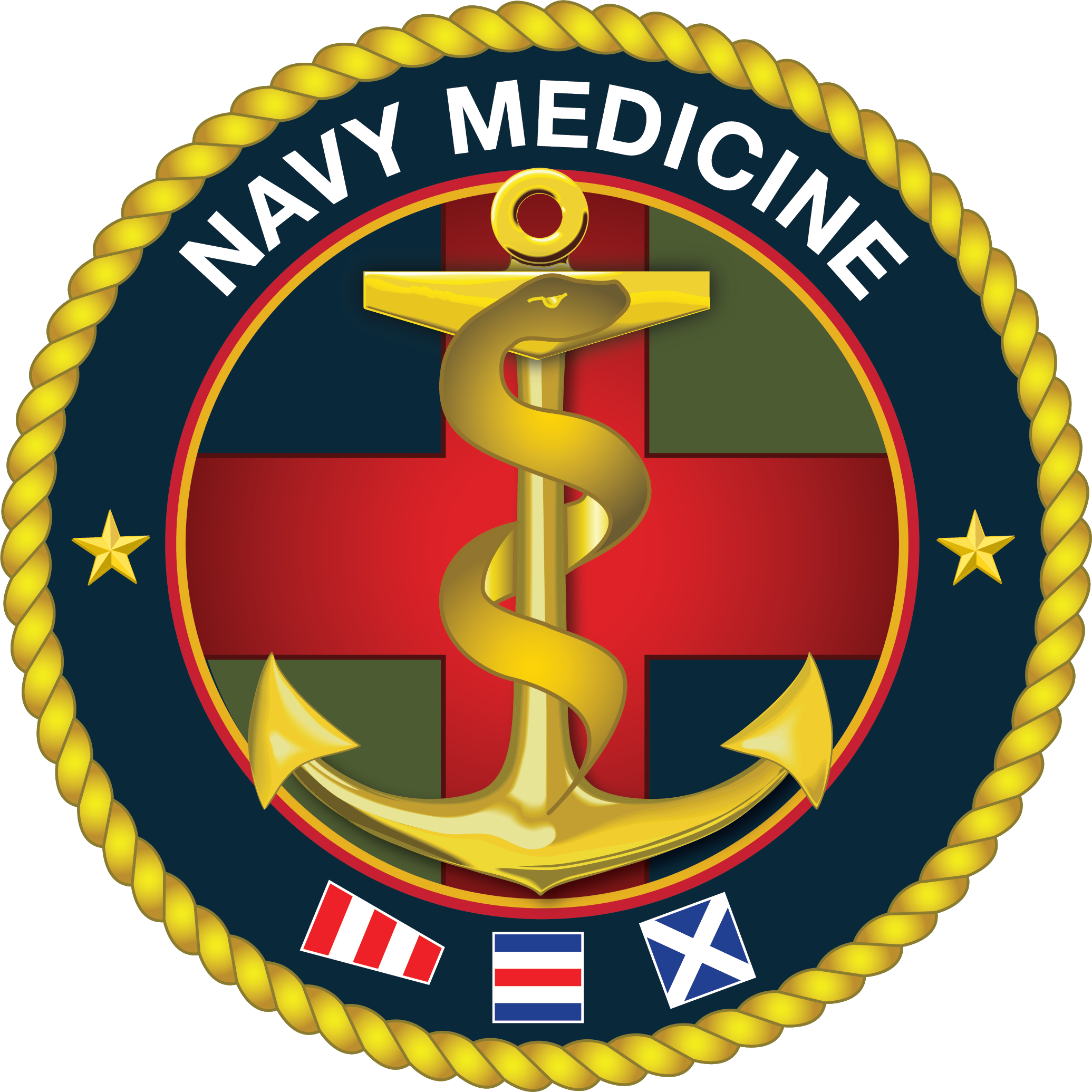
- Seal of the Bureau of Medicine and Surgery

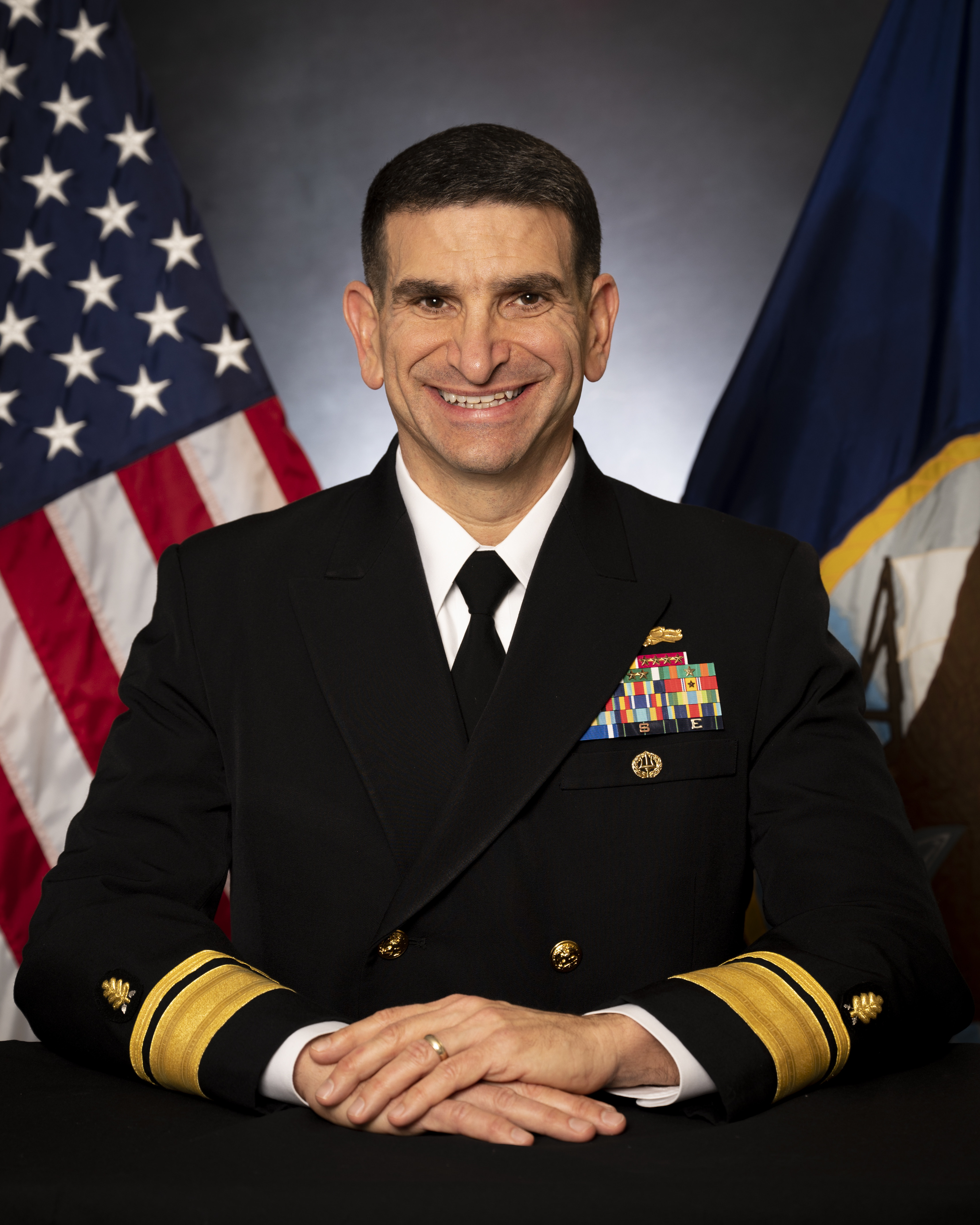
- Incumbent; RADM Darin K. Via; Acting since September 17, 2025
- Bureau of Medicine and Surgery; United States Navy Medical Corps
- Type: Head of the medical branch of the U.S. Navy and U.S. Marine Corps
- Abbreviation: SGN
- Member of: Office of the Chief of Naval Operations
- Reports to: Secretary of the Navy; Chief of Naval Operations; Commandant of the United States Marine Corps
- Residence: Suite 5113, 7700 Arlington Boulevard, Falls Church, Virginia
- Seat: Defense Health Headquarters, Falls Church, Virginia
- Appointer: The president with Senate advice and consent
- Term length: 4 years
- Constituting instrument: 10 U.S.C. § 8077
- Formation: 1869
- First holder: William Maxwell Wood
- Deputy: Deputy Surgeon General of the Navy/Deputy Chief, Bureau of Medicine and Surgery (Navy matters); Chief, Medical Corps/Medical Officer of the Marine Corps (Marine matters)
- Website: Official website

The surgeon general of the Navy (SGN) is the most senior commissioned officer of the Medical Corps of the United States Navy and is the principal advisor to the United States secretary of the navy, chief of naval operations and director of the defense health agency on all health and medical matters pertaining to the United States Navy and United States Marine Corps. As head of the Bureau of Medicine and Surgery, the surgeon general also manages Navy and Marine healthcare policy, administering the services' healthcare and biomedical research facilities as well as the various staff corps of BUMED, including the Medical Corps and an enlisted corps. The surgeon general is also a member of the Office of the Chief of Naval Operations.

From 1965 to 2019, the surgeon general was appointed as a vice admiral, until the National Defense Authorization Act for Fiscal Year 2017 struck the surgeon general's statutory rank. Currently the surgeon general of the Navy is the only uniformed service surgeon general to not be a three-star general or flag officer. There have been several attempts by the House of Representatives over the years to address the rank inequality but all have failed. The House version of the 2023, 2024, and 2025 NDAA each included a clause restoring the surgeon general's three-star rank, but the clause is removed when the Senate reconcilies their version of the NDAA with the House's. The closest acknowledgement from the Senate of the rank disparity came via the 2024 NDAA, when they attached a house report (H. Rept. 118-301) to it, acknowledging that the Navy does have the authority to allow the surgeon general to be designated a three-star rank, if an officer is nominated for appointment and confirmed.

== Establishment of the Bureau of Medicine and Surgery ==
On 31 August 1842, the United States Congress passed a Navy appropriation bill that was a blueprint for efficiency. The legislation provided for five Navy bureaus United States Navy bureau system to replace the outdated Board of Navy Commissioners—Yards and Docks; Construction, Equipment, and Repair; Provisions and Clothing; Ordnance and Hydrography; and Medicine and Surgery. Heading each of the bureaus was a "Chief" to be appointed by the President of the United States.

The Bureau of Medicine and Surgery (BUMED) became the central administrative headquarters for the Navy Medical Department, and those names became interchangeable. The general order of 26 November 1842, which defined the duties of the new bureaus, charged BUMED with:

- All medicines and medical stores of every description, used in the treatment of the sick, the diseased and the wounded;
- All boxes, vials, and other vessels containing the same;
- All clothing, beds, and bedding for the sick;
- All surgical instruments of every kind;
- The management of hospitals, so far as the patients therein are concerned;
- All appliances of every sort, used in surgical and medical practice;
- All contracts, accounts, and returns, relating to these and such other subjects as shall hereafter be assigned to this bureau.

Overseeing all of these duties, and directing the medical department, was the Chief of BUMED, William P. C. Barton. Barton served at this post until 1844. He was followed by Thomas Harris, William Whelan, Phineas Horwitz, and William Maxwell Wood. Since the days of Barton's directorship the most senior ranking physician in the Navy Medical Department has held the title of Chief of the Bureau of Medicine and Surgery.

== Creation of the title ==
On 3 March 1871, Congress passed legislation granting medical and other staff officers of the Navy "relative rank" with grades "equal to but not identical with the grades of the line." This Naval Appropriations Act went further than any previous Congressional action in transforming and enhancing the Navy Medical Department. The Chief of the Bureau of Medicine and Surgery now had the additional title "Surgeon General," with the relative rank of Commodore. At the helm of this "revitalized" organization stood the first Surgeon General, William Maxwell Wood (1809–1880), a man entering his 42nd year of a naval service as unusual and varied as could be. Wood had served aboard USS Poinsett, one of the first steam vessels of the Navy, and designated flagship during the "expedition for the suppression of Indian hostilities on the coast of Florida" (a.k.a. the Seminole Wars). Wood served shore duty at Sackets Harbor, New York, Baltimore, Maryland, had duty as Fleet Surgeon of the Pacific Fleet, and served under Commodore John D. Sloat in California during the Mexican–American War. However fitting he may have been as the first Navy Surgeon General, he served less than two years.

=== Chief of Bureau of Medicine and Surgery ===
Image	Name	Dates of Tenure
	William P. C. Barton	1842–1844
	Thomas Harris	1844–1853
	William Whelan	1853–1865
	Phineas J. Horwitz	1865–1869
	William Maxwell Wood	1869–1871

== List of chiefs of BUMED and surgeons general of the Navy ==
Image	Surgeon General	Date(s) of tenure
	CDRE William Maxwell Wood	1869–1871
	CDRE Jonathan M. Foltz	1871–1872
	CDRE James C. Palmer	1872–1873
	CDRE Joseph Beale	1873–1877
	CDRE William Grier	1877–1878
	CDRE J. Winthrop Taylor	1878–1879
	CDRE Philip S. Wales	1879–1884
	CDRE Francis M. Gunnell	1884–1888
	CDRE J. Mills Browne	1888–1893
	CDRE James R. Tryon	1893–1897
	CDRE Newton L. Bates	1897
	RADM William Knickerbocker Van Reypen	1897–1902
	RADM Presley Marion Rixey	1902–1910
	RADM Charles F. Stokes	1910–1914
	RADM William Clarence Braisted	1914–1920
	RADM Edward R. Stitt	1920–1928
	RADM Charles E. Riggs	1928–1933
	RADM Perceval S. Rossiter	1933–1938
	VADM Ross T. McIntire	1938–1946
	RADM Clifford A. Swanson	1946–1951
	RADM H. Lamont Pugh	1951–1955
	RADM Bartholomew W. Hogan	1955–1961
	RADM Edward C. Kenney	1961–1965
	VADM Robert B. Brown	1965–1969
	VADM George M. Davis	1969–1973
	VADM Donald L. Custis	1973–1976
	VADM Willard P. Arentzen	1976–1980
	VADM J. William Cox	1980–1983
	VADM Lewis H. Seaton	1983–1987
	VADM James A. Zimble	1987–1991
	VADM Donald F. Hagen	1991–1995
	VADM Harold M. Koenig	1995–1998
	VADM Richard A. Nelson	1998–2001
	VADM Michael L. Cowan	2001–2004
	VADM Donald Arthur	2004–2007
	VADM Adam M. Robinson Jr.	2007–2011
	VADM Matthew L. Nathan	2011–2015
	VADM C. Forrest Faison III	2015–2019
	RADM Bruce L. Gillingham	2019–2023
	RADM Darin K. Via	2023–2025
	RADM Rick Freedman (acting)	2025–present

== See also ==
- Surgeon General of the United States
- Surgeon General of the United States Army
- Surgeon General of the United States Air Force
