= Adam M. Robinson Jr. =

United States Navy vice admiral (born 1950)

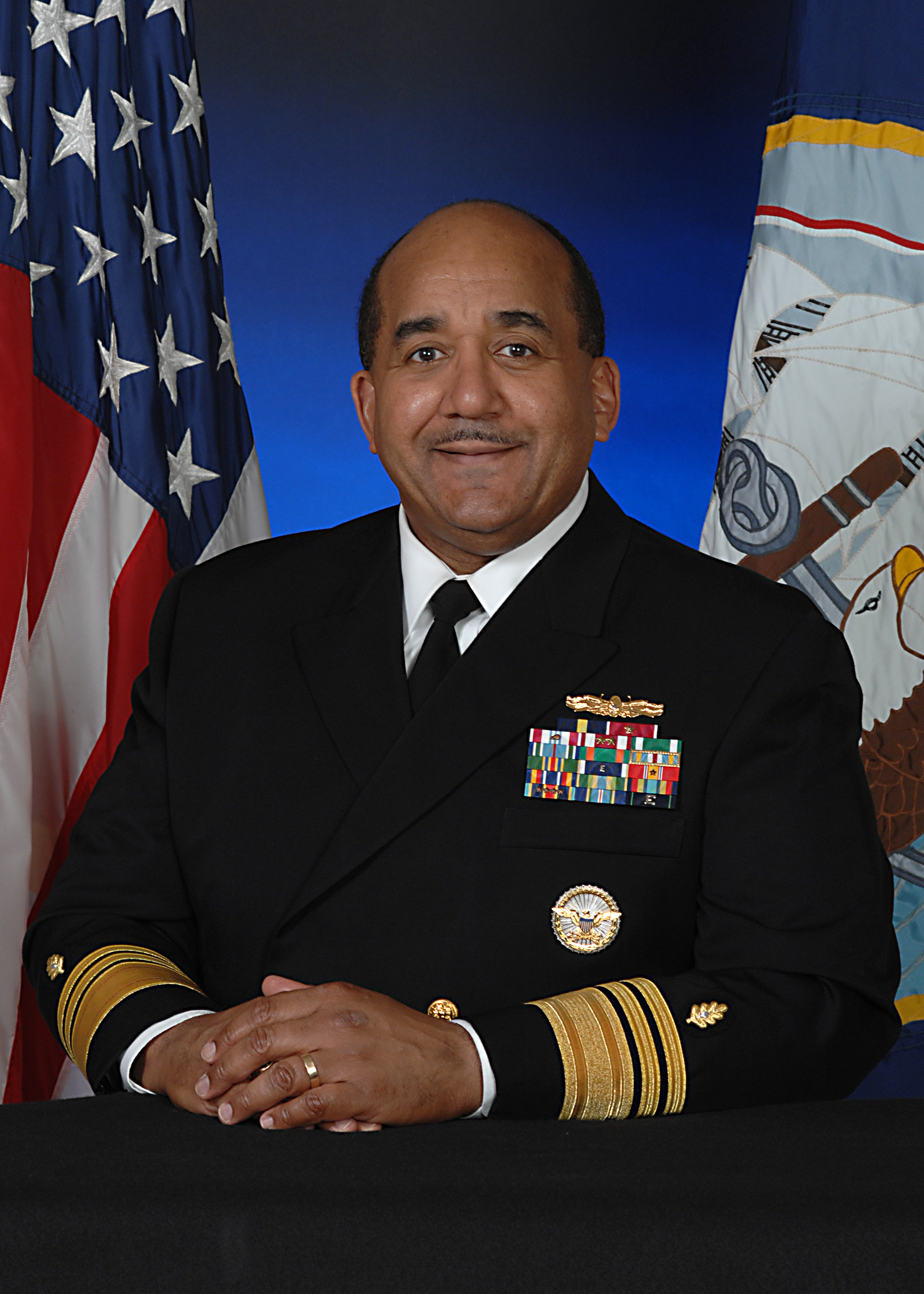
- Born: November 9, 1950 (age 75); Louisville, Kentucky
- Military career
- Allegiance: United States of America
- Branch: United States Navy
- Service years: 1977–2011
- Rank: Vice admiral
- Commands: Surgeon General of the United States Navy

Adam Mayfield Robinson Jr. (born November 9, 1950) is a United States Navy vice admiral who served as the 36th Surgeon General of the United States Navy (2007–2011).

== Biography ==
Robinson entered the naval service in 1977 and holds a Doctor of Medicine degree from the Indiana University School of Medicine, Indianapolis, through the Armed Forces Health Professions Scholarship Program. Following completion of his surgical internship at Southern Illinois University School of Medicine, Springfield, he was commissioned.

Robinson's first assignment was as a general medical officer, Branch Medical Clinic, Fort Allen, Puerto Rico, before reporting to the National Naval Medical Center, Bethesda, MD, in 1978 to complete a residency in General Surgery. His subsequent duty assignments included: staff surgeon, U.S. Naval Hospital, Yokosuka, Japan, and ship's surgeon, USS Midway (CV-41).

After completing a fellowship in colon and rectal surgery at Carle Foundation Hospital, University of Illinois School of Medicine (1984–85), Robinson reported to the National Naval Medical Center, Bethesda, as the head of the Colon and Rectal Surgery Division. While there, he was called to temporary duty in 1987 as ship's surgeon in USS John F. Kennedy (CV-67) and in 1988 as ship's surgeon in USS Coral Sea (CV-43).

Robinson reported to Naval Medical Center Portsmouth, Virginia, in 1990 as the head of the General Surgery Department and director of General Surgery Residency Program. He was appointed acting medical director for the facility in 1994. While at Naval Medical Center Portsmouth, Robinson earned a Master of Business Administration degree from the University of South Florida. In 1995, Robinson reported to the commander, Naval Surface Force, U.S. Atlantic Fleet, as the force medical officer, serving in that capacity for two years. Following that assignment, he reported to Naval Hospital Jacksonville in 1997 as the executive officer. In January 1999, as Fleet Hospital Jacksonville commanding officer, Robinson commanded a detachment of the fleet hospital as a medical contingent to Joint Task Force Haiti (Operation New Horizon/Uphold Democracy).

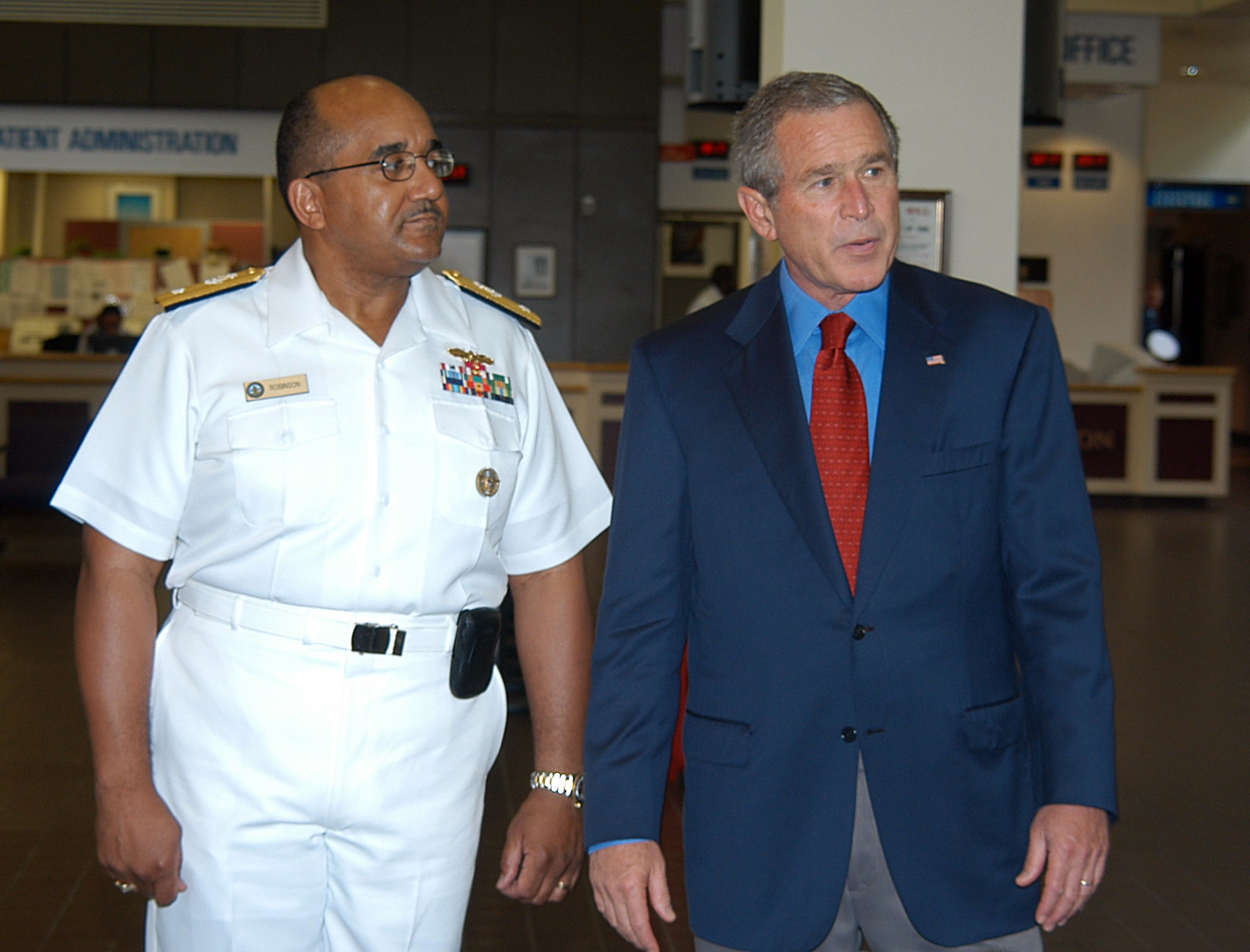
Robinson and President George W. Bush at the National Naval Medical Center in 2005

In August 1999, Robinson reported to the Bureau of Medicine and Surgery (BUMED) as the director of readiness and was selected as the principal director of clinical and program policy in the Office of the Assistant Secretary of Defense for Health Affairs in September 2000, where he also served as the acting deputy assistant secretary of defense for health affairs, clinical and program policy. Robinson was assigned as commanding officer of U.S. Naval Hospital Yokosuka from September 2001 to January 2004, after which he received assignment back to BUMED as deputy chief of BUMED for medical support operations with additional duty as acting chief of the Medical Corps. In July 2004, Robinson reported as commander of National Naval Medical Center Bethesda, Maryland. He assumed the duties as commander of Navy Medicine National Capital Area Region in October 2005.

The author of numerous presentations and publications, Robinson holds fellowships in the American College of Surgeons and the American Society of Colon and Rectal Surgery. He is a member of the Le Societe Internationale de Chirurgie, the Society of Black Academic Surgeons, and the National Business School Scholastic Society, Beta Gamma Sigma. He holds certification as a Certified Physician Executive from the American College of Physician Executives.

== Military awards ==
U.S. Military decorations

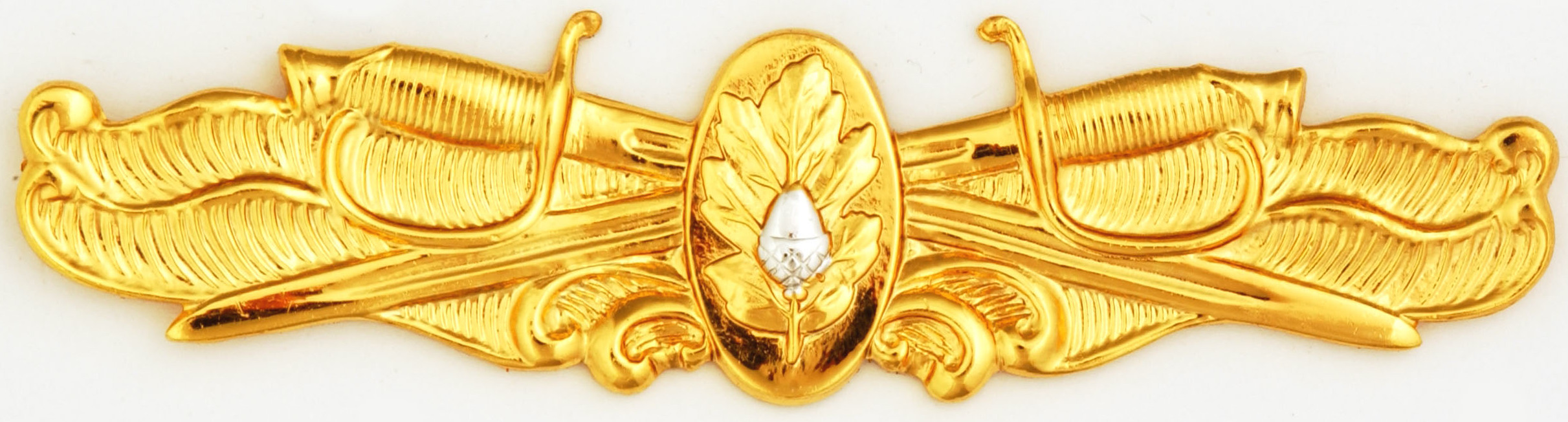
Surface Warfare Officer Insignia
Office of the Secretary of Defense Identification Badge

Navy Distinguished Service Medal
Legion of Merit (with one bronze award star)
Defense Meritorious Service Medal (with one bronze Oak leaf cluster)
Meritorious Service Medal (with two bronze award stars)
Navy and Marine Corps Commendation Medal
Joint Service Achievement Medal
Navy and Marine Corps Achievement Medal
Navy Meritorious Unit Commendation
Global War on Terrorism Service Medal
Battle Efficiency Ribbon (1st award)
National Defense Service Medal (with bronze service star)
Armed Forces Expeditionary Medal
Armed Forces Service Medal
Navy and Marine Corps Sea Service Deployment Ribbon
Navy and Marine Corps Overseas Service Ribbon
Coast Guard Special Operations Service Ribbon
Navy Expert Pistol Shot Medal

== See also ==
- Medical Corps (United States Navy)

Military offices
Preceded by Donald Arthur	Surgeon General of the United States Navy; 2007–2011	Succeeded by Matthew L. Nathan
