= Admiral Cowan =

Admiral Cowan may refer to

- Michael L. Cowan (born 1944), U.S. Navy admiral and Surgeon General of the United States Navy
- Walter Cowan, Admiral Sir Walter Henry Cowan, 1st Baronet
  - EML Admiral Cowan (M313), an Estonian minehunter named after him
