= Harold M. Koenig =

United States Navy vice admiral

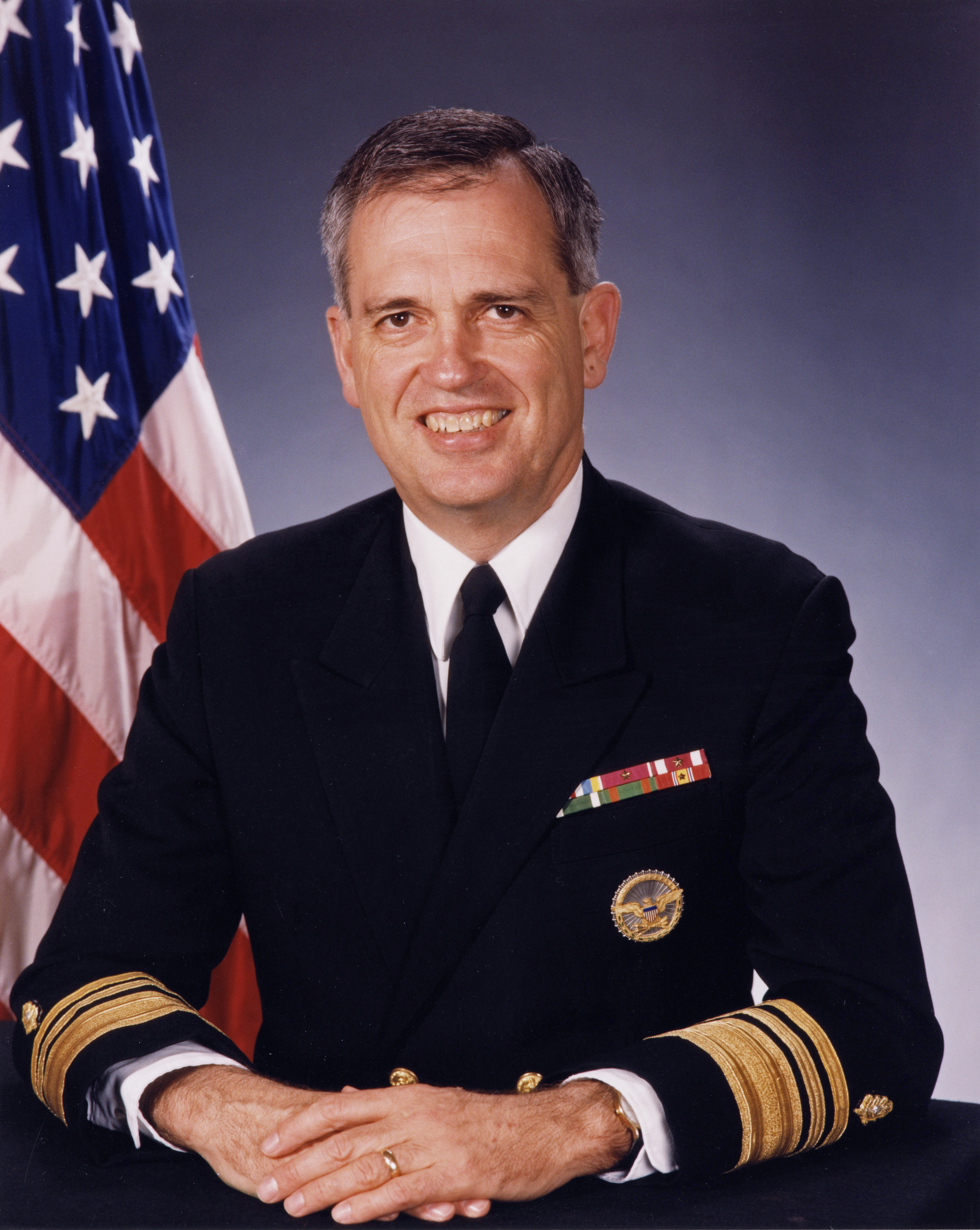
- Born: February 28, 1940 (age 86); Salinas, California, U.S.
- Military career
- Allegiance: United States
- Branch: United States Navy
- Service years: 1958–1998
- Rank: Vice admiral
- Commands: Surgeon General of the United States Navy

Harold Martin Koenig (born February 28, 1940) was a vice admiral in the United States Navy. He was Surgeon General of the United States Navy from 1995 to 1998.

== Biography ==
Harold M. Koenig was born in Salinas, California in 1940, the son of teachers in the local schools. He graduated high school in 1958, receiving an appointment to the U.S. Naval Academy. He was dismissed from the Academy after one year due to a progressive hearing loss, with a 4-F draft rating. This meant he was unfit for military service and was not subject to the draft. He transferred to Brigham Young University, graduating in 1962 with a degree in chemistry.

He received his Medical Degree from Baylor University College of Medicine in 1966 and was certified in general pediatrics and pediatric hematology-oncology.

By 1964, physicians and medical students were increasingly needed in Vietnam. He joined the Navy's Senior Medical Student program, where his 4-F rating was changed to 1-Y and he became eligible for the draft. Concurrently, he was commissioned as an Ensign on active duty. Upon graduation from medical school in 1966, he began a long career as a Navy Medical officer.

Koenig has served as a general medical officer, residency training program director, department chairman, and director of medical services. In June 1984, he became executive officer of Naval Hospital Portsmouth, Virginia. From July 1985 through June 1987, he was commanding officer, Naval Hospital, San Diego, California. He assumed command of Naval Health Sciences Education and Training Command, Bethesda, MD in July 1987. His staff tours included positions as Director, Health Care Operations in the Office of the Chief of Naval Operations, and Deputy Assistant Secretary of Defense (Health Affairs) for Health Services Operations.

Koenig served as Deputy Surgeon General of the Navy from 1994 to June 1995. He became Surgeon General in 1995, and retired in 1998 with the rank of Vice Admiral. His personal awards include the Defense Superior Service Medal, Legion of Merit with Gold Star, Meritorious Service Medal with Gold Star, Navy Commendation Medal, and the Navy Achievement Medal.
