= Richard A. Nelson =

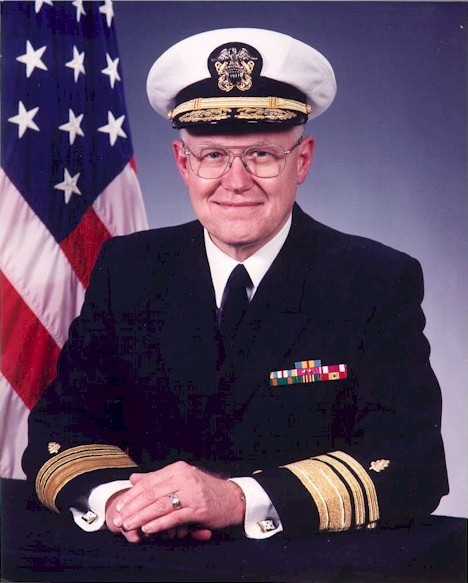
- Born: April 4, 1941 (age 85) near Perkins, Oklahoma, U.S.
- Military career
- Allegiance: United States
- Branch: United States Navy
- Service years: 1967–2001
- Rank: Vice admiral
- Commands: Surgeon General of the United States Navy

Richard A. Nelson (born April 4, 1941) is a former vice admiral in the United States Navy. He was Surgeon General of the United States Navy from 1998 to 2001.

Nelson entered the Navy in 1967 and spent a short time at Naval Hospital, Corpus Christi, Texas, then served as senior medical officer at the Naval Ammunition Depot, McAlester, Oklahoma. He also served as a medical officer at Naval Hospital, Bremerton, Washington, and Head of the Occupational Medicine Branch, Bureau of Medicine and Surgery in Washington, DC. After an assignment with the Navy Environmental Health Center in Cincinnati, Ohio, he returned to Bremerton as the Director of Occupational and Environmental Health Services and Fleet Liaison Team coordinator for the Naval Regional Medical Center.

His other assignments include commanding officer of the Navy Environmental Health Center in Norfolk; Director, Occupational Health and Preventive Medicine Division, and the Deputy Commander for Fleet Readiness and Support at the Naval Medical Command in Washington, DC; and Director of the Health Care Review Division for the Naval Inspector General in Washington, DC. From 1989-1991 he served as Commanding Officer, Naval Hospital, Bremerton. In 1991 he returned to Norfolk where he had three concurrent assignments as Fleet Surgeon, U.S. Atlantic Fleet; Command Surgeon, U.S. Atlantic Command, and Medical Advisor, Supreme Allied Command Atlantic. While assigned as Commander, Naval Medical Center, San Diego, California from 1993–98, Nelson also was the Lead Agent of TRICARE Region Nine.
