= Donald L. Custis =

American surgeon general (1917–2021)

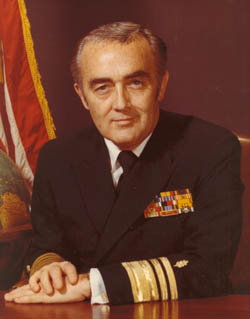
- Born: Donald Lauren Custis; July 23, 1917; Goshen, Indiana, U.S.
- Died: March 18, 2021 (aged 103); Savannah, Georgia, U.S.
- Military career
- Allegiance: United States of America
- Branch: United States Navy
- Service years: 1944–1946, 1956–1976
- Rank: Vice Admiral
- Commands: Surgeon General of the United States Navy
- Conflicts: World War II; Vietnam War
- Awards: Distinguished Service Medal; Legion of Merit
- Other work: Chief Medical Director, Veterans Administration

Donald Lauren Custis (July 23, 1917 – March 18, 2021) was an American vice admiral in the United States Navy who served as Surgeon General of the United States Navy from 1973 to 1976. He later served as chief medical director for the Veterans Administration from 1980 to 1984.

== Biography ==
Custis was born in Goshen, Indiana, on July 23, 1917, the son of Lauren A. and Margaret (Shannon) Custis. He attended Wabash College, Crawfordsville, Indiana, from which he received the degree of Bachelor of Arts in 1939. He was commissioned ensign in the U. S. Naval Reserve on December 10, 1939, and while on inactive duty completed his medical training at Northwestern University, Evanston, Illinois, from which he received the degree of Doctor of Medicine in 1942. A commissioned lieutenant (junior grade) in the Medical Corps of the U. S. Naval Reserve on May 20, 1943, he advanced to lieutenant, to date from August 1, 1946, and on April 27, 1951, resigned his reserve commission. On October 8, 1956, he accepted an appointment as commander in the Medical Corps of the regular U. S. Navy and was later promoted to captain, to date from February 1, 1961. His selection for the rank of rear admiral was approved by the president on May 10, 1972.

After receiving his commission in 1943, in an inactive capacity, he served his internship at the Presbyterian Hospital, Chicago, Illinois. Ordered into active naval service in 1944, he was assigned to the Naval Hospital, San Leandro, California, during October 1944, and the next month reported for instruction at the Small Craft Training Center, San Pedro, California. In February 1945 he joined the USS Clinton (APA-144) to serve as junior medical officer and medical officer until April 1946. Ordered to the Separation Center, Great Lakes, Illinois, he remained there until released from active duty on August 1, 1946.

Following his release from active duty, he served a residency in surgery at the Mason Clinic Seattle, Washington, and was subsequently engaged in private practice (surgery) in Seattle. Returning to active naval service on October 8, 1956, he was assigned to the Naval Hospital, Portsmouth, Virginia, and in July 1958 reported as chief of surgical service at the Naval Hospital, Guantanamo Bay, Cuba. He remained there until July 1960, after which he served as assistant chief of surgical service at the Naval Hospital, Great Lakes, Illinois. In March 1963 he became chief of surgical service at the Naval Hospital, Beaufort, South Carolina, and in July 1965 transferred, in a similar capacity, to the Naval Hospital, Philadelphia, Pennsylvania. He became executive officer of the latter in September 1967.

In May 1969, he reported as senior medical officer at Naval Support Activity, Danang, Republic of Vietnam. “For exceptionally meritorious conduct… while serving with friendly foreign forces engaged in armed conflict against the Viet Cong and North Vietnamese Communist aggressors in the Republic of Vietnam from May 1969 to May 1970...” he was awarded the Legion of Merit with Combat “‘V”. On July 17, 1970, he assumed command of the Naval Hospital, National Naval Medical Center, Bethesda, Maryland and was assigned additional duty as deputy commanding officer of the Naval Medical Center. In May 1972 he was selected for promotion to the rank of rear admiral, Medical Corps, United States Navy.

In January 1973, Custis was appointed by the president to serve a four-year term as the 26th Surgeon General of the Navy and chief, Bureau of Medicine and Surgery. He assumed the duties of that office on February 1, 1973, by and with the advice and consent of the United States Senate, and was promoted to the rank of vice admiral. Custis served as surgeon general until August 1, 1976.

In addition to the Legion of Merit with Combat “V”, Custis has the Distinguished Service Medal, the Combat Action Ribbon, the China Service Medal, the American Campaign Medal, the Asiatic-Pacific Campaign Medal, the World War II Victory Medal, the Navy Occupation Service Medal (Asia Clasp), the National Defense Service Medal with bronze star and the Vietnam Service Medal with bronze star. He was awarded the Armed Forces Honor Medal First Class by the Republic of Vietnam and also has the Republic of Vietnam Campaign Medal. He was a diplomate of the American Board of General Surgery and a member of Phi Beta Kappa and the American College of surgeons. During 1955 and 1956, he was a member of the American Medical Association's Council on Medical Education.

After retirement from the Navy, Custis joined the Veterans Administration (VA) as assistant chief medical director for academic affairs. He was subsequently appointed chief medical director for the VA by President Jimmy Carter, serving from 1980 to 1984. Custis then went to work for the Paralyzed Veterans of America as their medical director.

Custis died in Savannah, Georgia, in March 2021 at the age of 103. He was interred beside his wife Phyllis Hodson Custis (April 20, 1916 – December 2, 2005) at Arlington National Cemetery on July 6, 2021.
