= James A. Zimble =

U.S. Navy Medical Corps physician (1933–2011)

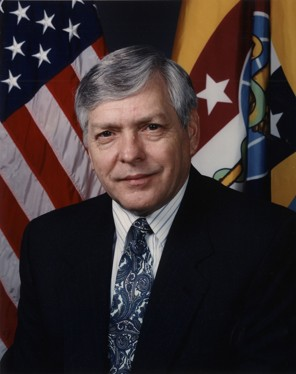
- Born: October 12, 1933; Philadelphia, Pennsylvania, U.S.
- Died: December 14, 2011 (aged 78); New London, Connecticut
- Education: Franklin & Marshall College (BS); University of Pennsylvania (MD)
- Scientific career
- Fields: physician

James Allen Zimble (October 12, 1933 – December 14, 2011) was a commissioned officer in the Medical Corps of the United States Navy. His Navy career spanned 35 years of service, beginning in 1956 at the rank of ensign and ending in 1991 at the rank of vice admiral. He served as the 30th Surgeon General of the United States Navy from 1987 to 1991. After retiring from the Navy in 1991, Zimble was appointed President of the Uniformed Services University of the Health Sciences in Bethesda, Maryland. He remained in that position until 2004.

== Early life ==
Zimble, an only child, was born on 12 October 1933 in Philadelphia. Shortly after his birth, the family moved to Little Rock, Arkansas, where they lived until 1946. His parents, both hearing impaired, were employed as teachers of deaf children. In 1946, the Zimble family relocated back to Philadelphia.

== Education and training ==
Zimble enrolled in Franklin & Marshall College in Lancaster, Pennsylvania, in 1951, from where he earned a Bachelor of Science degree in 1955 and was a member of the Pi Lambda Phi fraternity. Later that year, he matriculated in the University of Pennsylvania School of Medicine. The following year, he accepted a commission in the United States Navy Reserve at the rank of ensign. Zimble received his Doctor of Medicine degree in 1959. He completed his internship at the U.S. Naval Hospital at St. Albans, New York, from 1959 to 1960, then trained in undersea medicine at the Naval School, Diving and Salvage (NSDS, often referred to as the U.S. Navy Deep Sea Diving School) and also at the U.S. Navy Nuclear Power School until 1961. Zimble returned to St. Albans in 1963 for residency training in obstetrics and gynecology.

== Career ==
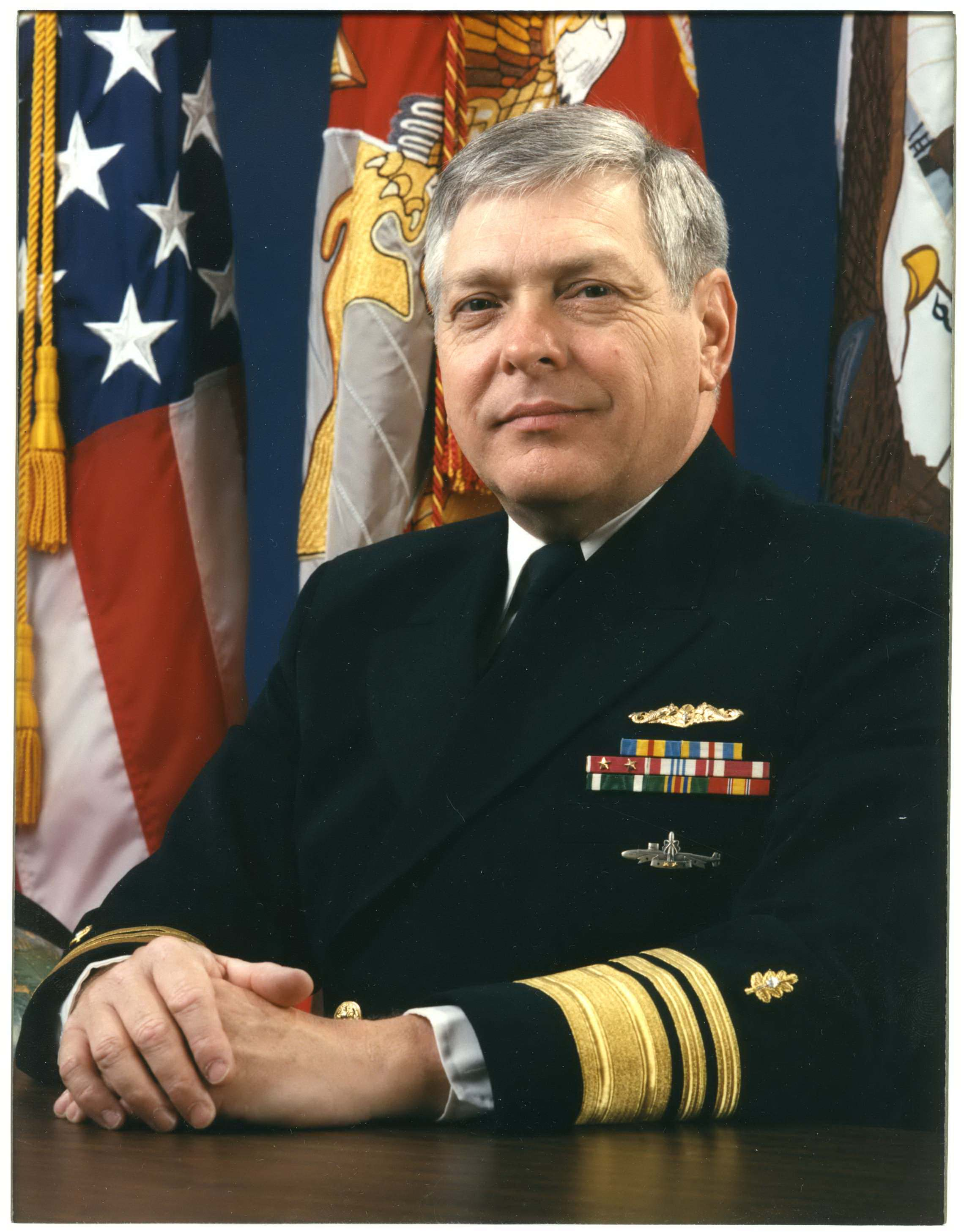
Vice Admiral Zimble as Surgeon General of the United States Navy.

Serving as the submarine medical officer for the commissioning crew of the USS John Marshall (SSBN-611) from 1961 to 1963, he received the Submarine Medical insignia.

After completing his residency in 1966, he was assigned to the obstetrics and gynecology department at the U.S. Naval Hospital at the Marine Corps Base Camp Pendleton in California; he remained there until 1970.

On 1 August 1970, while on his way to report for his next assignment (at the U.S. Naval Hospital at the Philadelphia Naval Shipyard), Zimble was involved in a motor vehicle accident which resulted in his being hospitalized for a year and a half. During this time, he began to redirect his efforts towards a career in executive medicine. In late 1971, he finally reported to the U.S. Naval Hospital in Philadelphia, where he remained on the medical staff until the following year. From 1972 to 1976, Zimble was Chief of OB/GYN and Director of Clinical Services at the U.S. Naval Hospital at the Naval Air Station Lemoore in Lemoore, California. From 1976 to 1978, he was assigned as Director of Clinical Services at the Naval Regional Medical Center at the Naval Station Long Beach in Long Beach, California. From 1978 to 1981, he was Commanding Officer of the Naval Regional Medical Center in Orlando, Florida.

In 1981, Zimble was promoted to flag rank and was assigned as Medical Officer of the Marine Corps. He held that office, stationed at Headquarters Marine Corps, until 1983. Later that year, RADM Zimble was promoted to Fleet Surgeon for the Commander in Chief, U.S. Atlantic Fleet (CINCLANTFLT) and Medical Advisor to the Supreme Allied Commander Atlantic (SACLANT). In that post, he was responsible for the health of United States Navy and United States Marine Corps personnel and contingency and wartime planning of medical support to operational forces.

In 1986, RADM Zimble was again promoted, this time as the Deputy Assistant Secretary of Defense for Strategic Planning and Medical Program Management (subsequently redesignated as the Force Health Protection & Readiness (FHP&R)) in the Office of the Assistant Secretary of Defense for Health Affairs. In this role, Zimble was the executive secretary of the Defense Department's Advisory Committee on graduate medical education. He was responsible for the oversight of the development of an integrated global plan for military medicine and the implementation of the Military Health Services System Sizing model.

In 1987, Zimble was promoted to vice admiral (VADM) and held the office of Surgeon General of the United States Navy. As Navy Surgeon General, Zimble was the principal medical advisor to the United States Department of the Navy. He was responsible for developing and establishing overall naval health care policies and priorities, contingency and wartime planning, and program development in support of more than 2.8 million United States Navy and Marine Corps active duty and retired beneficiaries and their families. During this period, Zimble also presided over the disestablishment of the Naval Medical Command and the re-establishment of the Navy Bureau of Medicine and Surgery (BUMED). He also oversaw the deployment of the Navy's two hospital ships (USNS Mercy and USNS Comfort), the fleet hospitals, and Medical Department personnel for Operations Desert Shield and Desert Storm.

Upon his retirement from the Navy in 1991, VADM Zimble was replaced as Surgeon General of the United States Navy by VADM Donald F. Hagen.

Later that year, Zimble was appointed by Dick Cheney, the United States Secretary of Defense, as President of the Uniformed Services University of the Health Sciences (USUHS) in Bethesda, Maryland. As President of USUHS, Zimble established the USUHS Graduate School of Nursing in 1993. Since that time, the USUHS GSN has grown from its charter class of two students in one advanced practice nursing discipline in 1993 to more than 530 graduates in five program areas. Zimble also established the National Capital Area Medical Simulation Center, which has since become a world class model for medical simulation education. Zimble remained President of USUHS until 2004.

== Personal life ==
James A. Zimble married the former Mona C. Melton. He had three children and five step-children.

== Death ==
Zimble died on December 14, 2011, of coronary artery disease at Lawrence and Memorial Hospital in New London, Connecticut.

== Honors and awards ==
Honors and awards that Zimble has received include:

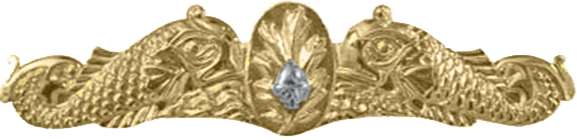
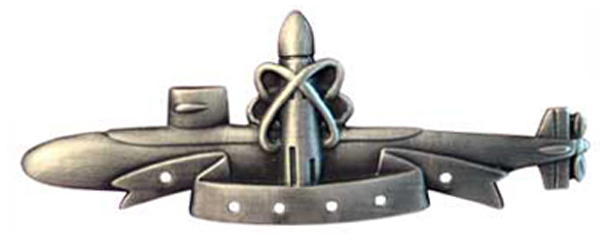
Submarine Medical Badge
Silver SSBN Deterrent Patrol insignia with two gold stars
Office of the Secretary of Defense Identification Badge

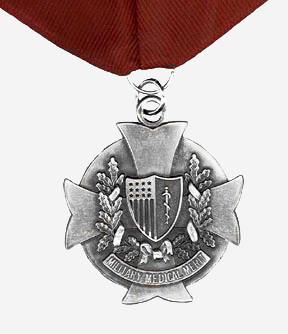
Defense Distinguished Service Medal
Navy Distinguished Service Medal
Defense Superior Service Medal
Legion of Merit with two gold award stars
Defense Meritorious Service Medal
Meritorious Service Medal
Navy Commendation Medal
Navy Meritorious Unit Commendation
Surgeon General's Medallion (USPHSCC)
National Defense Service Medal with one bronze service star
Order of Military Medical Merit

Honorary Doctor of Science degree from the State University of New York at Syracuse
Frank Brown Berry Prize in Federal Health Care
Founder's Medal (Association of Military Surgeons of the United States)
Distinguished Service Award (Naval Reserve Association)
