= Donald F. Hagen =

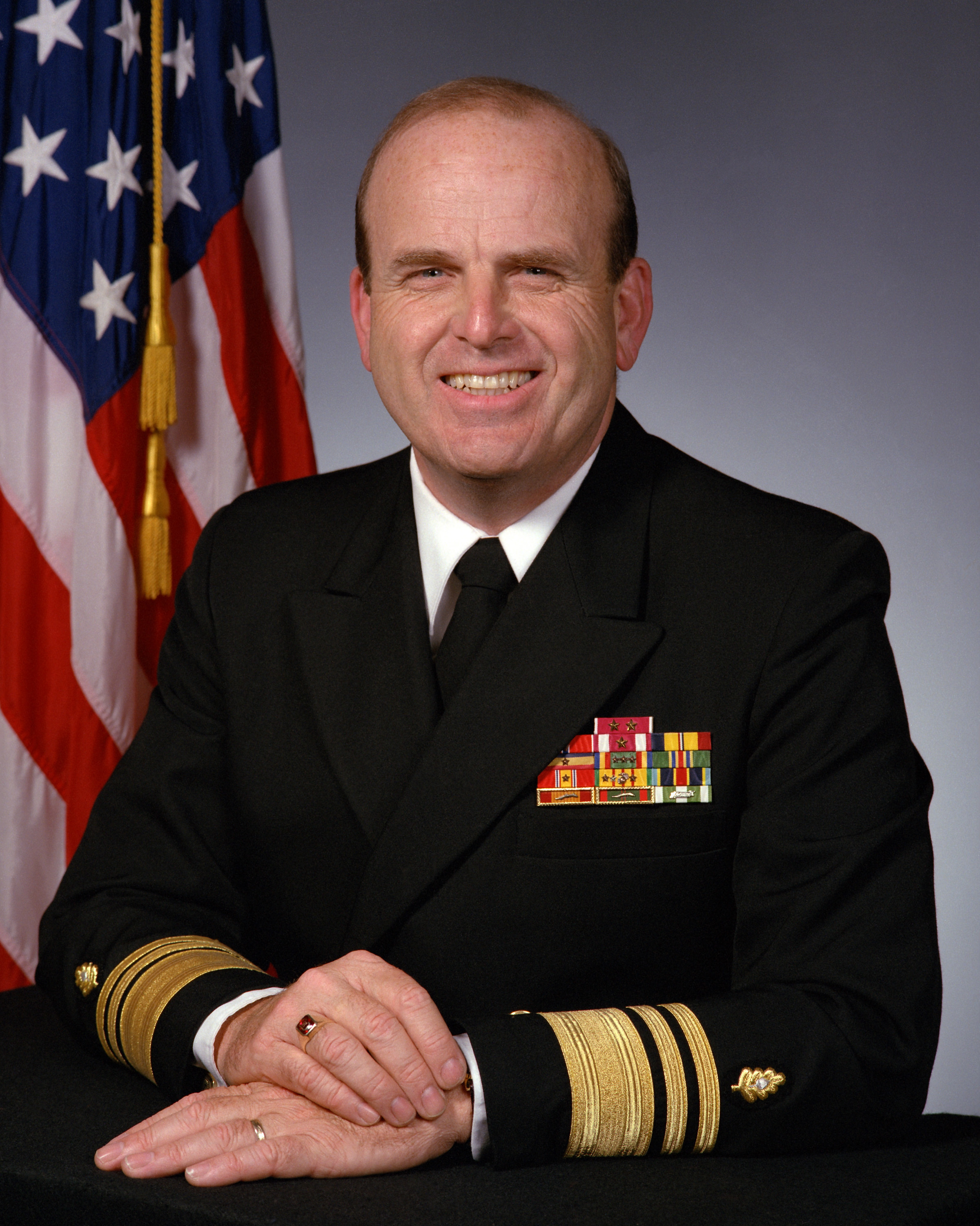
- Born: January 2, 1938 (age 88); Ambrose, North Dakota, U.S.
- Military career
- Allegiance: United States of America
- Branch: United States Navy
- Service years: 1951–1995
- Rank: Vice Admiral
- Commands: Surgeon General of the United States Navy
- Awards: Legion of Merit; Bronze Star Medal

Donald Floyd Hagen (born January 2, 1938) was a vice admiral in the United States Navy. He was Surgeon General of the United States Navy from 1991 to 1995. Hagen was commissioned in 1951 as an ensign and retired on June 29, 1995 as a vice admiral.

Hagen studied at Concordia College and then received his medical degree from Northwestern University.

Hagen joined the Navy in 1964. He then served in Vietnam as a battalion surgeon with the Marines, aboard the hospital ship USS Repose, and as a surgeon in the Mekong Delta. Hagen was awarded the Bronze Star for his service as a combat surgeon. Following a series of shore assignments at naval hospitals, he became Commander of the National Naval Medical Center.

After his retirement from active service, Hagen served as executive vice chancellor and chief administrative officer of the University of Kansas Medical Center from September 1, 1995 to December 31, 2004. He is a Fellow of the American College of Surgeons.
