= Bartholomew W. Hogan =

United States Navy officer and psychiatrist

Bartholomew Hogan
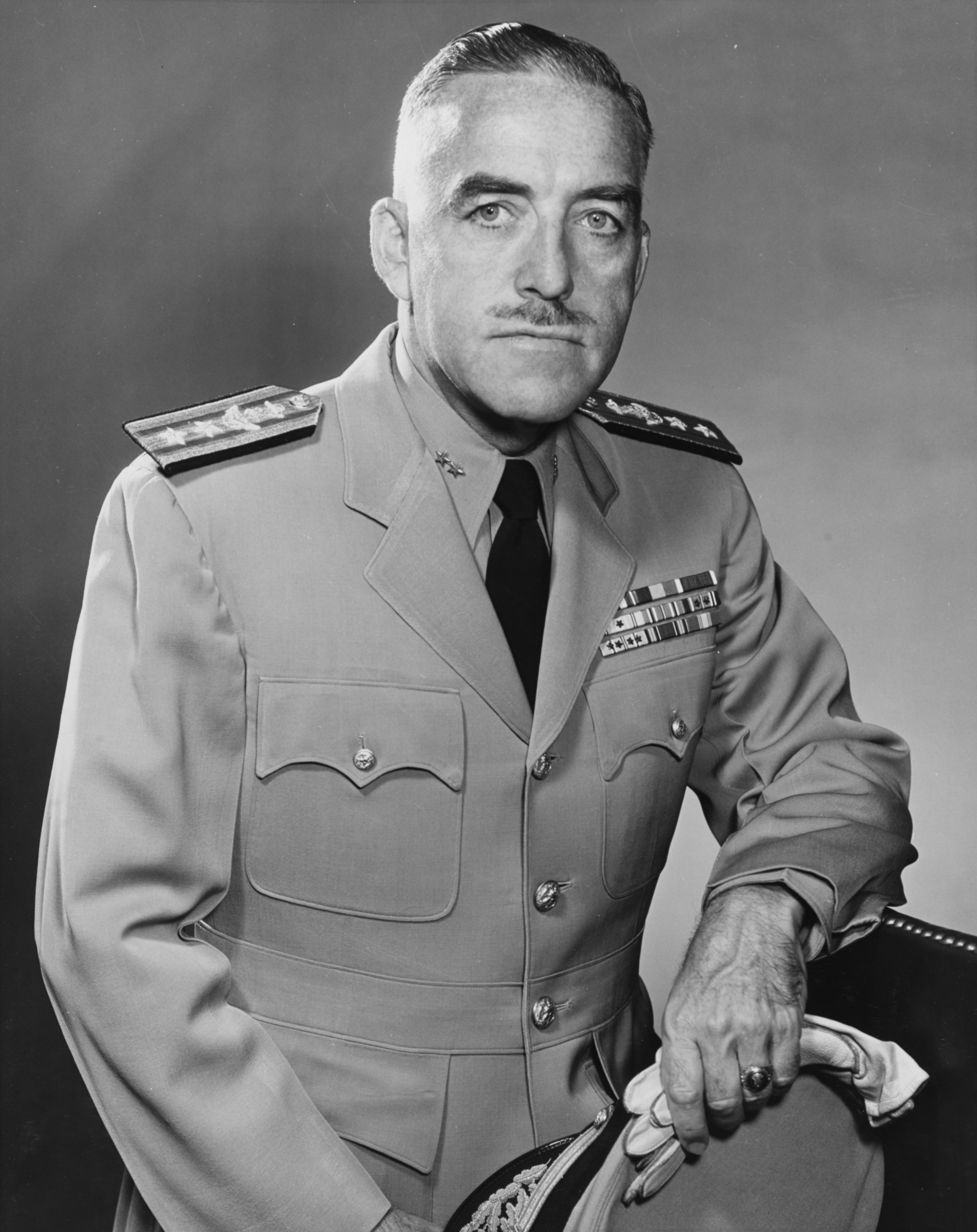
- Portrait photograph of Hogan
- Born: January 29, 1901; West Quincy, Massachusetts, U.S.
- Died: March 17, 1983 (aged 82); Lake Wales, Florida, U.S.
- Burial place: Arlington National Cemetery
- Education: Boston College; Tufts University (MD)
- Spouse: Grace Gloninger (died 1972)
- Military career
- Allegiance: United States
- Branch: United States Navy
- Service years: 1925–1961
- Rank: Rear Admiral
- Nickname: "Bart"
- Commands: Surgeon General of the United States Navy
- Conflicts: World War II: Pacific War
- Awards: Navy Distinguished Service Medal; Navy and Marine Corps Medal; Purple Heart
- Other work: Deputy medical director of the American Psychiatric Association

Bartholomew William Hogan (January 29, 1901 – March 17, 1983) was a psychiatrist, professor and United States Navy officer. Hogan graduated from Boston College in 1923 and received an M.D. from Tufts University in 1925. In the 1930s, he taught at Georgetown University School of Medicine and the U.S. Naval Hospital in Annapolis, Maryland. During World War II, he served as a senior medical officer on several ships. He was appointed to the rank of rear admiral in 1952 and became Surgeon General of the United States Navy in 1955. After he retired from the U.S. Navy in 1961, he served as deputy medical director of the American Psychiatric Association until 1971. Rear Admiral Hogan died on March 17, 1983. Hogan is buried in Arlington National Cemetery.

== Awards and honors ==
During World War II, Hogan was serving as senior medical officer aboard the carrier USS Wasp when it was sunk by Japanese torpedoes in September 1942. Rescued from the water by an American destroyer, he continued to aid casualties despite his own burns and other injuries and was subsequently awarded the Navy and Marine Corps Medal and Purple Heart. After serving as surgeon general from February 1955 to February 1961, Hogan was awarded the Navy Distinguished Service Medal.

Hogan received multiple honorary degrees. He received an honorary Doctor of Science from Boston College in 1955, as well as an honorary degree from Tufts University.

The Bartholomew Hogan Award for Outstanding Research Paper Among Navy Psychiatry Residents is awarded annually at the Braceland Seminar, a yearly academic conference held before the American Psychiatric Association annual meeting.

Military offices
Preceded by H. Lamont Pugh	Surgeon General of the United States Navy; 1955–1961	Succeeded by Edward C. Kenney
