= Presley Marion Rixey =

United States admiral and physician

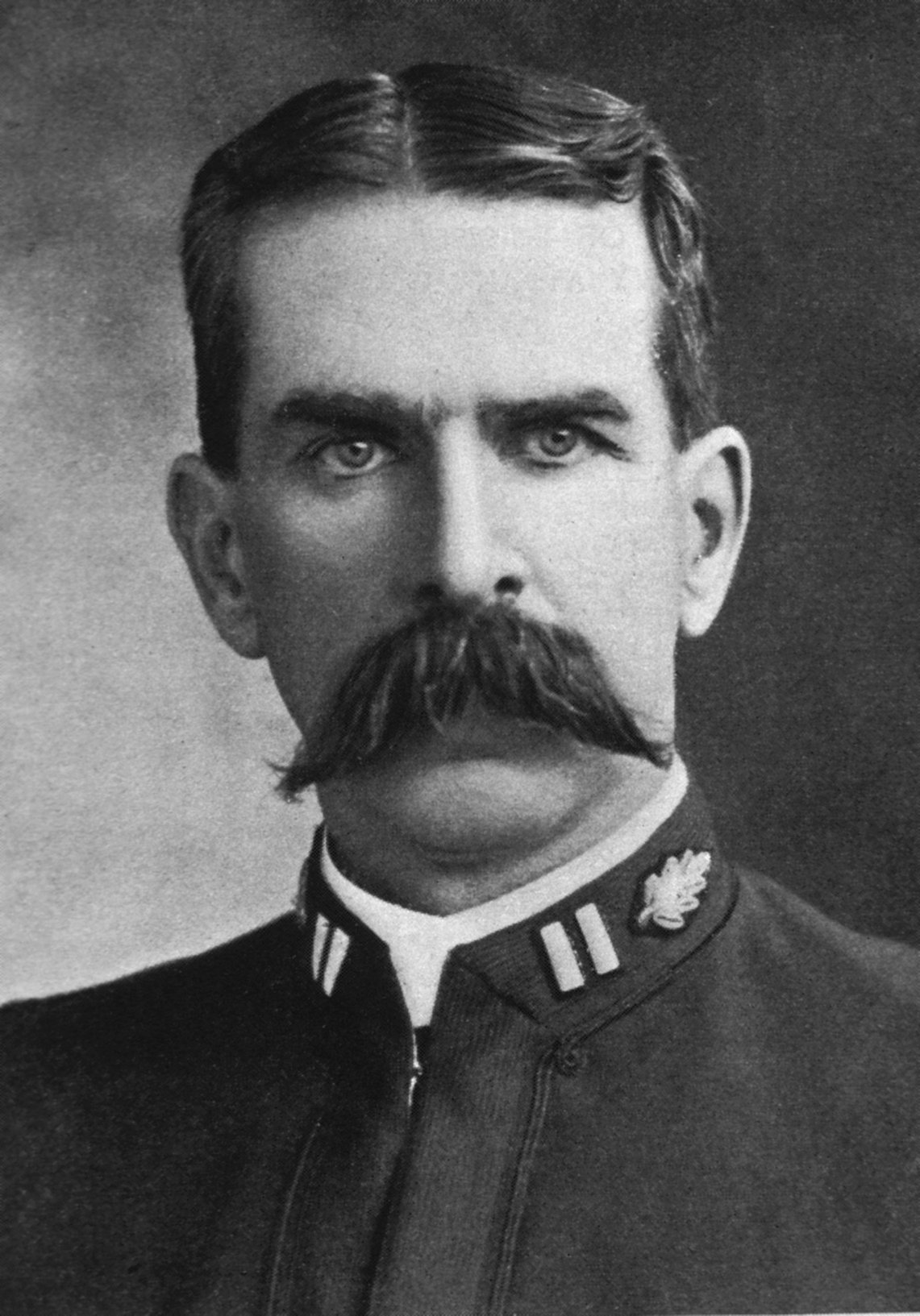
- Born: July 14, 1852; Culpeper, Virginia
- Died: June 17, 1928 (aged 75); Rosslyn, Virginia
- Burial place: Arlington National Cemetery
- Military career
- Allegiance: United States
- Branch: United States Navy
- Service years: 1874–1910
- Rank: Rear Admiral

Rear Admiral Presley Marion Rixey (14 July 1852, Culpeper, Virginia – 17 June 1928) was a Surgeon General of the United States Navy (1902–10) and personal physician to Presidents William McKinley and Theodore Roosevelt.

== Biography ==
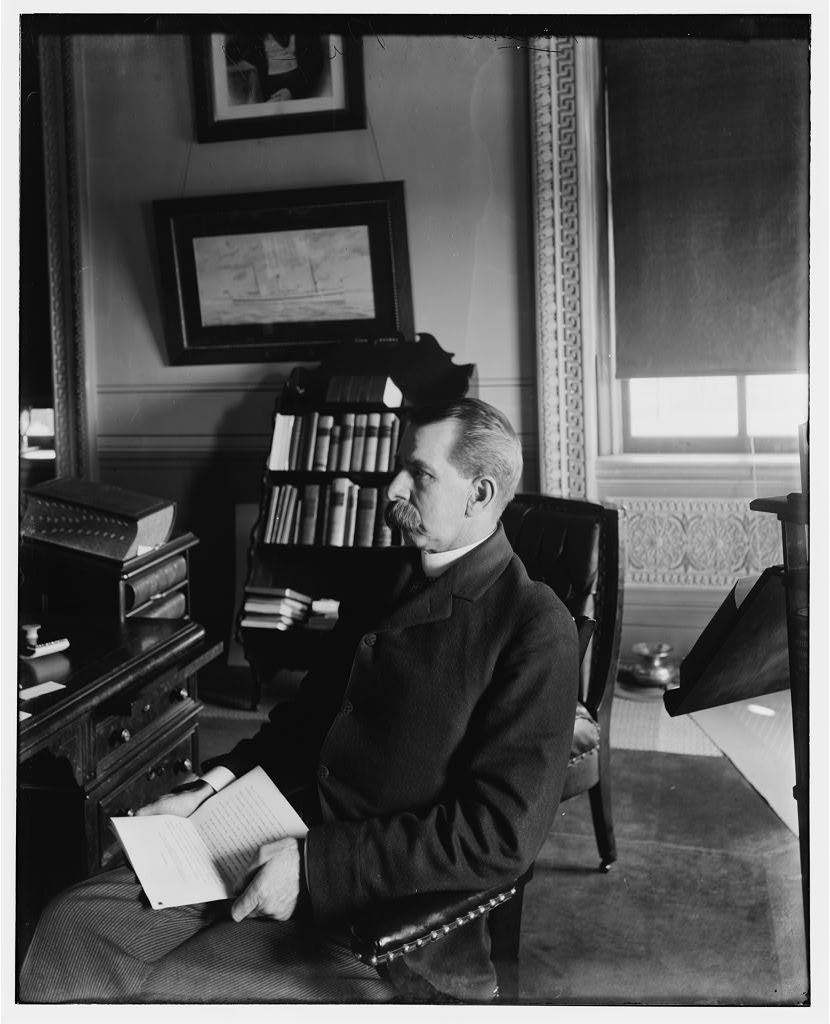
Presley Marion Rixey

The older brother of John Franklin Rixey, Rixey earned his medical degree at the University of Virginia in 1873. On 25 April 1877, he married Earlena J. English, daughter of Rear Admiral Earl English, United States Navy.

He was commissioned Assistant Surgeon in the Navy on 28 January 1874. He served on the Sabine, Congress, Tallapoosa (1879–82), Lancaster (1884–87), Dolphin (1893–96), and Solace, receiving promotion to Passed Assistant Surgeon on 18 April 1877, to Surgeon on 27 November 1888, and was commissioned as a Medical Inspector on 24 August 1900. He was assigned as the personal physician to First Lady Ida McKinley in 1899 and spearheaded her improved health during the following few years. As he traveled with the McKinleys during this time providing personal care of Mrs. McKinley, he was present when President McKinley was shot in Buffalo. He attended President McKinley after he was shot in Buffalo, New York, in 1901.

Rixey was appointed Surgeon General of the United States Navy on 15 February 1902 and served as Chief of the Bureau of Medicine and Surgery, with the rank of rear admiral, until his retirement on 4 February 1910.

During his tenure as Surgeon General, Rixey strongly supported the foundation of a women's nursing corps for the Navy. In his 1902 annual report, he stated that, "There has been a growing conviction in the minds of many of the most experienced medical officers of the service, especially since the war with Spain, that the employment of women for the nursing of the sick in our large hospitals would result in greater efficiency than has been obtained heretofore by the use of male nurses alone, and that such employment would not conflict with the conditions arising from the military character of the institution." With his help, the Navy Nurse Corps was finally established in 1908.

He accompanied President Theodore Roosevelt during his November 1906 visit to the Panama Canal Zone, and reviewed health and sanitation procedures there.

From 16 January 1913 to 16 April 1917, Rixey served as a member of the Naval Examining Board, presiding over it during the last four months of that period. He died at his home in Rosslyn, Virginia., on 17 June 1928. He is interred in Arlington National Cemetery.

== Awards ==
Rixey received the Spanish Order of Naval Merit from King Alfonso XIII of Spain for assistance he gave to the crew of the replica of the Santa Maria after that vessel suffered an explosion in New York Harbor on May 26, 1893, on its way to the World's Columbian Exposition.
