= Phineas Jonathan Horwitz =

American surgeon

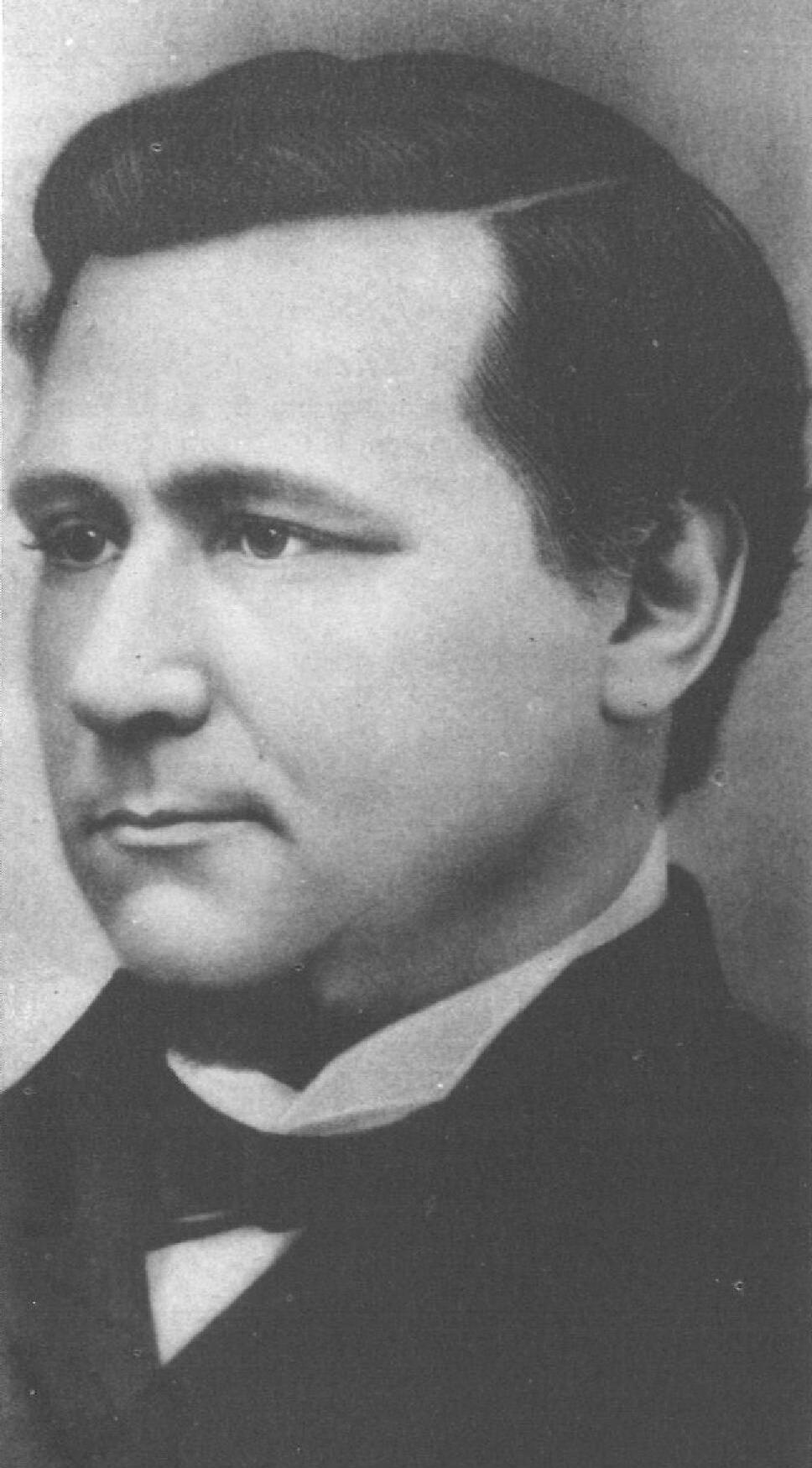
- Born: March 3, 1822; Baltimore, Maryland
- Died: September 18, 1904 (aged 82); Bar Harbor, Maine
- Education: University of Maryland, Jefferson Medical College
- Occupation: Surgeon
- Known for: Chief of the Bureau of Medicine and Surgery, U.S. Navy
- Spouse: Carolyn Norris (1828–1877)
- Children: Theodore (1856–1877); Joseph Parker (1858–1860); Orville (1860–1912); Caroline Norris (1861–1862); Thomas Lloyd Norris (1863–1900); John Meredith Reed (1865–1865); Amelia Reed (1866–); George Quintard (1868–1916)
- Parent(s): Jonathan (Jonas) Horwitz; Deborah Andrews

Phineas Jonathan Horwitz (March 3, 1822 – September 18, 1904) was an American surgeon.

== Biography ==
Born to a Jewish family in Baltimore, Phineas was the son of immigrant Dr. Jonathan (Jonas) Horwitz and his wife, Deborah Andrews, the granddaughter of the Revolutionary War financier Haym Salomon. Phineas was educated at private schools in Baltimore then studied medicine at the University of Maryland. Following his graduation in 1845, he continued his medical studies at the Jefferson Medical College in Philadelphia.

== Career ==
After passing the exams of the U.S. Navy's Medical Department, he was appointed Assistant Surgeon on November 18, 1847. His first posting was to the Gulf Squadron, which was engaged against Mexico during the Mexican–American War. He was soon placed in charge of the Naval Hospital in Frontera de Tabasco, where he would remain until the end of the war. His work at the hospital earned him a commendation from the squadron commander, Commodore Matthew C. Perry.

Following the end of the conflict, Dr. Horwitz was posted to the USS Constitution, which was joining the Mediterranean Squadron following its refitting in 1847. He then joined the supply ship USS Relief, bound for Brazil. Following an examination, he was promoted in 1853 and assigned to the steamer USS Princeton, where he would serve for two years.

While the Princeton stationed in Philadelphia, Dr. Horwitz met his wife, Caroline Norris, whom he married in 1854; the couple would have seven sons and two daughters. Their son Orville, born in 1860, would go on to become professor of genito-urinary surgery in Jefferson Medical College. George Quintard, born in 1868, would become a lawyer in Philadelphia. Caroline herself was a published author, including Swanhilde, Fairy Lure, and Twentieth Century Chronology of the World.

Phineas joined the USS Supply in 1855, and the ship performed duty at stations near Africa and Brazil. In 1859 he returned to the United States to become an assistant at the U.S. Navy's Bureau of Medicine and Surgery. He served there throughout the American Civil War, receiving a promotion to the grade of Surgeon on April 19, 1861; a rank equivalent to lieutenant commander. Following the death of Surgeon William Whelan, he became Chief of the Bureau, July 1, 1865: equivalent in rank to commodore. While chief of the bureau, he was in charge of the construction of the naval hospitals at Philadelphia and Mare Island, California.

His term of service ended July 1, 1869, whereupon he left to take charge of the Naval Hospital in Philadelphia. There he would also serve as president of the examining board. On March 3, 1871, he was promoted to medical inspector, with a rank equivalent to commander, then to medical director on June 30, 1873, which is equivalent in rank to captain. He was assigned to the Naval Asylum in 1877, where he would remain until 1883.

On March 3, 1884, he retired after 38 years of active service.

== Death ==
Phineas died on September 18, 1904, after holding an officers rank for 58 years. He was cremated and his ashes buried in Philadelphia. His wife, Caroline, had died earlier on February 18, 1877. Dr. Horwitz was a member of the Military Order of the Loyal Legion of the United States, and at one point served as the Senior Vice-Commander of the state of Pennsylvania.

== See also ==
- Uriah P. Levy
