= William Knickerbocker Van Reypen =

Surgeon General of the U. S. Navy

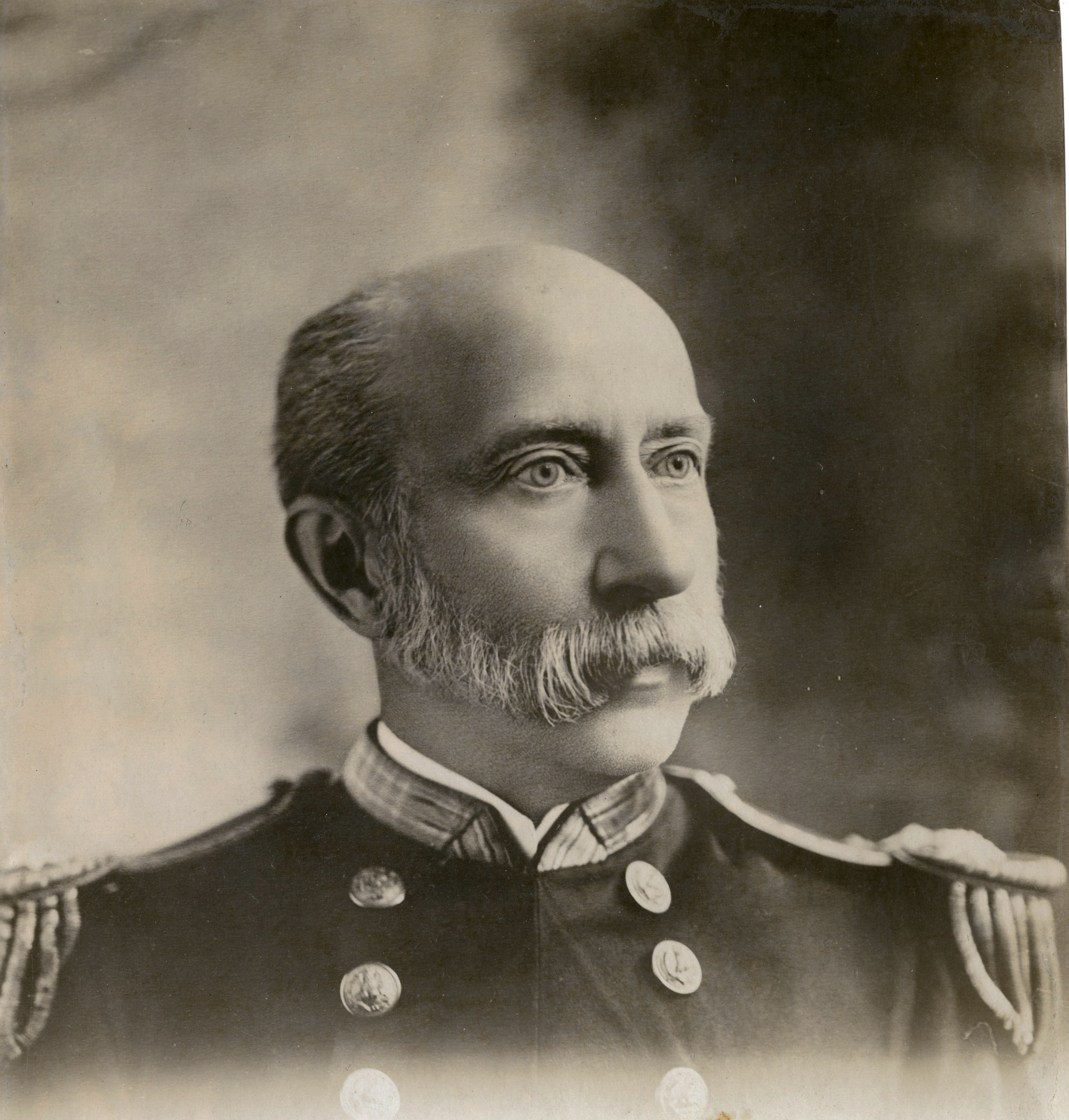
- Born: November 14, 1840; Bergen, New Jersey
- Died: December 22, 1924 (aged 84); Washington, D.C.
- Service / branch: United States Navy
- Years of service: 1861–1902
- Known for: U.S.S. Solace
- Battles / wars: American Civil War; Spanish–American War

RADM William Knickerbocker Van Reypen (November 14, 1840 – December 22, 1924) was the sixteenth Chief of the Bureau of Medicine and Surgery (BUMED) and the twelfth Surgeon General of the U. S. Navy, serving from 1897 to 1902.

== Early life and education ==
Van Reypen was born in Bergen City, New Jersey (which has since been annexed as part of Jersey City, New Jersey), the son of Cornelius C. and Christina C. (Van Alen) Van Reypen. He completed an A.B. degree at New York University in 1858. Van Reypen received his M.D. degree from the Medical College of New York University in 1862. He was also awarded an A.M. degree by New York University in 1863. On September 21, 1876, he was married to Constance Eleanor "Nellie" (Wells) Van Reypen. They had one son in 1883, also William Knickerbocker Van Reypen, who died by suicide in 1906. He served as the Vice President of the Holland Society of New York from 1891 to 1893.

== Career ==
Van Reypen served at the beginning of the Civil War as a Fife Major in the 2nd New Jersey Militia from May 1861 to July 1861. His first professional job was as Assistant Surgeon in New Jersey in 1861. He served in a variety of shore duty posts, being promoted to Medical Inspector in 1887 and medical director in 1893. President McKinley appointed him as Surgeon General on October 23, 1897, to succeed Newton Bates who died in office.

During the Spanish–American War he designed and equipped a hospital ship, the U.S.S. Solace, the first time one had been present in naval warfare and the first to fly the Red Cross flag. These ships were important because not only could they treat the sick and the wounded, they could also make the other ships more efficient by leaving them with only soldiers who could participate. The U.S.S. Solace was neutral under the terms of the 1864 Geneva Convention. He was the head of the Red Cross Society, directly succeeding Clara Barton, serving from 1904 to 1905. He helped set up the Red Cross's Duluth Chapter.

Van Reypen retired with the rank of Senior Rear Admiral after forty years of service in 1902. He lived in Washington, D.C. after retirement and died there in 1924. Van Reypen and his wife are interred at Arlington National Cemetery.
