= Matthew L. Nathan =

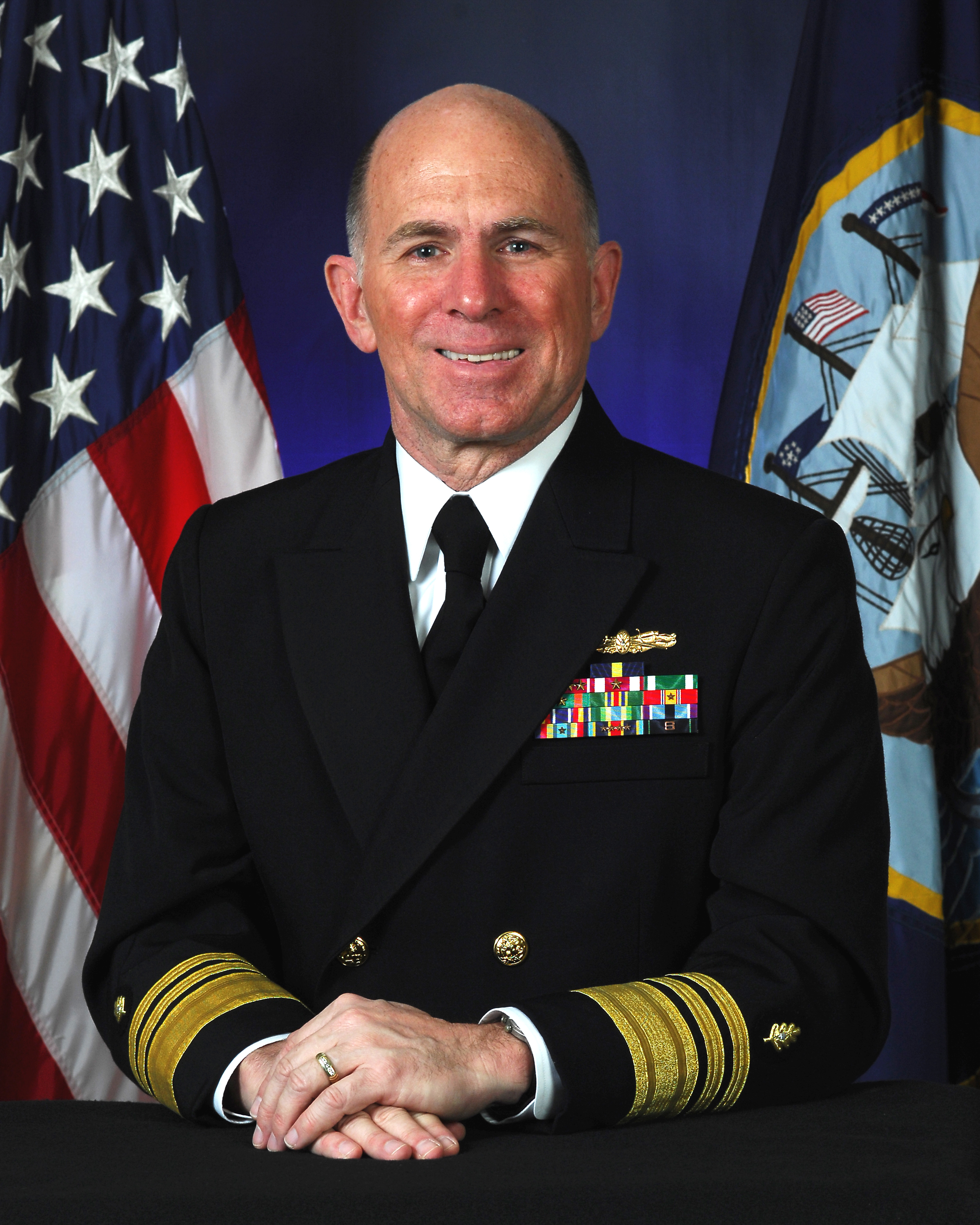
- Military career
- Allegiance: United States
- Branch: United States Navy
- Rank: Vice Admiral
- Unit: Medical Corps

Vice Admiral Matthew L. Nathan served as the 37th Surgeon General of the United States Navy.

== Education ==
Nathan received his Bachelor of Science from Georgia Tech and his M.D. from the Medical College of Georgia in 1981. He completed Internal Medicine specialty training in 1984 at the University of South Florida.

== Career ==
Nathan then served as the Internal Medicine Dept Head at Naval Hospital Guantanamo Bay, Cuba. In 1985 Nathan transferred to Naval Hospital, Groton, Connecticut as leader of the Medical Mobilization Amphibious Surgical Support Team. In 1987, Nathan transferred to Naval Medical Center San Diego as Head, Division of Internal Medicine with additional duty to the Marine Corps, 1st Marine Division.

In 1990 he served as a Department Head, Naval Hospital Beaufort, South Carolina before reporting to Naval Clinics Command, London, U.K. where he participated in military-to-military engagements with post-Soviet Eastern European countries. In 1995, he was assigned as specialist assignment officer at the Bureau of Naval Personnel, providing guidance to over 1,500 U.S. Navy Medical Corps officers. In 1998 he accepted a seat at the Joint Industrial College of the Armed Forces located in Washington, D.C., graduating in 1999 with a Masters in “Resourcing the National Strategy.” Nathan went on to serve as the Fleet Surgeon, Forward Deployed Naval Forces, Commander, U.S. 7th Fleet, aboard the flagship USS Blue Ridge (LCC 19), out of Yokosuka, Japan. In 2001, he transferred as Deputy Commander, Navy Medical Center Portsmouth, Va.

In 2004 Nathan assumed command of Naval Hospital Pensacola with additional oversight of 12 clinics in 4 states where he oversaw Navy medical relief efforts following hurricanes Ivan, Dennis, and Katrina. Despite all facilities receiving crippling blows; his command still garnered the TRICARE/DOD award for "highest patient satisfaction in a medium sized facility". In June 2006, he transferred as the Fleet Surgeon to the commander, U.S. Fleet Forces Command, instrumental in organizing the Fleet Health Domain integration with the Fleet Readiness Enterprise while providing medical global force management. In 2007, Nathan was assigned as Commander, Naval Medical Center Portsmouth and Navy Medicine Region East with command of over 18,000 personnel and an operating budget exceeding $1.2 billion.

Nathan also served as Commander, Walter Reed National Military Medical Center and Navy Medicine, National Capital Area where he was the Navy component commander to the largest military medical integration and construction project in DOD history.

== Memberships and awards ==
Nathan is board certified and holds Fellow status in the American College of Physicians and the American College of Healthcare Executives. He also holds an appointment as Clinical Professor of Medicine at the Uniformed Services University of the Health Sciences. He is a recipient of the American Hospital Association “Excellence in Leadership” award for the Federal Sector.

Nathan’s personal awards include the Navy Distinguished Service Medal (1); Legion of Merit (5); Meritorious Service Medal (2); Navy Commendation Medal, and Navy Achievement Medal (2).
