= Billy Whelan (Scottish footballer) =

Scottish footballer (1906–1982

Personal information
- Full name: William Whelan
- Date of birth: 20 February 1906
- Place of birth: Airdrie, Scotland
- Date of death: 1982 (aged 76)
- Place of death: North Dorset, England
- Height: 5 ft 9 in (1.75 m)
- Positions: Full back; wing half

Senior career*
Years	Team	Apps	(Gls)
- Gartsherrie Athletic
- Coatbridge
1927–1932	Sunderland	19	(0)
1932–1933	Southend United	8	(0)
1933–1935	Darlington	10	(0)
- * Club domestic league appearances and goals

William Whelan (20 February 1906 – 1982) was a Scottish footballer who played as a full back or wing half. He played for junior clubs in Scotland and for Sunderland, Southend United and Darlington in the English Football League.

== Life and career ==
Whelan was born in Airdrie. He played football for junior club Gartsherrie Athletic. When his employment took him to England in 1927, a trial was arranged for him with First Division club Sunderland, and his performance in a match for their "A" team in April earned him a contract for the coming season.

He made his first-team debut on 7 September 1927, replacing the unavailable Arthur Andrews at left half in a 4–2 win at home to Birmingham. The Derby Daily Telegraph wrote that although "his promotion has been rather quick, his play suggests that he will be making his name when he has matured a little. He knows how to pass a ball, but must quicken in recovery." He played again two weeks later, in a 3–2 defeat at home to Burnley, this time at right half. The same column noted that Burnley's attack flourished on their right side, while they made little impact against Whelan, a player of "fine physique [who] makes grand use of the ball". He had a run in the first team of five matches in three weeks in March 1928, but was unable to establish himself as a regular.

He played only once the following season, and three times in 1929–30, which included appearances at left back; the Portsmouth Evening News suggested that he would be a more than adequate substitute in that position for Ernie England, as he "always has better length in his kicking, and tackles well, though is not so good in front of goal as England." He also assisted the reserve team to their fourth consecutive North-Eastern League title. He was one of numerous retained players initially reluctant to re-sign on reduced terms, but soon did so. In 1930–31, Whelan was a regular at full back for the reserves in the North-Eastern League, and played eight First Division matches, including the last five of the season. The Sunderland Echo's "Argus" described his performance against Chelsea as that of a "plodder" who would do better if he played the ball along the ground rather than lofting his forward passes, and that in the next match as "much below the standard of the rest of the side". Nevertheless, he was again retained for another season, though he played no more first-team football.

Listed for transfer in April 1932, he signed for Third Division South club Southend United within days; "Argus" wrote that as "one of those die-hard types of a footballer, Whelan ought to do well in Third Division football", and that some fans thought he had "not been fully appreciated" at Sunderland. Whelan made only eight appearances for Southend – when tried as a stand-in for left-back Dave Robinson, he was apparently not a success – and having failed to agree terms for the coming season, left the club on a free transfer. Whelan's five years' service to Sunderland had entitled him to a benefit, and an agreement was reached that in lieu of such benefit they would pay any transfer fee due to Southend should he choose to leave. Although he had offers from Second Division clubs in the south of England, he opted to return to the north east, nearer to his wife's Sunderland roots, where he signed for Darlington of the Third Division North. He sustained an injury in August that kept him out for several months, had a run of games at the end of the season and was retained for 1934–35. He began the new campaign as part of a resolute defence against York City, but left the club at the end of that season having made just ten league appearances.

In 1949, Whelan was reported as living within a few miles of Yeovil, Somerset, in the south-west of England. He died in 1982, aged 76, in North Dorset.
