= William Clarence Braisted =

American surgeon, Surgeon General of the United States Navy

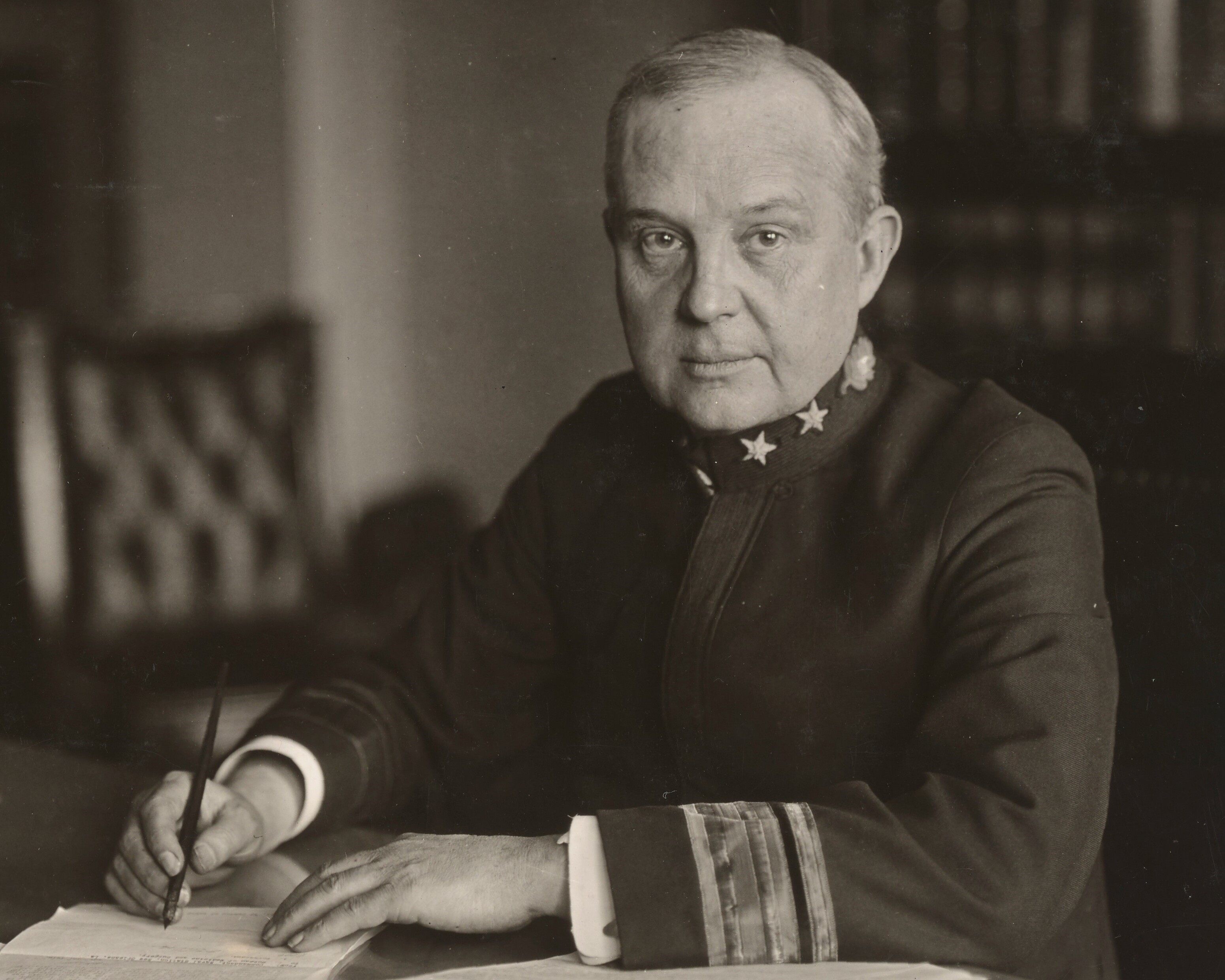

William Clarence Braisted (9 October 1864 – 17 January 1941) was an American surgeon. He was born in Toledo, Ohio, died at home in West Chester, Pennsylvania, and is buried at Arlington National Cemetery. He graduated from the University of Michigan with a Bachelor of Pharmacy degree in 1883 and from the Columbia University College of Physicians and Surgeons with a Doctor of Medicine degree in 1886. He was the Surgeon General of the United States Navy from 1914 to 1920 and the president of the American Medical Association from 1920 to 1921.

After completing his medical degree, Braisted interned at Bellevue Hospital in New York City. He then practiced medicine in Detroit, Michigan from 1888 to 1890. Braisted joined the Navy as an assistant surgeon on 24 September 1890 and retired from active duty on 29 November 1920 after thirty years of service.
