= Michael L. Cowan =

34th Surgeon General of the United States Navy

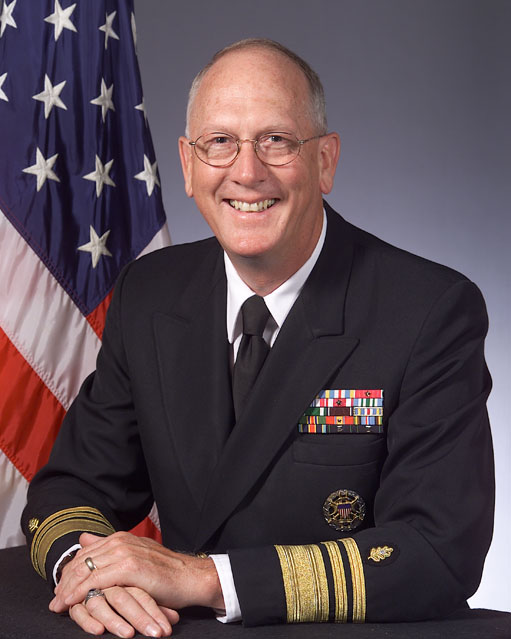
- Born: Michael Lynn Cowan; December 22, 1944; Hays, Kansas, U.S.
- Died: December 10, 2023 (aged 78); Bethesda, Maryland, U.S.
- Education: University of Colorado Boulder; Washington University School of Medicine (MD)
- Military career
- Allegiance: United States
- Branch: United States Navy
- Service years: 1971–2004
- Rank: Vice Admiral
- Commands: Surgeon General of the United States Navy; Naval Hospital Camp Lejeune
- Conflicts: Somalia
- Awards: Legion of Merit (2)

Michael L. Cowan (December 22, 1944 – December 10, 2023) was an American navy admiral who served as the 34th Surgeon General of the United States Navy.

== Early life and education ==
Michael L. Cowan was born in Hays, Kansas, and raised in Fort Morgan, Colorado. He attended the University of Colorado Boulder from 1962 to 1965 and obtained his medical degree from the Washington University School of Medicine in 1969. He began postgraduate training in Internal Medicine at Temple University in Philadelphia before receiving his invitation from selective service to enter the U.S. military.

== Naval career ==
Cowan entered the United States Navy as an ensign in 1971. His first assignment was Naval Hospital Camp Lejeune, North Carolina where he served for one year. In 1972, Cowan transferred to the Naval Hospital Bethesda, [Maryland] to continue Residency and Fellowship training in Internal Medicine, Hematology and Oncology (1972–1975).

After completion of his Fellowship, and a brief assignment at Naval Hospital Jacksonville (1975–1976), Cowan reported to Naval Hospital Rota, Spain where he served as Chief of Internal Medicine, and later Chief of Outpatient Services (1976–1979). After returning to the United States in 1979, Cowan was assigned as Chief of Clinical Investigations with the Navy Malaria Vaccine research team at the Naval Medical Research Institute (NMRI) in Bethesda, Maryland. In this role, he was responsible for overseeing clinical studies on Falciparum Malaria vaccine development.

In August 1982, Cowan reported to the Uniformed Services University of Health Sciences (USUHS) as Deputy Chair, Department of Military and Emergency Medicine. At USUHS he was uniquely responsible for administering Field Training Exercises known as "Bushmaster." This was the signature course at USUHS that distinguishes its curriculum from all other medical schools.

After his tenure at USUHS (1982–1985) and a tour of the Bureau of Medicine and Surgery (BUMED), where he served as Medical Corps Career Plans Officer (1985-1986), Cowan was selected as a Senior Research Fellow at the National War College (1986–1987). Using a Southern California Earthquake scenario, Cowan made 10 recommendations for a national response involving the military, Federal Emergency Management Agency (FEMA), U.S. Public Health Service (USPHS), and Veterans Affairs (VA) in case over 50,000 people in a single location needed hospitalization. His draft proposal was received by the Assistant Secretary of Defense (Health Affairs) who brought him aboard the Health Affairs staff as Special Assistant for the National Disaster Medical System (1987–1989).

Cowan reported to Naval Hospital Beaufort, South Carolina in 1989 where he served as Executive Officer (1989-1991). In July 1991, he was assigned to be Force Medical Officer, Naval Surface Forces Pacific Command, Coronado, California (1991–1993). During this period, he was assigned to be Task Force Surgeon for Operation Restore Hope in Somalia (December 1992 to March 1993).

Cowan reported to Naval Hospital Camp Lejeune, North Carolina in 1993 where he served as Commanding Officer (1993–1996). This assignment was followed by service as: Commander, Defense Medical Readiness Training Institute (DMRTI), Fort Sam Houston, Texas (1996–1997); Deputy Director for Medical Readiness (Joint Staff Surgeon), Joint Chiefs of Staff (1997–1999); Chief of Staff, Office of Assistant Secretary of Defense for Health Affairs (OASD[HA]) (1999–2000); Deputy Director and Chief Operating Officer, TRICARE Management Activity, Department of Defense (2000–2001).

In August 2001, Cowan was promoted to Vice Admiral and appointed the Surgeon General of the Navy and Chief of BUMED. As Surgeon General, Admiral Cowan served at the helm of Navy Medicine during the attacks of September 11 to the start of the wars in Iraq and Afghanistan. He served in this role until August 2004.

Cowan died in Bethesda, Maryland, on December 10, 2023, at the age of 78.
