= William Whelan (surgeon) =

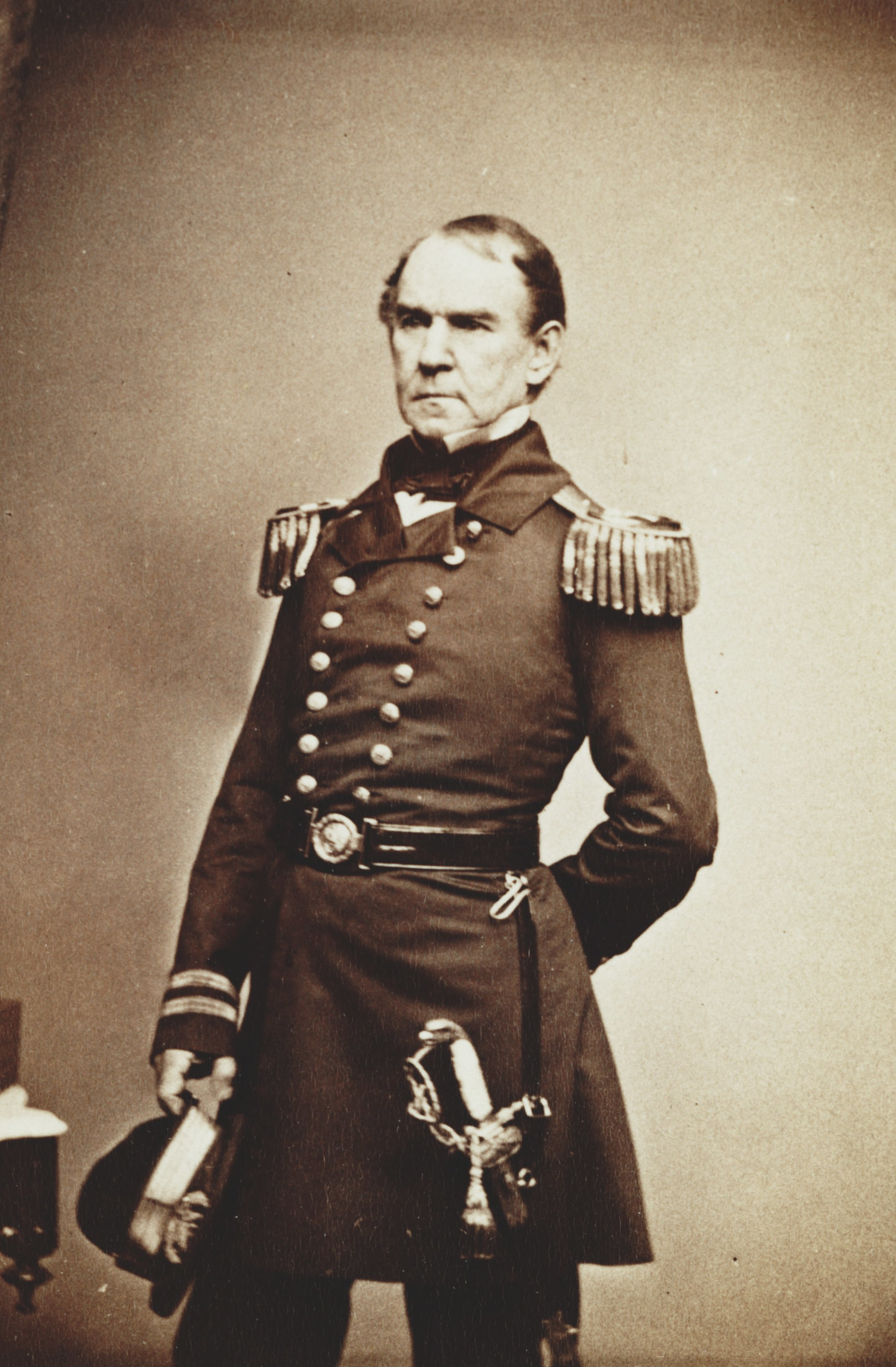
- Born: September 1808; Philadelphia, Pennsylvania
- Died: 11 June 1865 (aged 56); Washington, D.C.
- Military career
- Allegiance: United States of America
- Branch: United States Navy
- Service years: 1828−1865
- Rank: Surgeon

William Whelan (September 1808 – 11 June 1865) was the third Chief of the Bureau of Medicine and Surgery of the United States Department of the Navy.

== Biography ==
Whelan was born September 1808, in Philadelphia. Upon his graduation from the University of Pennsylvania in 1828, Dr. Whelan was commissioned a surgeon's mate in the U.S. Navy (25 March 1828). His service included duty in the West Indian Squadron, Naval Hospital, Pensacola, Florida, where he was on duty during the prevalence there of smallpox and yellow fever, at Naval Hospital Chelsea, Massachusetts, and the Navy Yard, Philadelphia. He was promoted passed assistant surgeon in 1834 and was commissioned surgeon on 9 February 1837. From 1837 to 1840, he served in the Pacific aboard USS Falmouth. From 1843 to 1845 he served as fleet surgeon in the Mediterranean Squadron and again from 1849 to 1852. He was appointed chief of the Bureau of Medicine and Surgery 23 September 1853, by the president, Franklin Pierce, and confirmed by Congress 23 January 1854. He held this office until his death 11 June 1865. He was thus chief of bureau during the American Civil War and the troubled period that preceded that conflict. The heavy responsibilities connected with the expansion of the Navy Medical Department and the increase of facilities necessary to meet the urgent demands made by the war, were borne to him.

Among the highlights of his career as chief are:

- The construction and establishment of the naval hospitals at Annapolis, MD (1853) and at Memphis, TN, Mound City, IL, and New Bern, NC in the Civil War.
- The establishment of the Naval Laboratory in Brooklyn, New York. The lab, headed by Surgeon Benjamin F. Bache and Passed Assistant Surgeon Edward R. Squibb, experimented with the production of chloroform and ether anesthesia. Squibb's major contribution was providing the Navy Medical Department with a reliable source of pure pharmaceuticals. In 1857, Dr. Squibb resigned from the Navy and founded the pharmaceutical house that bears his name.
- Establishment of the first Navy hospital ship, USS Red Rover in 1862.
