= Woody =

Woody may refer to:

== Biology ==
- Pertaining to wood, a plant tissue and material
- Woody plant, a plant with a rigid stem containing wood
- Pertaining to woodland, land covered with trees

== People and fictional characters ==
- Woody (name), a list of people and fictional characters with the given name, nickname or surname
- Woody (singer), stage name of South Korean singer Kim Sang-woo (born 1992)
- DJ Woody (born 1977), British DJ and turntablist
- Woody (Toy Story), the main character in the Toy Story franchise
- Woody, a character from the animated web series Battle for Dream Island

== Places ==
- Woody, California, United States, an unincorporated community
- Woody, Texas, United States, a ghost town
- Woody Bay (disambiguation)
- Woody Gap, Georgia, United States
- Woody Island (disambiguation)
- Woody Point (disambiguation)

== Other uses ==
- Wild Woody, a 1995 video game for Sega CD
- Woody, the working title of the British television sitcom SunTrap
- Woody, the codename of version 3.0 of the Debian Linux operating system
- The Woody, a fictional adult film award in the Family Guy episode "Brian Does Hollywood"

== See also ==
- Wood (disambiguation)
- Woods (disambiguation)
- Woodie (disambiguation)
- Woodies (disambiguation)
- Woodrow (disambiguation)
- Woody's (disambiguation)
- Wu Di (disambiguation)
- Woody Woodpecker (disambiguation)
