= Wood (disambiguation) =

Wood is a natural material produced by the growth of plants, mainly trees and shrubs.

Wood or The Wood may also refer to:

== Places ==
=== United States ===
- Wood, Iowa, an unincorporated community
- Wood, Michigan, a ghost town
- Wood, Missouri, an unincorporated community
- Wood, North Carolina, an unincorporated community
- Wood, Pennsylvania, an unincorporated community
- Wood, South Dakota, a town
- Wood, West Virginia, an unincorporated community
- Wood, Wisconsin, a town
- Wood Creek (Mohawk River), in West Schuyler, New York, U.S.
- Wood County (disambiguation)
- Wood Township (disambiguation), several townships

=== Elsewhere ===
- The Wood, New Zealand, a suburb of Nelson, South Island, New Zealand
- The Wood, Surbiton, a public park in Kingston upon Thames, London, England

== People ==
- List of people with surname Wood
- Wood (surname)
- Wood (Kent cricketer, 1789), English cricketer
- Wood (Kent cricketer, 1828), English cricketer
- Wood Boulden (1811–1876), American judge
- Wood B. Kyle (1915–2000), U.S. Marine Corps Major General

== Arts, entertainment, and media ==
=== Music ===
- Wood (Moxy Früvous album)
- Wood (Widespread Panic album)
- The Wood (soundtrack), a soundtrack album from the 1999 film
- "Wood" (song), a song by Taylor Swift (2025)
- "Wood", a song by Juliana Hatfield from Whatever, My Love (2015)
- "Wood", a song by Second Person from The Elements (2007)
- Woodwind instrument, also called wood

=== Radio stations ===
- WOOD (AM), a radio station in Grand Rapids, Michigan
- WOOD-FM, a radio station in Muskegon, Michigan

=== Other arts, entertainment, and media ===
- The Wood, a 1999 American coming of age film
- The Wood (Max Ernst), a 1927 painting
- Wood (magazine), an American woodworking periodical
- WOOD-TV, a television station in Grand Rapids, Michigan
- "The Wood" (Slacker Cats), a television episode
- "Wood", 2nd episode of Servant (TV series)

== Ships ==
- USS Wood (AP-101) or USS Leedstown (APA-56), a transport later reclassified as an attack transport launched in 1943
- USS Wood (DD-317), a destroyer in commission from 1919 to 1930
- USS William M. Wood, a list of ships

== Other uses ==
- Wood (crater), a lunar impact crater
- Wood (festival), an annual folk and roots music festival, and environmental gathering
- Wood (golf), a type of club used in golf
- Wood (wuxing), one of the five Chinese elements
- Woodland or wood, or woods, a small forest
- Wood, the trading name of John Wood Group, a multinational energy services company

== See also ==
- Justice Wood (disambiguation)
- Wood Lake (disambiguation)
- Wood River (disambiguation)
- Woodie (disambiguation)
- Woods (disambiguation)
- Woody (disambiguation)
