= Woodrow (name) =

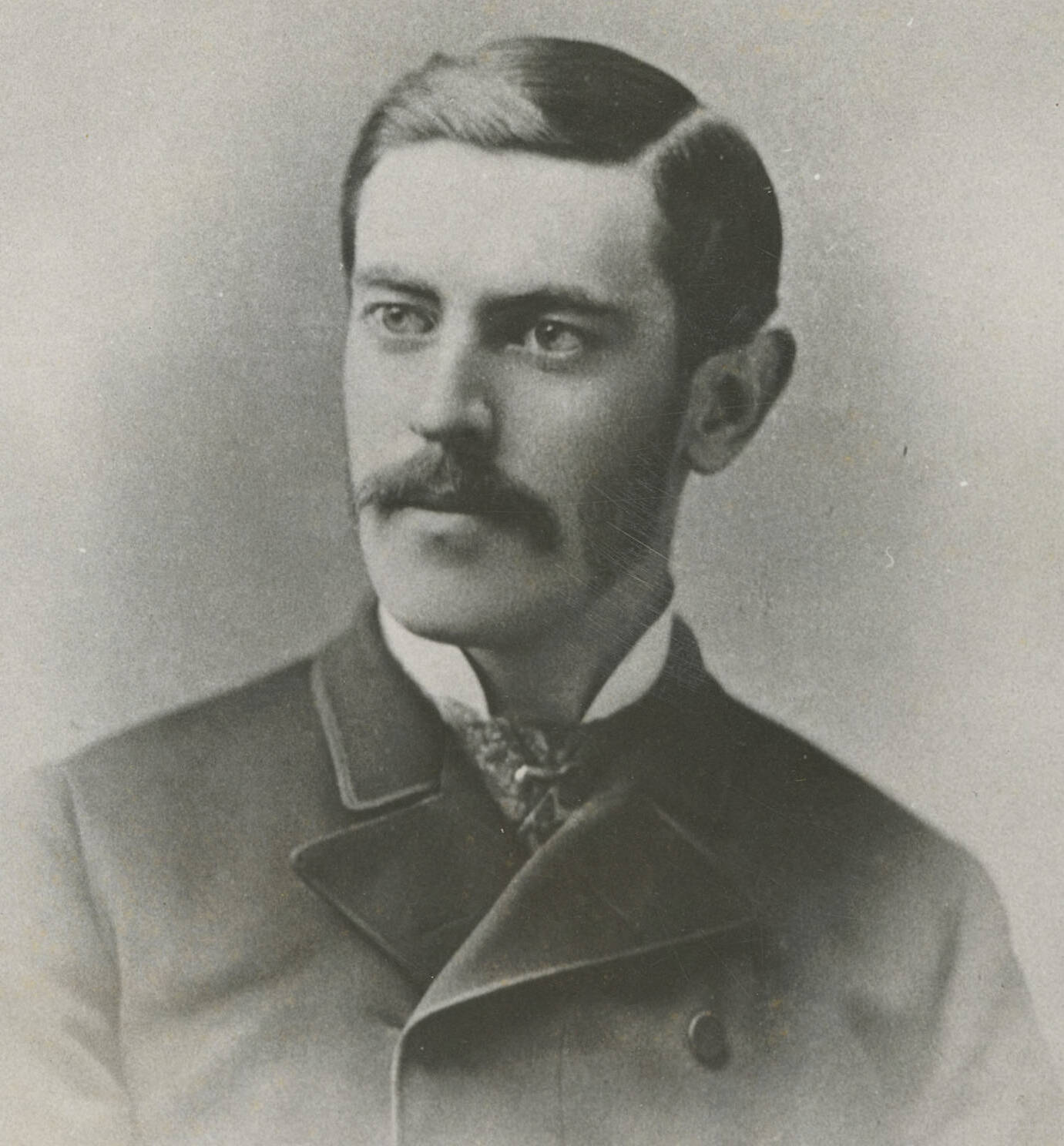
- Portrait of Woodrow Wilson in 1881, shortly after he began using his mother's maiden name in lieu of his given name
- Gender: masculine
- Language: English

Origin
- Languages: 1. Middle English; 2. Old English
- Derivation: 1. wode + reue 2. wudu + rǣw, rāw
- Meaning: "wood" + "row", "row of houses"

Other names
- Nickname: Woody

Woodrow is a male English given name and surname. The name is derived from the Middle English wode + reue and the Old English wudu + rǣw, rāw, literally meaning "wood" and "row", "row of houses". The name was originally a surname. It may have been toponymic, referring to people who lived near a row of trees, in a row of houses in the woods, or in particular places, such as Wood Row in Hatfield Broad Oak.

Woodrow's use as a given name became popular because of the United States president Woodrow Wilson, who began to use his mother's maiden name after college in lieu of his given name Thomas. He wanted to emphasize his family connection and he believed that "Woodrow Wilson" was more dignified than "Thomas Wilson".

The pet form of Woodrow is Woody.

== People with the name Woodrow ==
=== Given name ===
- Woodrow A. Abbott (1919–1994), United States Air Force officer who served as director of intelligence, J-2, and inspector general of the U.S. Readiness Command, which was then headquartered at MacDill Air Force Base
- Woodrow Adams (1917–1988), American Delta blues guitarist and harmonica player
- Woodrow M. Allen (born 1943), American politician from Maryland
- Woodrow Borah (1912–1999), U.S. historian of colonial Mexico, whose research contributions on demography, economics, and social structure made him a major Latin Americanist
- Woodrow Chambliss (1914–1981), American character actor who appeared in both feature films and television
- Woodrow Hamilton (born 1992), American football defensive tackle for the Carolina Panthers of the National Football League (NFL). He played college football at Ole Miss
- Woodrow W. Jones (1914–2002), United States Representative from North Carolina and a United States District Judge of the United States District Court for the Western District of North Carolina
- Woodrow Lawrence, swimmer at the 1996 Summer Olympics in Atlanta for his country of birth Dominica. Woody finished 60th out of 63 competitors in 50 meter freestyle, with a time of 27.88 seconds
- Woodrow Lloyd (1913–1972), Canadian politician and educator
- Woodrow Lowe (1954–2025), American football player
- Woodrow Wilson Mann (1916–2002), American politician who was the mayor of the capital city of Little Rock, Arkansas, from 1956 to 1957
- Woodrow M. Melvin (1912–1994), American politician in the state of Florida.
- Woodrow Phoenix, British comics artist, writer, editorial illustrator, graphic designer, font designer and author of children's books
- Woodrow Bradley Seals (1917–1990), United States District Judge of the United States District Court for the Southern District of Texas
- Woodrow Stanley (1950–2022), American politician, Democratic Party politician, is a former member of the Michigan House of Representatives from the 34th District. He was a former mayor of Flint, until he was recalled from office in 2002
- Woodrow Swancutt (1915–1993), major general in the United States Air Force
- Woodrow West (born 1985), Belizean professional footballer who plays as a goalkeeper for Honduras Progreso
- Woodrow Whitlow Jr., associate administrator for Mission Support at NASA. He was appointed to this position by NASA administrator Charles Bolden on February 3, 2010. Prior to this, he was director of the NASA Glenn Research Center in Cleveland Ohio
- Woodrow Wilson (1856–1924), 28th president of the United States from 1913 to 1921
- Woodrow Wilson (disambiguation), various people

==== With nickname Woody ====
- Woody Guthrie (Woodrow Wilson Guthrie, 1912–1967), US musician
- Woody Hayes (Wayne Woodrow Hayes, 1913–1987), US football coach
- Woody Harrelson (Woodrow Tracy Harrelson, born 1961), US actor

=== Surname ===
- Alan Woodrow (born 1952), Canadian opera singer
- Allan Woodrow (disambiguation), various people
- Bill Woodrow (born 1948), British sculptor
- Cauley Woodrow (born 1994), English professional footballer who plays as a forward for League One club Barnsley. He made his debut in the Football League for Southend United in September 2013
- George Marshall Woodrow (1846–1911), British botanist
- Herbert Woodrow (1883–1974), American psychologist. He served as president of the American Psychological Association in 1941 and was a faculty member at several universities. He was a first cousin of Woodrow Wilson
- James Woodrow (disambiguation), multiple people
- Joash Woodrow (1927–2006), reclusive English artist
- John Woodrow (1919–1988), British Army officer
- Julian Woodrow (born 1996), American singer and songwriter. He is half of the duo "Take 2" (formerly known as "Blackberry Jam"), along with his brother Adrian Chirtea
- Keith Woodrow (1927–1997), Scottish native who rose from being a former constable in Argyllshire in 1954 to Senior Superintendent of the colonial Royal Hong Kong Police Force at the time of his retirement in 1975
- Luke Woodrow (1921–2000), Roman Catholic priest, realtor and politician in Newfoundland. He represented Bay of Islands in the Newfoundland House of Assembly from 1975 to 1985
- Mark Woodrow (born 1980), English rugby union player-coach for Dings Crusaders currently playing in the English National League 3 South West
- Polly Palfrey Woodrow (1906–1997), American tennis player
- Ralph Woodrow, Evangelical Christian minister, speaker, and author
- Steven Woodrow, American politician

=== Fictional characters ===
- Woody Boyd (Woodrow Huckleberry Tiberius Boyd), character on Cheers, played by Woody Harrelson
- Captain Woodrow F. Call, Texas Rangers. Main character in Larry McMurtry's Lonesome Dove, played by Tommy Lee Jones in the TV miniseries.
- Woodrow, a Simon Kidgits character developed by Simon Brand Ventures
- Woodrow Wilson Smith (Lazarus Long) "Time Enough for Love" by Robert A Heinlein.
