= Woodie =

Woodie may refer to:

- Woodie, a wooden roller coaster with running rails made of flattened steel strips mounted on a laminated wooden track
- Ryan Mitchell Wood, known as "Woodie", rapper
- Woodie, the first Fender amplifier
- Woodie, slang for a penile erection
- Woodie (car body style), a type of car with a rear portion of the bodywork made of wood
- Woodie Awards, a semi-annual awards show on mtvU
- Woodie's DIY, an Irish DIY store chain operated by the Grafton Group
- The Woodies, nickname for longtime Australian tennis doubles partners Todd Woodbridge and Mark Woodforde
- Woody (name), a list which includes people with the given name Woodie

== See also ==
- Wood (disambiguation)
- Woodies (disambiguation)
- Woody (disambiguation)
- Wu Di (disambiguation)
