= USS William M. Wood =

USS William M. Wood has been the name of more than one United States Navy ship, and may refer to:

- USS William M. Wood (DE-287), a destroyer escort cancelled in March 1944
- USS William M. Wood (DE-557), a destroyer escort cancelled in June 1944
- USS William M. Wood (DD-715), a destroyer in commission from 1945 to 1976
