= Admiral Wood =

Admiral Wood may refer to:

- Arthur Wood (Royal Navy officer) (1875–1961), British Royal Navy rear admiral
- Andrew Wood of Largo (died 1515), Lord High Admiral of Scotland
- James Athol Wood (1756–1829), British Royal Navy rear admiral
- James Wood (Canadian admiral) (born 1934), Royal Canadian Navy vice admiral
- Spencer S. Wood (1861–1940), U.S. Navy rear admiral

== See also ==
- William Maxwell Wood (1809–1880), Surgeon General of the United States Navy
- David B. Woods (fl. 2010s), U.S. Navy rear admiral
- Wilfrid Woods (1906–1975), British Royal Navy admiral
