= Allan Woodrow =

Allan Woodrow may refer to:

- Allan Lee Woodrow (1886–1966), Canadian Senator
- Allan Woodrow (author) (born 1964), American author of children's literature

== See also ==
- Alan Woodrow (born 1952), Canadian opera singer
