= Woodies =

Woodies may refer to:

- The Woodies, nickname of men's tennis doubles team Todd Woodbridge and Mark Woodforde
- Woodie's, an Irish DIY shop chain operated by the Grafton Group
- MTV Woodies, a music awards show by college channel mtvU
- Woodward & Lothrop, a defunct department store
- Woodies, a nickname for Woodbine cigarettes
- Woodroofe, a South Australian soft drink brandname and historic company

== See also ==
- Woodie (disambiguation)
- Woody (disambiguation)
- Woody's (disambiguation)
- Woods (disambiguation)
- Cuisenaire rods
