= Woody's =

Woody's may refer to:

- Woody's Chicago Style, an American fast food chain.
- Woody's Bar-B-Q, a Florida-based restaurant with 34 restaurants on the Eastern portion of the United States.
- Woody's (Toronto), one of the world's most famous gay bars, in Toronto, Ontario.

== See also ==
- Woodie's DIY, a DIY store chain operated by the Grafton Group
- Woody (disambiguation)
- Woodies (disambiguation)
- Woods (disambiguation)
