= Vũ Hoàng đế =

Vũ Hoàng đế or Emperor Vũ may refer to:

- Lê Trung Tông (Revival Lê dynasty) (1535–1556), Later Lê emperor
- Nguyễn Phúc Khoát (1714–1765), Nguyễn lord, posthumously honored as an emperor
- Quang Trung (1753–1792), emperor of the Tây Sơn dynasty

== See also ==
- Emperor Wu (disambiguation)
