= Wuzong =

Wuzong (武宗) is the temple name of several Chinese emperors. It may refer to:

- Emperor Wuzong of Tang (814–846), who reigned over Tang China between 840 and 846
- Külüg Khan, Emperor Wuzong of Yuan (1281–1311), who reigned over the Yuan Dynasty between 1307 and 1311
- Zhengde Emperor (1491–1521), of the Ming Dynasty, who served between 1505 and 1521

== See also ==
- Emperor Wu (disambiguation)
