= Woodrow, West Virginia =

Woodrow, West Virginia may refer to:

- Woodrow, Hampshire and Morgan Counties, West Virginia, an unincorporated community along the border of Hampshire and Morgan Counties
- Woodrow, Pocahontas County, West Virginia, an unincorporated community in Pocahontas County
