= Backwoods =

Backwoods generally refers to a woodland or forest. It may also refer to:

== Media ==
- "Backwoods" (song), a 2009 song by Justin Moore from the album Justin Moore
- "Backwoods", a song from the Red Hot Chili Peppers' 1987 album The Uplift Mofo Party Plan
- Backwoods (film), a 2008 film starring Haylie Duff
- The Backwoods, English title of the 2007 film Bosque de Sombras

== Other uses ==
- Backwoods, a colloquial term for areas of rural poverty, particularly in the US
- Backwoods Smokes, a cigar brand

== See also ==
- Backwood (horse), a thoroughbred racehorse; see List of Melbourne Cup winners
- Woodcraft, skills and experience in matters relating to living and thriving in the backwoods
- Woods (disambiguation)
- Woodlands (disambiguation)
- Backcountry
