= Woodrow =

Woodrow may refer to:

== People ==
- Woodrow (name), a given name and a surname

== Places ==
=== Canada ===
- Woodrow, Saskatchewan, an unincorporated community

=== United Kingdom ===
- Woodrow, Buckinghamshire, England
- Woodrow, Cumbria, England
- Woodrow, Worcestershire, a district of Redditch, England

=== United States ===
- Woodrow, Colorado, an unincorporated town
- Woodrow, Minnesota, an unincorporated community
- Woodrow, Staten Island, New York, a neighborhood in New York City
- Woodrow, Utah, an unincorporated community
- Woodrow, Hampshire and Morgan Counties, West Virginia, an unincorporated community
- Woodrow, Pocahontas County, West Virginia, an unincorporated community
- Woodrow Township, Beltrami County, Minnesota, a township
- Woodrow Township, Cass County, Minnesota, a township
- Woodrow, Texas, an unincorporated community

== Other ==
- Woodrow (automobile), a British cyclecar
- Woodrow (television), a dog on the Australian television show Simon Townsend's Wonder World
