= Woody Wilson =

Woody Wilson may refer to:

- Woody Wilson (writer), writer of the comic strips Judge Parker and Rex Morgan, M.D. since 1990
- Woody Wilson, former bass guitar player for the band Alive N Kickin'
- Woodie Wilson (1925–1994), racing driver

== See also ==
- Woodrow Wilson (disambiguation)
