= Wood River Township =

Wood River Township may refer to one of the following places in the United States:

- Wood River Township, Madison County, Illinois
- Wood River Township, Custer County, Nebraska
- Wood River Township, Hall County, Nebraska

== See also ==
- Wood River (disambiguation)
