= Adrian Chirtea =

American singer and songwriter

- Born: December 30, 1996 (age 29); Sunderland, Vermont
- Occupations: Singer, Songwriter
- Instrument: Vocals
- Years active: 2011–present
- Label: Unsigned
- Website: www.take2official.com

Adrian Tiger Chirtea (born December 30, 1996) is an American singer and songwriter. He is half of the duo Take 2, along with his brother Julian Woodrow.

== Biography ==
Chirtea is son of Heather Chirtea and Gordon Woodrow. He has a twin brother little more than 10 minutes, Julian Woodrow. Although twins have a different last name because since Adrian was younger he always went by his mother's last name and Julian by his father's.

== Career ==
Adrian and his brother have been singing together since they were little and enjoy harmonizing with each other today. They formed a group, consisting of the two called Blackberry Jam. Under this name, they auditioned for the X-Factor in the fall of 2011 making a video of them singing the song, Hallelujah and that got them into X Factor's Boot Camp but were eliminated during the competition.

In 2012 they play small shows in their hometown in Vermont and post new covers on YouTube. They tried out for X-Factor again and their audition tape was their Payphone video (That can be found on their YouTube channel) which got them through the first 3 rounds. They also tried out for America's Got Talent and The Voice.

In 2013 they win a scholarship to the 2013 Prodigy Camp Project, a summer program that brings together 20 of the most promising teenage songwriters and filmmakers to hone their craft.
