= Woody Woodpecker (disambiguation) =

Woody Woodpecker is an animated cartoon character.

Woody Woodpecker may also refer to:

- Woody Woodpecker (franchise), the media franchise of the character
- Woody Woodpecker (1941 film)
- Woody Woodpecker (2017 film)
- Woody Woodpecker (2018 web series)

== See also ==
- Woodpecker (disambiguation)
- Woody (disambiguation)
