= Wudi =

Wudi may refer to:

- Wudi County, in Binzhou, Shandong, China
- Wudi, the atonal pinyin for the legendary Five Emperors
- Wudi, the atonal pinyin for various emperors named Wu
- Wǔdì (五帝 "Five Deities") in Chinese religion
- WUDI-LD, a defunct low-power television station (channel 27) formerly licensed to serve Myrtle Beach, South Carolina, United States
- Wudi, or Guan Yu as the "God of war"

== See also ==
- Wu Di (disambiguation)
