= HMS Andromache (1890) =

Apollo-class protected cruiser of the Royal Navy

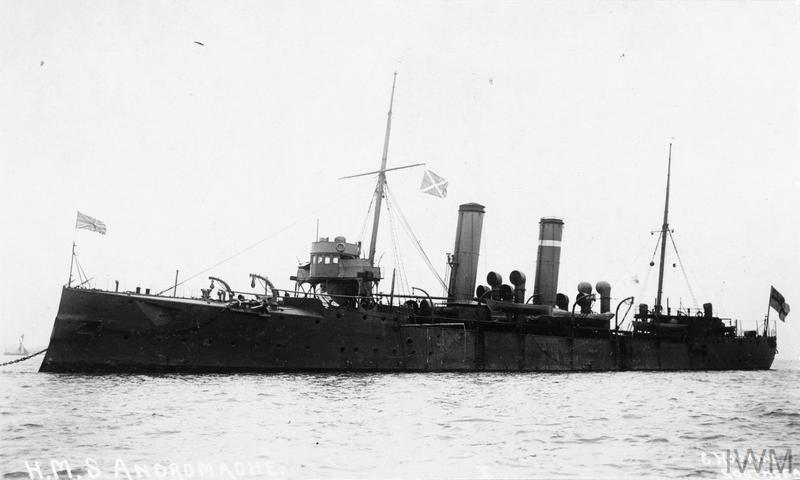
- Andromache

History

United Kingdom
- Name: HMS Andromache
- Namesake: Andromache
- Builder: Chatham Dockyard
- Laid down: May 1889
- Launched: 14 August 1890
- Commissioned: 1892
- Nickname(s): "Andy Mac"
- Fate: Sold in 1920; broken up by Autumn 1925

General characteristics
- Class & type: Apollo-class cruiser
- Displacement: 3,600 tons
- Length: 314 ft (95.7 m)
- Beam: 43.5 ft (13.3 m)
- Draught: 17.5 ft (5.3 m)
- Propulsion: twin screw triple expansion engines; from Earle's Shipbuilding
- Speed: 19.75 knots (36.58 km/h)
- Complement: 273 to 300 (Officers and Men)
- Armament: As built: 2 × QF 6-inch (152.4 mm) guns; 6 × QF 4.7-inch (120 mm) guns; 8 × 6-pounders; 2 to 4 × 14 inch torpedo tubes; Converted pre-1914 to a lightly armed minelayer.

HMS Andromache was an Apollo-class protected cruiser of the Royal Navy. William Henry White designed her, and she was built at Chatham Dockyard and launched on 14 August 1890. The total cost of construction was £186,234.

Andromache was initially allocated to A Division of the Fleet Reserve.

== History ==
Ordered under the Naval Defence Act 1889, Andromache was built in 1890 at Chatham Dockyard. She was present at the Naval Review at Spithead on 26 June 1897 in celebration of the Diamond Jubilee of Queen Victoria. On 28 February 1900, the Andromache and her sister ship Apollo reportedly had been transferred from the Medway to the Devonport Fleet Reserve. Except for the previous year's manoeuvres, Andromache had been unemployed since being built. On 27 June 1900, orders from Devonport were given for a naval mobilization to take place on Tuesday, 10 July. Commander Francis Alan Richard Bowles was appointed in command on 23 April 1902, and in June of that year she was reported to serve as Naval Reserve drill ship at North Shields. She took part in the fleet review held at Spithead on 16 August 1902 for the coronation of King Edward VII.

On 1 February 1908, the torpedo gunboat Leda collided with Andromache in Harwich harbour, and had to be beached to avoid sinking. In September 1909, the ship completed conversion to a minelayer at Chatham Dockyard. Andromache took part in naval exercises off the East coast of Britain in July–August 1910, but on the night of 1 August, the steamship Neapolitan Prince, employed as a transport during the exercises, collided with Andromache on leaving Harwich harbour, crushing boats and davits on Andromache's starboard side. In August 1914, she joined the Minelayer Squadron, after which she was reduced to harbour duties.

Andromache was paid off at Devonport on 13 September 1919 and was laid up. In August 1920, she was sold, along with her sister Apollo, to Sidney Castle and moved to Corporation Wharf in the Cattewater for demolition. The two cruisers were stripped to their hulls, but then registered as merchant vessels by Castle and offered for sale. Unsold, Andromache was broken up by Autumn 1925.

== Publications ==
- Colledge, J. J.; Warlow, Ben (2006) [1969]. Ships of the Royal Navy: The Complete Record of All Fighting Ships of the Royal Navy from the 15th Century to the Present (3rd Rev ed.). London: Chatham Publishing. ISBN 978-1-86176-281-8. OCLC 67375475.
- Gardiner, Robert; Gray, Randal, eds. (1985). Conway's All The World's Fighting Ships 1906–1921. London: Conway Maritime Press. ISBN 0-85177-245-5.
