= Woodpecker (disambiguation) =

Woodpeckers are near-passerine birds of the order Piciformes.

Woodpecker may also refer to:

- Russian Woodpecker, a type of shortwave radio interference thought to originate from the Russian Duga-3 Over-the-horizon radar transmitter
- Woodpecker, nickname of the Type 92 Heavy Machine Gun
- The Woodpeckers, one of the two Democratic Party factions in the Texas Jaybird–Woodpecker War

== Art, entertainment, and media ==
- Woodpecker (2008 film), a 2008 comedic film
- Woodpecker, a 2008 play by Jacob M. Appel
- Woodpeckers (2017 film), a 2017 film
- "Woodpeckers from Space" (song), a 1984 song by VideoKids
- Woody Woodpecker, the Universal Pictures cartoon character
- Woodpecker Wooliams, a musical project of English musician Gemma Williams
- Woodpecker, a television ident for BBC Two, first aired in 2000 (see BBC Two '1991–2001' idents)
- The Woodpecker, 1971 Polish film

== Brands ==
- Woodpecker Cider, a brand of H. P. Bulmer

== Sports ==
- The Woodpeckers (Rugby union team) British Rugby union team
- Fayetteville Woodpeckers, a Minor League Baseball team of the Carolina League

== See also ==
- Woody Woodpecker (disambiguation)
