= USS Wood (DD-317) =

Clemson-class destroyer

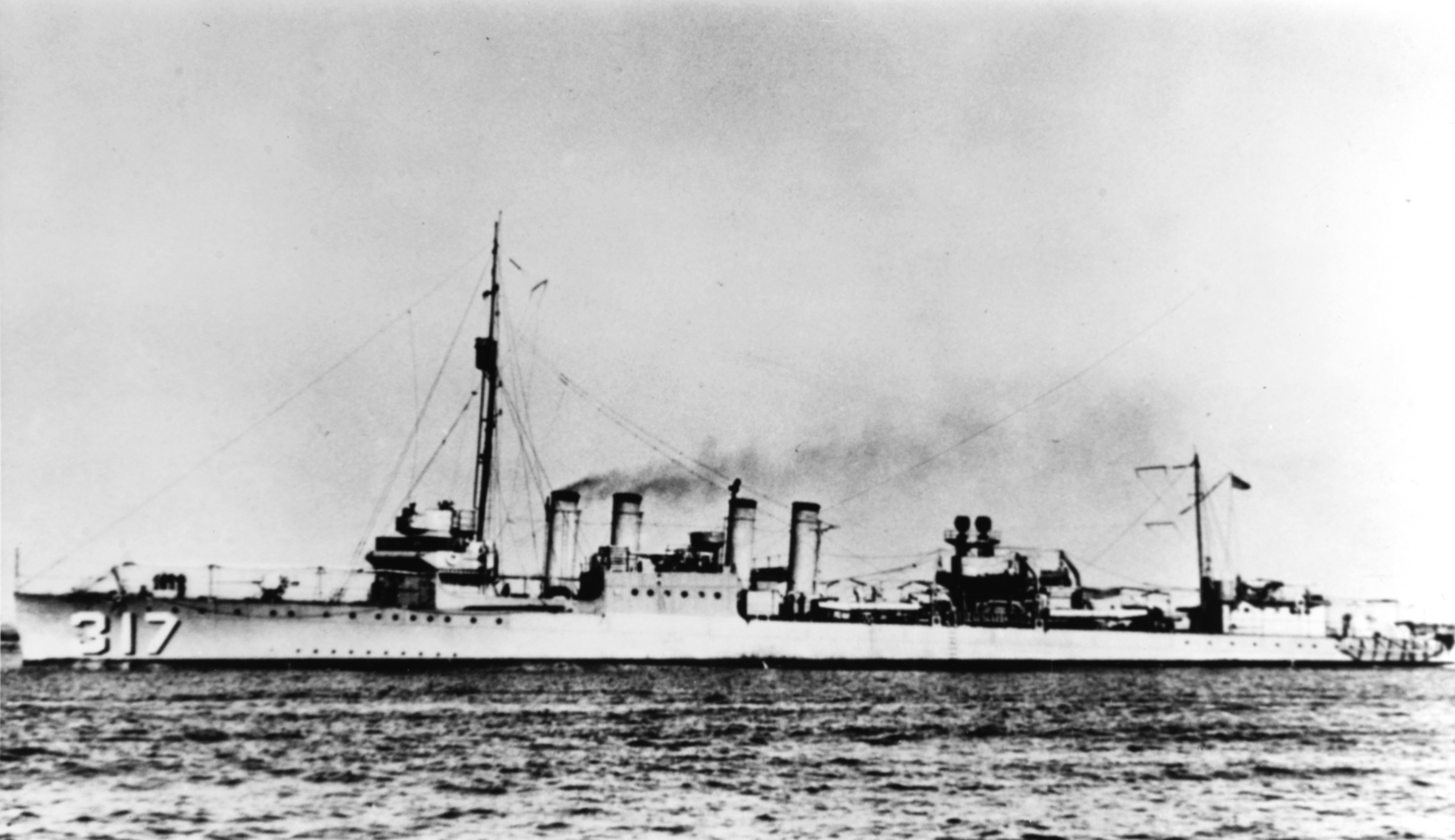

History

United States
- Namesake: William Maxwell Wood
- Builder: Bethlehem Shipbuilding Corporation, Union Iron Works, San Francisco
- Laid down: 23 January 1919
- Launched: 28 May 1919
- Commissioned: 28 January 1921
- Decommissioned: 31 March 1930
- Stricken: 22 July 1930
- Fate: Sold for scrap, 14 November 1930

General characteristics
- Class & type: Clemson-class destroyer
- Displacement: 1,215 tons
- Length: 314 feet 4 inches (95.81 m)
- Beam: 31 feet 8 inches (9.65 m)
- Draft: 9 feet 10 inches (3.00 m)
- Propulsion: 26,500 shp (20 MW); geared turbines, 2 screws
- Speed: 35 knots (65 km/h)
- Range: 4,900 nmi (9,100 km); @ 15-knot (28 km/h)
- Complement: 130 officers and enlisted
- Armament: 4 × 4 in (102 mm)/50 guns, 1 × 3 in (76 mm)/25 gun, 12 × 21 inch (533 mm) tt.

USS Wood (DD-317) was a Clemson-class destroyer in service with the United States Navy from 1921 to 1930. She was scrapped in 1931.

== History ==
Wood was the first U.S. Navy ship named after Surgeon-General William M. Wood (1809–1880). She was laid down on 23 January 1919 at San Francisco, California, by the Union Iron Works plant of the Bethlehem Shipbuilding Corporation; launched on 28 May 1919; sponsored by Mrs. George Kirkland Smith, the granddaughter of William Maxwell Wood; reclassified DD-317 on 17 July 1920; and commissioned at the Mare Island Navy Yard, Vallejo, California, on 28 January 1921.

Following commissioning, Wood underwent her trials before mooring at the Santa Fe docks, San Diego, California, where she remained as part of the "rotating reserve" into the summer of 1921. The new destroyer then spent the ensuing months, into the late spring of 1922, operating off the coast of southern California on drills and exercises, off the port of San Pedro, and the Coronado Islands.

At the end of that period of activity in June 1922, Wood shifted northward and reached Seattle, Washington, on 1 July 1922. She spent 4 July there before visiting Port Angeles, Washington, with the fleet, for exercises and maneuvers. She then conducted tactical drills and exercises in the Pacific Northwest, touching at Tacoma, Port Angeles, Bellingham, and Seattle before departing Port Angeles on 2 September, bound for Mare Island.

After taking on board ammunition at Mare Island on 5 September and 6 September, Wood put to sea, bound for San Diego, California, for a machinery overhaul. Upon completion of those repairs, the destroyer rejoined the fleet for rehearsals for short range battle practices. She then operated on various trials into November.

Over the next nine and a half years, Wood operated with the Battle Fleet in an active role, while many of her sisters lay in "Red Lead Row" awaiting the call to active service. Breaking her local operations off the west coast, Wood participated in Fleet Problems I through IX — the large scale fleet exercises that were held once a year (except in 1924, when three were held) involving most of the Fleet's active units. During the course of those maneuvers, she ranged from the Caribbean to the Panama Canal and from Hawaii to the coast of Central America. She also ventured as far north as the coast of Alaska.

A highlight of Wood's service in the autumn of 1925 was the cruise with the fleet to Australia as part of Destroyer Division 34. The destroyer subsequently took part in the search for the downed PN-9 flying boat. In March 1927, during one of the phases of Fleet Problem VII, Wood participated in the search for survivors from the lost German steamship Albatros and later that same year, from 27 June to 16 July, Wood supported American peace-keeping forces ashore on Nicaragua.

Decommissioned at San Diego on 31 March 1930, Wood was struck from the Navy list on 22 July. Her hulk was then sold for scrap on 14 November 1930.

As of 2005, no other ship in the United States Navy has been named Wood. A vessel originally named Exchequer was laid down in 1942 and briefly renamed Wood in October 1942 before being renamed USS Leedstown prior to commissioning.

== See also ==
- USS William M. Wood (DD-715), another ship named for William Wood
