= HMS Apollo (1891) =

Apollo-class cruiser

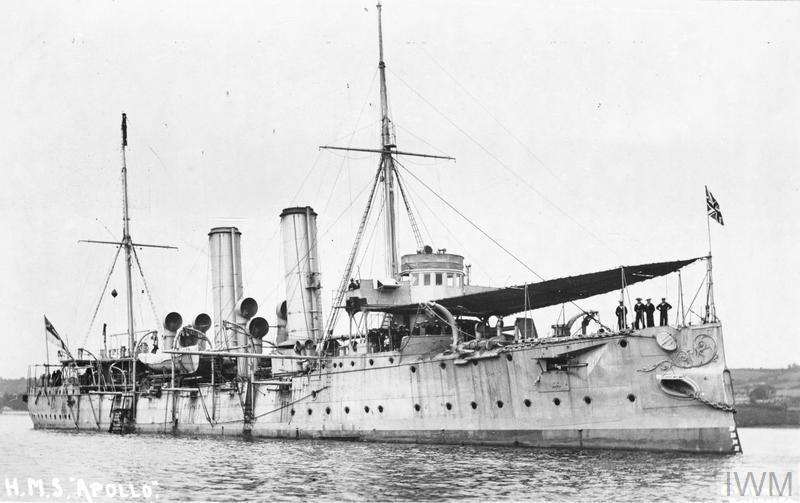
- Protected cruiser HMS Apollo

History

United Kingdom
- Name: HMS Apollo
- Builder: Chatham Dockyard
- Laid down: April 1889
- Launched: 18 February 1891
- Commissioned: 1892
- Reclassified: 1909 as a minelayer
- Fate: Sold for demolition 1920

General characteristics
- Class & type: Apollo-class cruiser
- Displacement: 3,400 long tons (3,500 t)
- Length: 314 ft (95.7 m)
- Beam: 43 ft (13.1 m)
- Draught: 17.5 ft (5.3 m)
- Propulsion: 2-shaft steam reciprocating engines; 5 boilers; 7000 ihp (natural draught); 9000 ihp (forced draught)
- Speed: 20 knots (23 mph; 37 km/h)
- Complement: 273 to 300 (Officers and Men)
- Armament: 2 × QF 6-inch (152.4 mm) guns; 6 × QF 4.7-inch (120 mm) guns; 8 × QF 6-pounder Hotchkiss guns; 4 × 5 barrel 0.45 in (11 mm) Nordenfelt machine guns; 4 × 14 in (360 mm) torpedo tubes
- Armor: Conning tower: 3 in (76 mm); Decks: 2–1.25 in (51–32 mm); Engine hatch: 5 in (130 mm)

HMS Apollo, the sixth ship of the Royal Navy to be named for the Greek god Apollo, was a second-class Apollo-class protected cruiser launched in 1891 and converted to a minelayer in 1909 along with six of her sisters. They formed a minelaying squadron in 1914–15 during the First World War, although Apollo was disarmed in 1915 and served in secondary roles until sold for breaking up in 1920.

== Armament ==
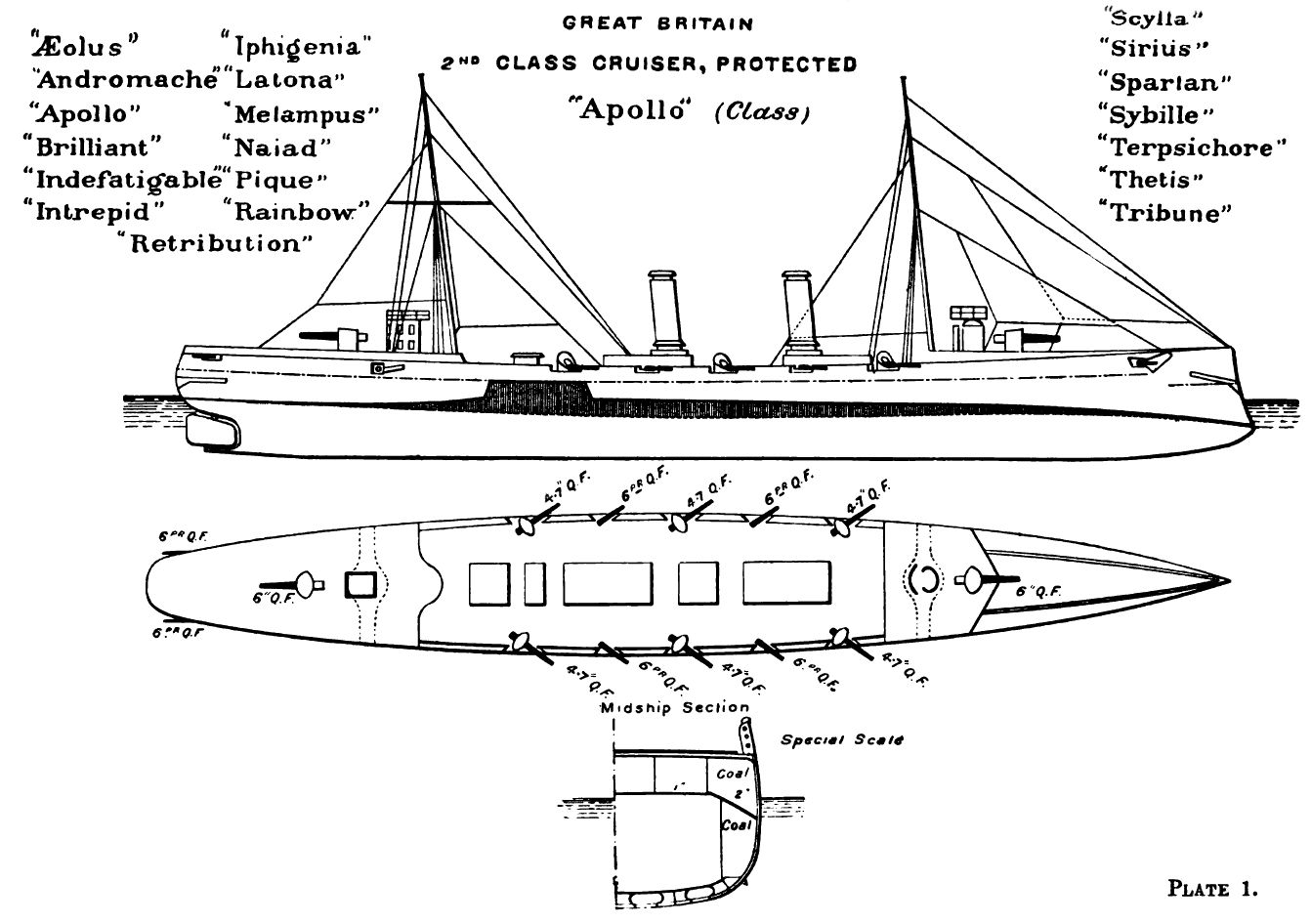
Diagram of an Apollo-class cruiser

Apollo carried two QF 6-inch (152.4 mm) guns, one on the forecastle and the other on the poop and six QF 4.7-inch (120 mm) guns mounted in the waist. Four single QF 6-pounder Hotchkiss guns were carried in the waist, two more on the forecastle and two on the poop. Two 0.45 in (11 mm) Nordenfelt 5 barrel machine guns were mounted in the forecastle and two in the poop. One QF 3-pounder Hotchkiss gun was carried for use in the ship's boats, although it was provided one mount on each side of the after end of the waist. Four 14 in (360 mm) torpedo tube were fitted, two fixed on the stem and stern, and two broadside training tubes on the upper deck aft.

She was totally disarmed when she was converted to a minelayer in 1909 at Chatham Dockyard. Mine rails were fitted on her maindeck, which required that the cabins under the poop be removed, and she could carry a hundred mines. Her after deckhouse was extended and her magazines were converted to storerooms.

When the First World War began she was given four QF 4.7-inch (120 mm) guns, but these were again removed when she was disarmed in 1915.

== Protection ==
Apollo's armored decks ranged from 2–1.25 inches (51–32 mm) in thickness and her conning tower was 3 inches (76 mm) thick. Her engine hatch was 5 inches (130 mm) thick.

== Propulsion ==
Apollo had 2-shaft steam reciprocating engines and five boilers that gave 7000 indicated horsepower (ihp) using natural draught and 9,000 ihp (6,700 kW) using forced draught. She could make 18.5 knots (21.3 mph; 34.3 km/h) using natural draught and20 knots (23 mph; 37 km/h) at forced draught. She carried 535 long tons (544 t) of coal.

== History ==
Originally under Captain Richard Poore, she came under the captaincy of Captain (later Vice Admiral) George Anson Primrose in 1893.

After a spell in the reserve, she was present at the Fleet Review for the Diamond Jubilee in 1897, and was transferred back to the reserve in 1900. In February that year she was moved from Chatham to Devonport. She took part in the fleet review held at Spithead on 16 August 1902 for the coronation of King Edward VII. In 1909 she was converted into a minelayer, and served in this role for the first year of the First World War. She and her sisters formed a squadron operating from Dover and the Nore. She was again disarmed in 1915 and either relegated to secondary roles or laid up, with Arthur Wood captaining her between 1917 and 1919.

In August 1920, Apollo was sold, along with her sister Andromache, to Sidney Castle and moved to Corporation Wharf in the Cattewater for demolition. The two cruisers were stripped to their hulls, but then registered as merchant vessels by Castle and offered for sale. Unsold, Apollo was broken up by Autumn 1925.
