= Judge Wood =

Judge Wood may refer to:

- Andrea Wood (born 1973), judge of the United States District Court for the Northern District of Illinois
- Diane Wood (born 1950), judge of the United States Court of Appeals for the Seventh Circuit
- Harlington Wood Jr. (1920–2008), judge of the United States Court of Appeals for the Seventh Circuit
- Harold Kenneth Wood (1906–1972), judge of the United States District Court for the Eastern District of Pennsylvania
- Harry E. Wood (1926–2009), judge of the United States Court of Claims and of the United States Court of Federal Claims
- John H. Wood Jr. (1916–1979), judge of the United States District Court for the Western District of Texas
- Kimba Wood (born 1944), judge of the United States District Court for the Southern District of New York
- Lisa Godbey Wood (born 1963), judge of the United States District Court for the Southern District of Georgia

== See also ==
- Judge Woods (disambiguation)
- Justice Wood (disambiguation)
