= Judge Woods =

Judge Woods may refer to:

- Charles Albert Woods (1852–1925), judge of the United States Court of Appeals for the Fourth Circuit
- George E. Woods (1923–2007), judge of the United States District Court for the Eastern District of Michigan
- Gregory H. Woods (born 1969), judge of the United States District Court for the Southern District of New York
- Henry Woods (judge) (1918–2002), judge of the United States District Court for the Eastern District of Arkansas
- William Allen Woods (1837–1901), judge of the United States Court of Appeals for the Seventh Circuit
- William Burnham Woods (1824–1887), judge of the United States Circuit Court for the Fifth Circuit prior to his appointment to the Supreme Court of the United States

== See also ==
- Judge Wood (disambiguation)
- Justice Woods (disambiguation)
