= Winchfield =

Village and parish in Hampshire, England

Coordinates: 51.26829°N 0.90055°W

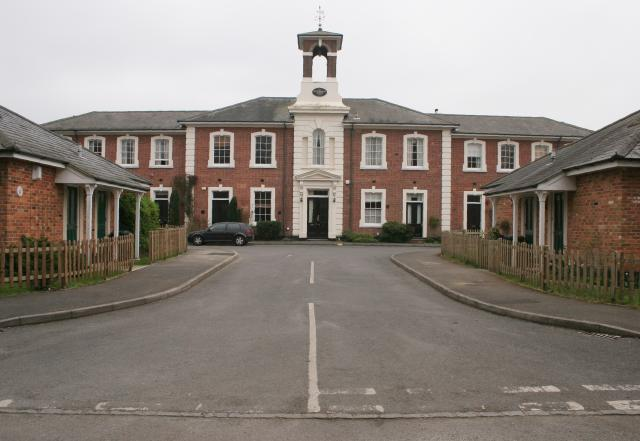
- Winchfield Court, formerly Winchfield Hospital.

- Location within Hampshire
- Population: 664 (2011 Census)
- OS grid reference: SU768527
- District: Hart
- Shire county: Hampshire
- Region: South East
- Country: England
- Sovereign state: United Kingdom
- Post town: Hook
- Postcode district: RG27
- Dialling code: 01252
- Police: Hampshire and Isle of Wight
- Fire: Hampshire and Isle of Wight
- Ambulance: South Central
- UK Parliament: North East Hampshire

Winchfield is a small village in the Hart District of Hampshire in the South-East of England. It is situated 1 mile (1.6 km) south-west of Hartley Wintney, 8 miles (13 km) east of Basingstoke, 2 miles (3.2 km) north-east of Odiham and 38 miles (61 km) west of London. It is connected to London Waterloo and Basingstoke by the South West Main Line.

Winchfield consists of a recently rebuilt village hall (in 1998), a church, a 17th century inn called the Winchfield Inn and a combination of old residential properties and new ones.

In the 2011 census Winchfield parish had a population of 664. The population is scattered across this wide parish, which includes Potbridge, settlement around Winchfield church, Winchfield Hurst and Shapley Heath.

== History ==
There was a Stone Age settlement at Bagwell Green, a few hundred yards past the church in the direction of Odiham Common. Winchfield also has a few examples of 16th and 17th century buildings, particularly near the church.

Winchfield's manor was mentioned in the Domesday Book of 1088. In 1838, a station was constructed, known as Shapley Heath and was renamed Winchfield Station, probably in 1840. Between 1838 and 1839, Shapley Heath station served as the terminus point for all rail services from London. From here, all mail was then distributed to the rest of the South of England by mail coach. This continued for about a year, when the railway was extended to Basingstoke late in 1839.

A large workhouse was located in Pale Lane which became a hospital and has since been redeveloped for housing.

The parish council was formed in 1894, and since then the village has continued to slowly expand, with newer properties constructed at Winchfield Hurst and near the Station.

== Notable buildings ==
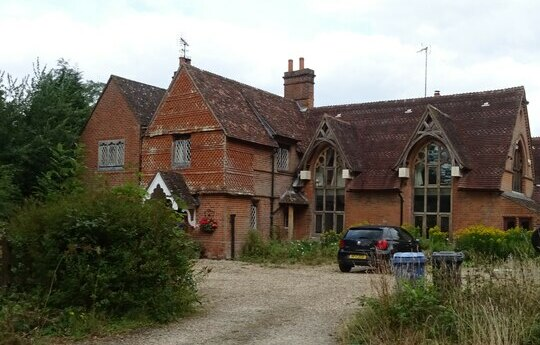
The Old School House

=== St Mary the Virgin ===
St Mary the Virgin was built during the 12th century. The church has been hardly altered since its original construction in the 12th century, with the exception of the sixteenth century south porch and a modern north aisle and top stage of the tower.

=== The Old School House ===
The Old School was built in 1860–61 by William Burges. The building is of brick, in the gothic style, with a patterned tiled roof. Its most striking feature is the pair of "full height windows with open timberwork gables marking the former schoolroom." Following alteration, the school is now a private residence.

== Winchfield Festival ==
Winchfield holds a biennial festival, which is centred on Winchfield's 12th century church. The festival developed from a single musical event in 1990 to raise funds to renovate the church organ. Since then the festival has expanded with the help of the local community to include both fun and educational events. The Winchfield Festival is a properly constituted charity, with educational as well as entertainment goals.

The festivals cover many musical genres, including classical, jazz, global and pop.

== Proposed new development at Winchfield ==
On 27 November 2014, Hart District Council voted to test Winchfield as a suitable location for a new settlement of up to 10,000 homes. However in November 2021 the council's cabinet agreed to abandon the development project when government funding failed to meet expected requirements, with a July 2022 council report noting deficiencies in the way the project had been run.

== Notable people ==
- Arthur Wood (1875–1961), Royal Navy rear admiral and first-class cricketer
