= James Woodrow =

James Woodrow may refer to:

- James Woodrow (professor) (1828–1907), professor at Columbia Theological Seminary, and president of the College of South Carolina
- James Woodrow (musician) (born 1961), English guitarist
