= Wood Township =

Wood Township may refer to the following townships in the United States:

- Wood Township, Clark County, Indiana
- Wood Township, Wright County, Missouri
- Wood Township, Huntingdon County, Pennsylvania

== See also ==
- Woods Township, Chippewa County, Minnesota
- Big Woods Township, Marshall County, Minnesota
