= Woody (name) =

Woody, also spelled Woodie, is a masculine given name in its own right or a pet form of Woodrow and other names such as Elwood or Heywood. It was especially popular in the US during and after the presidency of Woodrow Wilson. It is also a surname.

Woody may refer to:

== Given name or nickname ==
=== People ===
- Woody Abernathy (outfielder) (1908–1961), American baseball player
- Woody Abernathy (pitcher) (1915–1994), American baseball player
- Woody Allen (born 1935), American screenwriter and actor
- Woody Austin (born 1964), American golfer
- Woody Bennett (born 1956), American football player
- Woody Blackburn (born 1951), American golfer
- Woody Bledsoe (1921–1995), American mathematician and computer scientist
- Woody Bowman (1941–2015), American politician
- Woody Bredell (1884–1976), British cinematographer and actor
- Woody Brown (actor) (born 1956), American actor
- Woody Brown (surfer) (1912–2008), American surfer and designer
- Woody Campbell (American football) (born 1944), American football player
- Woody Campbell (basketball) (1925–2004), Canadian basketball player
- Woody Crowson (1918–1947), American baseball player
- Woody Crumbo (1912–1989), Native American artist
- Woody Cunningham, American vocalist and drummer and member of Kleeer
- Woodrow Dantzler (born 1979), American football player
- Woody Davis (1913–1999), American baseball player
- Woody Deck (born 1983), American poker player
- Woody De Othello (born 1991), American ceramist, painter
- Woodie Dixon, General Counsel and Vice President of Business Affairs for the Pacific-10 Conference
- Woody Dumart (1916–2001), Canadian ice hockey player
- Woody Durham (1941–2018), American sports commentator
- Woody English (1906–1997), American baseball player
- Woody Erdman (1926–1997), American sportscaster and television producer
- Woody Evans (born 1977), American librarian and author
- Woody Fair (1914–2000), American baseball player
- Woodie Flowers (1943–2019), emeritus professor of mechanical engineering
- Woody Freeman (born 1946), American businessman and politician
- Woodie Fryman (1940–2011), Major League Baseball pitcher
- Woody Gelman (1915–1978), American cartoonist and publisher
- Woody Green (born 1951), American football player
- Woody Grimshaw (1919–1974), American basketball player and coach
- Woody Guthrie (1912–1967), American singer-songwriter and folk musician
- Woody Gwyn (born 1944), American artist
- Woody Harrelson (born 1961), American actor
- Woody Harris (1911–1985), American songwriter
- Woody Hayes (1913–1987), American football player and coach
- Woodie Held (1932–2009), Major League Baseball player
- Woody Herman (1913–1987), American jazz clarinetist
- Woody Holton, American historian
- Woody Huyke (born 1937), American baseball player and manager
- Woody Jackson, American musician
- Woody Jenkins (born 1947), American newspaper editor and politician
- Woody Jensen (1907–2001), American baseball player
- Woody Johnson (born 1947), American businessman and philanthropist
- Woody Jun, Korean business academic
- Woody Keeble (1917–1982), Native American U.S. Army veteran
- Woodie King Jr. (1937–2026), African-American director and producer of stage and screen
- Woody Kling (1925–1988), American television writer and producer
- Woody Lawrence, Dominican Olympic swimmer
- Woody Lee (born 1968), American singer-songwriter and country musician
- Woody Lowe (born 1954), American football player
- Woody Main (1922–1992), American baseball player
- Woody Mann, American guitarist and jazz musician
- Woody Milintachinda (born 1976), Thai radio and TV presenter
- Woody Myers (born 1954), American physician and politician
- Woody Paul (born 1949), American singer and fiddler
- Woody Paige (born 1946), American sports journalist
- Woody Peoples (1943–2010), American football player
- Woody Pirtle, American artist
- Woody Rich (1916–1983), American baseball player
- Woody Rock (born 1976), American R&B and gospel singer and member of Dru Hill
- Woodie Salmon (born 1952), American politician
- Woody Sauldsberry (1935–2007), American basketball player
- Woody Sedlacek (1919–2004), American racehorse trainer
- Woody Shaw (1944–1989), American trumpeter and jazz musician
- Woody Smith (1927–2005), American baseball player and manager
- Woody Spring (born 1944), United States Army colonel and astronaut
- Woody Stephens (1913–1998), American racehorse trainer
- Woody Strode (1914–1994), American sportsman and actor
- Woody Sullivan (born 1944), American physicist and astronomer
- Woody Upchurch (1911–1971), American baseball player
- Woody van Amen (born 1936), Dutch visual artist
- W. S. Van Dyke (1889–1943), American film director
- Woody Vasulka (1937–2019), Czech-American video artist
- Woody Wagenhorst (1863–1946), American football and baseball player and coach
- Woody Weatherman (born 1965), American guitarist and member of Corrosion of Conformity
- Woody Wheaton (1914–1995), American baseball player
- Woodie W. White (born 1935), United Methodist Church bishop
- Woody Widenhofer (born 1943), American football coach
- Woody Williams (born 1966), American baseball player
- Woody Williams (infielder) (1912–1995), American baseball player
- Woody Williams (pitcher, born 1918) (1918–1990), American Negro league baseball pitcher
- Woody Wilson, American bass guitar player and member of Alive N Kickin'
- Woody Woodard (c. 1917–1996), American football coach
- Woody Woodbury (born 1924), American comedian and actor
- Woody Woodmansey (born 1950), British drummer known for his work with David Bowie
- Woody Woodward (born 1942), American baseball player and general manager

=== Fictional characters ===
- Woody Woodpecker, in short cartoons by the Walter Lantz animation studio and Universal Pictures
- Sheriff Woody, protagonist of the Toy Story franchise
- Woody, anthropomorphic chunk of balsa wood from the animated web series Battle for Dream Island.
- Woodrow Wilson 'Woody' Hoyt, a police detective in the TV series Crossing Jordan
- Woody Boyd, in the TV series Cheers
- Woody Fink, in the TV show The Suite Life on Deck
- Woody Goodman, in the TV series Veronica Mars
- Larry "Woody" Woodhouse, in the Australian soap opera Neighbours
- Lazarus Long, science-fiction character born Woodrow Wilson Smith and called "Woody" by his own family

== Surname ==
- Alanah Woody (1956–2007), American archaeologist and anthropologist
- Allen Woody (1955–2000), American bass guitarist and member of The Allman Brothers Band and Gov't Mule
- Arthur Woody (1884–1946), American forest ranger
- Damien Woody (born 1977), American football player
- Elizabeth Woody (born 1959), Native American artist
- Frank H. Woody (1833–1912), American politician and judge
- Joey Woody (born 1973), American track and field athlete
- Larry Woody, American sports writer
- Russ Woody, American author and television producer
