= Woody Bay =

Woody Bay may refer to:

- Woody Bay, Devon, England
- Woody Bay, Isle of Wight, England
- Woody Bay, Newfoundland and Labrador, Canada
- Woody Bay railway station, Devon, England
