= Woodrow Wilson (disambiguation) =

Woodrow Wilson (1856–1924) was the 28th president of the United States from 1913 to 1921.

Woodrow Wilson may also refer to:

- Woodrow Wilson "Woody" Guthrie (1912–1967), American folk singer
- Woodrow Wilson (Nevada politician) (1915–1999), Member of the Nevada Assembly from the 4th district
- Woodrow Wilson (baseball) (1916–1965), American Negro leagues baseball player
- John Woodrow Wilson (1922–2015), American artist
- Woodie Wilson (1925–1994), American stock car racing driver
- Robert Woodrow Wilson (born 1936), American astronomer

== See also ==
- SS President Wilson
- Woodrow Wilson High School (disambiguation)
- Woody Wilson (disambiguation)
