= Jun Yong-wook =

Yong Wook Jun (Korean: 전용욱), also known as Woody Jun, is a Korean international business academic who is the dean of the SolBridge International School of Business.

== Early life ==
Jun received a bachelor's degree in business administration at Seoul National University, a master's degree in management at Northwestern University's Kellogg Graduate School of Management, and a Ph.D. in management at the MIT Sloan School of Management, where he focused on international business studies.

== Career ==
Jun has served as a consultant to major international corporations, including acting as a director of Hyundai Electronics and Hynix Semiconductor, and was a professor of business administration and dean of the Graduate School of Business at Chung-Ang University in Seoul until 2010. In March 2010, Jun became President of the Korean Academic Society of Business Administration (KASBA). Jun also serves as executive director of the Asia Institute.
