= Allan Woodrow (author) =

American writer

- Born: November 6, 1964 (age 61)
- Education: University of Michigan
- Occupation: Writer
- Writing career
- Genres: Children's Literature, Middle Grade
- Website: allanwoodrow.com

Allan Woodrow (born November 6, 1964) is an American author of children's literature, mostly middle grade fiction. His books include The Curse of the Werepenguin, Class Dismissed and The Pet War. His first book, the Rotten Adventures of Zachary Ruthless, debuted in 2011 and was published by HarperCollins Children's Books.

== Biography ==
Woodrow has written more than thirty books for children. He was born in Baltimore, Maryland and was raised in Okemos, Michigan, a suburb of East Lansing. Allan attended the University of Michigan in Ann Arbor, Michigan, and then became an advertising copywriter in Detroit, Michigan. He later continued his advertising career in St. Louis and Chicago, where he met and married the former Lauren Cohn. They currently reside outside Chicago and have two children.

Woodrow began writing children's literature in 2009, and by the end of the year had sold his first book, the Rotten Adventures of Zachary Ruthless, a graphic novel illustrated by Aaron Blecha. Allan wrote The Curse of the Werepenguin trilogy (Viking, 2019-2021), and The Liberty Falls Elementary School series which includes Field Tripped (Scholastic, 2018), Unschooled (Scholastic, 2017), and Class Dismissed (Scholastic, 2015). He is also the author of The Pet War (Scholastic, 2013) and contributed to the collection Lucky Dog: Twelve Tales of Rescued Dogs (Scholastic, 2014). Also, under the pen name Fowler DeWitt, he is the author of The Contagious Colors of Mumpley Middle School (Simon & Schuster, 2013) among other books. Woodrow took the pen name from two towns near where he grew up, Fowler, Michigan and DeWitt, Michigan. A sequel to Mumpley Middle School, The Amazing Wilmer Dooley (Simon & Schuster, 2014)was released in August 2014.

== Works ==
The Battle of the Werepenguin (Viking, August 17, 2021)
The Revenge of the Werepenguin (Viking, August 4, 2020)
The Curse of the Werepenguin (Viking, August 13, 2019)
Field Tripped (Scholastic Press, August 28, 2018)
Unschooled (Scholastic Press, August 27, 2017)
Class Dismissed (Scholastic Press, October 27, 2015)
The Pet War (Scholastic Press, October 29, 2013)
The Rotten Adventures of Zachary Ruthless (HarperCollins, April 26, 2011)
The Contagious Colors of Mumpley Middle School (Atheneum Books for Young Readers, September 3, 2013); Written as Fowler DeWitt
The Amazing Wilmer Dooley (Atheneum Books for Young Readers, August 26, 2014); Written as Fowler DeWitt
Lucky Dog: Twelve Tales of Rescued Dogs (Scholastic, January 28, 2014)

== Reception ==
Of The Curse of the Werepenguin, Kirkus Reviews writes, "This series opener’s overall outrageous sense of humor has a high appeal. As irreverent, sarcastic, and strange as murderous, barking penguins.”

Of Unschooled, Kirkus Reviews writes, "An amusing road map to bad behavior but also a fairly subtle reminder of the culpability of mere bystanders to nastiness.

Of Class Dismissed, Kirkus Reviews writes, "Aimed equally at boys and girls, this engaging comedy offers some life lessons with a giggle.

Of The Pet War, Bulletin of the Center for Children's Books writes, "This fast-paced and funny novel presents a protagonist in the tradition of Tom Sawyer, a smug but winning preteen boy generally beloved by his peers though regarded with suspicion and perhaps a hint of distaste by adults. The relatable and redemptive Otto and his misadventures will fare especially well with those looking for a character with a smart mouth and big heart."

Of The Rotten Adventures of Zachary Ruthless, Publishers Weekly writes, "If it's true that everyone loves a bad boy, Zachary should attract a sizable fan base," adding that "Blecha's high-energy cartoons add extra absurdity to this pun-studded slice of frivolity, which is likely to snare reluctant readers with a fondness for slapstick."

== External References ==
- Author Site
- Simon & Schuster Fowler DeWitt Bio
- Amazon author Page
- Scholastic author Page
