= Woods Estate =

Woods Estate may refer to:

- Woods Estate, London (Redbridge)
- Woods Estate, West Midlands (Wednesbury)
