= Wood River =

Wood River may refer to:

== Rivers ==
=== In Canada ===
- Wood River (British Columbia), a tributary of the Columbia River via Kinbasket Lake
- Wood River (Saskatchewan), a river in south-west Saskatchewan

=== In Ireland ===
- Wood River (County Clare), Kilrush

=== In the United States ===
- Wood River (Nushagak River tributary) (Alaska)
- Wood River (Illinois), a tributary of the Mississippi
- Wood River (Oregon)
- Wood River (Pawcatuck River), Connecticut & Rhode Island
- Wood River (Nebraska)
- Wood River (Wisconsin), a tributary of the St. Croix River
- Wood River (Greybull River), a tributary of the Greybull River, Wyoming
- Big Wood River, Idaho
- Little Wood River (Idaho)
- Wood River Valley, Idaho
- Wood River or Wood's River for Abraham Wood, a colonial financier; now the New River (Kanawha River) in West Virginia, Virginia, and North Carolina

== Places ==
=== In Canada ===
- Wood River (electoral district), in Saskatchewan
- Wood River No. 74, Saskatchewan, a rural municipality

=== In the United States ===
- Wood River, Alaska
- Wood River, Illinois
- Wood River, Nebraska
- Wood River, Wisconsin

== See also ==
- Wood River Township (disambiguation)
