= Allan Lee Woodrow =

Canadian politician

The Honourable Allan Lee Woodrow

Canadian Senator from Ontario
- In office May 19, 1953 – March 15, 1966
- Appointed by: Louis St. Laurent

Personal details
- Born: 16 April 1886 Saint John, New Brunswick, Canada
- Died: March 29, 1966 (aged 79)
- Party: Liberal
- Occupation: Bank manager

Allan Lee Woodrow (16 April 1886 – 29 March 1966) was a Canadian politician.

== Background ==
Born in Saint John, New Brunswick, he was appointed to the Canadian Senate on 19 May 1953 on the recommendation of Louis St-Laurent. A Liberal, he represented the senatorial division of Toronto Centre for the province of Ontario until his resignation on 15 March 1966.
