= Justice Wood =

Justice Wood may refer to:

- Carroll D. Wood (1858–1941), associate justice of the Arkansas Supreme Court
- Georgina Theodora Wood (born 1947), chief justice of Supreme Court of Ghana
- James Roland Wood (born 1941), judge of the Supreme Court of New South Wales
- Reuben Wood (1792/1793–1864), associate justice of the Ohio Supreme Court
- Rhonda K. Wood (born 1969), associate justice of the Arkansas Supreme Court
- William Wood, 1st Baron Hatherley (1801–1881), Lord Chancellor of Britain

== See also ==
- Judge Wood (disambiguation)
- Justice Woods (disambiguation)
  - William Burnham Woods (1824–1887), associate justice of the United States Supreme Court
