= Julian Woodrow =

American singer and songwriter (born 1996)

- Born: December 30, 1996 (age 29); Sunderland, Vermont
- Occupations: Singer, Songwriter
- Instrument: Vocals
- Years active: 2011–present
- Website: www.take2official.com

Julian Kestrel Woodrow (born December 30, 1996) is an American singer and songwriter. He is half of the duo "Take 2" (formerly known as "Blackberry Jam"), along with his brother Adrian Chirtea.

== Biography ==
Woodrow is son of Heather Chirtea and Gordon Woodrow. He has a twin brother, Adrian Chirtea. Although twins have a different last name because since Adrian was younger he always went by his mother's last name and Julian by his father's.

== Career ==
Julian and his brother have been singing together since they were little and enjoy harmonizing with each other today. They formed a group, consisting of the two called Blackberry Jam. Under this name, they auditioned for the X-Factor in the fall of 2011 making a video of them singing the song, Hallelujah and that got them into X Factor's Boot Camp but were eliminated during the competition.

In 2012 they play small shows in their hometown Vermont and post new covers on YouTube. They tried out for X-Factor again and their audition tape was their Payphone video (That can be found on their YouTube channel) which got them through the first 3 rounds. They also tried out for America's Got Talent and The Voice.

In 2013 they won a scholarship to the 2013 Prodigy Camp Project, a summer program that brings together 20 of the most promising teenage songwriters and filmmakers to hone their craft.
