= Justice Woods =

Justice Woods may refer to:

== United States Supreme Court ==
- William Burnham Woods (1824–1887), associate justice of the United States Supreme Court

== Other United States courts ==
- Andrew Salter Woods (1803–1863), associate justice of the New Hampshire Supreme Court
- Charles Albert Woods (1852–1925), justice of the Supreme Court of South Carolina
- Henry Woods (judge) (1918–2002), special associate justice of the Arkansas Supreme Court
- Homer B. Woods (1869–1941), associate justice of the Supreme Court of Appeals of West Virginia
- Samuel Woods (West Virginia politician) (1822–1897), associate justice of the Supreme Court of Appeals of West Virginia
- Thomas H. Woods (1836–1910), chief justice of the Supreme Court of Mississippi
- William Allen Woods (1837–1901), associate justice of the Supreme Court of Indiana

== See also ==
- Judge Woods (disambiguation)
- Justice Wood (disambiguation)
