= Woody Point =

Woody Point may refer to:

- Woody Point, Newfoundland and Labrador, Canada
- Woody Point, Queensland, Australia
- Woody Point, Isle of Wight, United Kingdom
