= Woody Island =

Woody Island may refer to:

== Asia ==
- Woody Island, South China Sea

== Australia ==
- Mid Woody Islet, Tasmania, Australia
- Woody Island (Queensland), Australia
- Big Woody Island, Queensland, Australia
- Woody Islands (Big Woody Island and Little Woody Island, Queensland, Australia)
- Woody Island (Tasmania), Australia
- Woody Island (Western Australia)
- Woody Island, alternate name for Anderson Island (Tasmania), Australia

== North America ==
- Woody Island, Newfoundland and Labrador, near Garden Cove, Newfoundland and Labrador, Canada
- Woody Island (Alaska), near Kodiak, Alaska, USA
- Woody Island (Montana), in Lake Bowdoin, Montana
