= Arthur Wood (Royal Navy officer) =

English cricketer and Royal Navy officer

Rear-Admiral Arthur Wood CMG
- Born: 23 February 1875; Winchfield, Hampshire, England
- Died: 30 January 1961 (aged 85); Ryton, County Durham, England
- Military career
- Allegiance: United Kingdom
- Branch: Royal Navy
- Service years: 1896–1926
- Rank: Rear-Admiral
- Commands: HMS Apollo (1917–1919)
- Conflicts: First World War
- Awards: Order of St Michael and St George

Rear-Admiral Arthur Edmund Wood CMG (23 February 1875 – 30 January 1961) was an English first-class cricketer and Royal Navy officer.

== Life ==
He was born in February 1875 at Winchfield, Hampshire, the son of Arthur Hardy Wood of Duddleswell Manor, Sussex. His mother was Annis Matilda Hardy, daughter of Charles Hardy of Chilham Castle, Kent.

Wood attended the Britannia Royal Naval College, graduating into the Royal Navy as a sub-lieutenant. He was promoted to lieutenant in December 1896, and was posted as 1st lieutenant aboard HMS Britannia on 10 January 1903. Promotion to commander followed in December 1907. Wood made a single appearance in first-class cricket for the Royal Navy Cricket Club against the British Army cricket team at Lord's in 1912. He captained the Royal Navy during the match, scoring 16 runs and failing to take a wicket. He served in the First World War, during which he was promoted to captain in December 1915 and served in the latter stages of the war as captain of HMS Apollo. Wood was made a Companion of the Order of St Michael and St George in the 1919 New Year Honours. He was placed on the retired list at his own request in June 1922, with promotion to rear admiral coming while on the retired list in August 1926.

He was deemed unfit for service during the Second World War and later died in his mid-eighties in January 1961 at Ryton, County Durham.

== Family ==
Wood married in 1924 Ruth Avril Johnston (died 1957).
