= William Maxwell Wood =

American surgeon and US Navy officer (1809–1880)

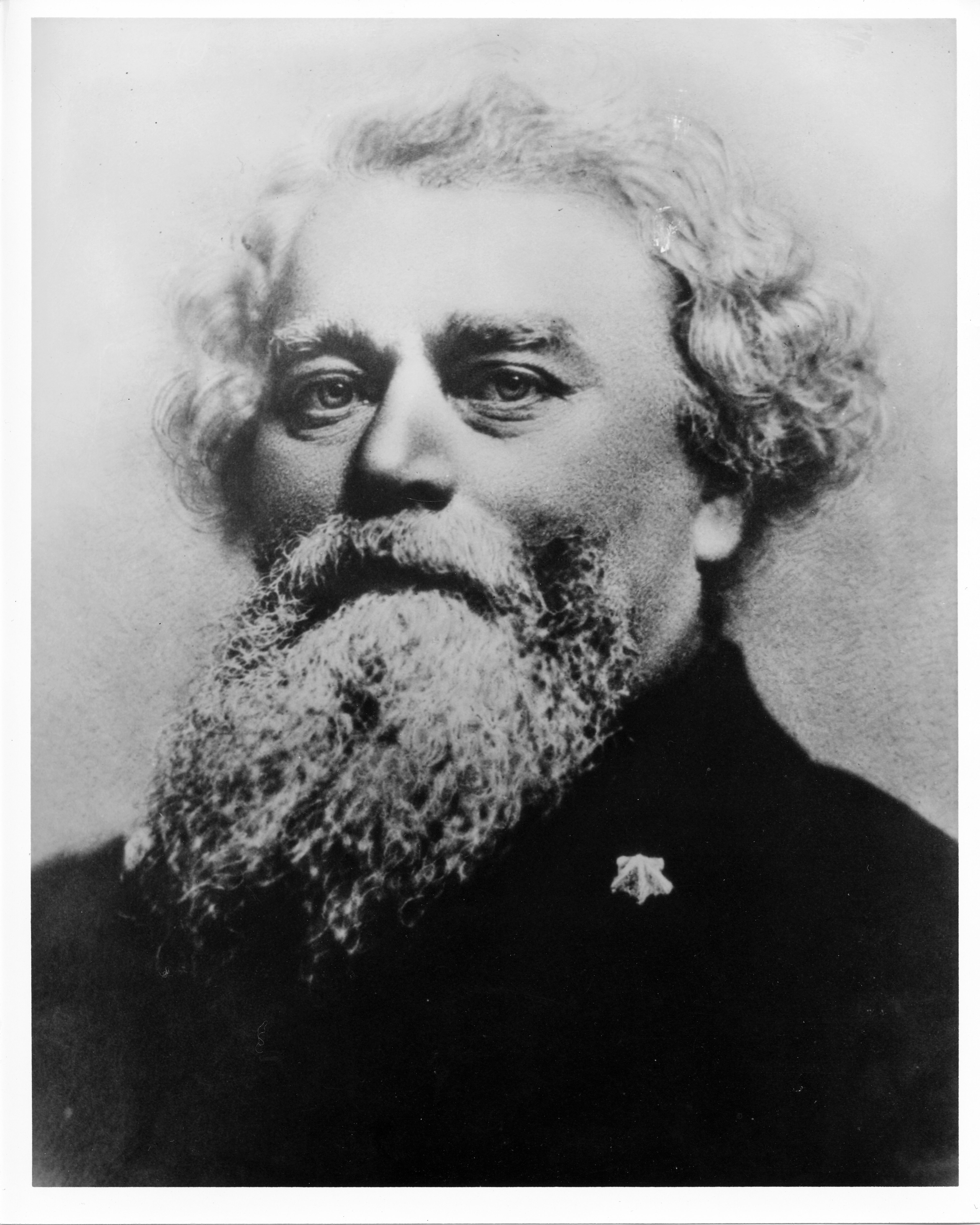
- Born: May 27, 1809; Baltimore, Maryland
- Died: March 1, 1880 (aged 70); Owings Mills, Maryland
- Military career
- Allegiance: United States of America
- Branch: United States Navy
- Service years: 1829–1871
- Rank: Surgeon General of the United States Navy
- Conflicts: Seminole Wars; Mexican–American War; Second Opium War; *Attack on Chinese Barrier Forts; American Civil War; *Battle of Hampton Roads; *Seizure of Sewall's Point

William Maxwell Wood (May 27, 1809 – March 1, 1880) was an officer and surgeon in the United States Navy in the middle 19th century. He became the First Surgeon General of the U.S. Navy in 1871, with the equivalent rank of commodore. He rose to president of the examining board in 1868 and chief of the U.S. Navy Bureau of Medicine and Surgery in 1870 following his service in the American Civil War as Fleet Surgeon of the North Atlantic Blockading Squadron aboard the USS Minnesota and Medical Officer of the James River Flotilla, participating in several famous Naval battles, and establishing temporary hospitals as needed during the Civil War.

As BUMED Chief, Wood was instrumental in increasing the stature of the naval surgeon, championing a bill eventually passed by Congress increasing the rank and compensation of physicians in the Navy, enabling the Navy to attract and recruit more qualified physicians. (The Appropriations Bill of 3 March 1871 created the titles of "Surgeon General of the Navy" and "Medical Director" and "established" a formal corps of Medical Officers. Ever since, the Navy Medical Corps has celebrated this day as its anniversary.) During Wood's tenure at the top of BUMED the Naval Hospital at Mare Island, California was completed and opened. Earlier in his career Wood was the personal consulting physician of President Zachary Taylor.

Wood is most remembered in U.S. Naval history for his daring journey through Mexico in 1846 at the onset of the Mexican–American War, where he eluded detection and capture as a U.S. spy in enemy territory and successfully provided vital intelligence leading to the possession of California by the Pacific Squadron, as well as providing intelligence information to the Secretary of the Navy in Washington regarding Mexican fortifications and military operations.

Wood authored three books chronicling his voyages and missions with the Pacific and East India Squadrons, and his ideas and recommendations on reforming the U.S. Navy, as well as many literary articles for publications of his day.

== Early life and career ==
Born in Baltimore, Maryland, Wood graduated from the Medical School at the University of Maryland, was appointed Assistant Surgeon on May 16, 1829, and, between 1830 and 1834, served with the West Indies and Home Squadrons, as well as with the Army during the Seminole Wars.

For several years he conducted a medical practice in Terre Haute, Indiana, where he and his family followed his mother and siblings in relocating from Baltimore after the completion of the National Road in 1834. He resumed sea duty as Passed Assistant Surgeon aboard the ship-of-the-line USS Independence in 1836, sailing to St. Petersburg, Russia, where Czar Nicholas boarded and inspected, before the Independence sailed to the South Atlantic. His wife Hannah died while he was serving on the Independence and he returned to Terre Haute to tend to his young daughters Hannah and Elizabeth and the family property in the middle of 1838.

During 1839 he served with the West Indies Squadron and the receiving ship in Baltimore, before being assigned to the Pacific Squadron in 1843. He became Fleet Surgeon with the Pacific Squadron in 1844 and, upon completion of his tour in 1846, was about to return to the United States when relations between that country and Mexico became decidedly strained. The commander of the Navy's Pacific Squadron, Commodore John D. Sloat, consequently entrusted certain dispatches to Wood to carry back to the United States with him. Wood volunteered to travel through Mexico and report upon conditions there. Accompanied by the American consul from Mazatlán, Mexico, the former fleet surgeon commenced his journey across Mexico.

=== Mexican–American War ===
Arriving at Guadalajara on May 10, Wood and his companion found the town "in a high state of agitation" owing to the reception there of the news of the battles between American and Mexican forces at Palo Alto and Resaca de la Palma, on the Rio Grande. The surgeon immediately wrote a dispatch to Sloat at Mazatlán, and it was delivered in five days – an exceptional occurrence in those days. His message that hostilities with Mexico had actually commenced was the first tidings of that nature that Sloat had received.

Wood meanwhile continued on his journey across Mexico and subsequently arrived at Mexico City to be "startled and shocked by hearing newsboys crying through the streets 'Grand victory over the North Americans.'" He later learned through a trusted friend of the Mexican minister of war that General Zachary Taylor's men had, in fact, annihilated the Mexican Army's choice regiment. Surgeon Wood remained in Mexico City not less than a week and gathered more information which he sent off to Commodore Sloat, apprising him of the situation, via Guadalajara.

Wood continued his mission, as he had since the beginning of it, in civilian clothes—running the risk of being apprehended as a spy—and, while posing as an Englishman, inspected the defenses of the castle at Chapultepec. Continuing on to Veracruz, the surgeon carefully took notes on Mexico, its condition and resources. Ultimately, the physician reached a neutral man-of-war and was taken to the flagship of the American blockading squadron. Sailing on a vessel especially detached for the purpose, Wood carried the vital intelligence information to Washington, D.C.

Meanwhile, Commodore Sloat took action. As he later recorded in a letter to Wood, "The information you furnished me at Mazatlan from the City of Mexico, via Guadalajara, (at the risk of your life) was the only reliable information I received of that event, and which induced me to proceed immediately to California, and upon my own responsibility to take possession of that country, which I did on 7 July 1846."

=== 1848–1861 ===
Following the Mexican–American War, Wood served in the receiving ship at Baltimore and later went to the steamer Michigan, the first US Navy iron-hulled warship, operating on the Great Lakes, and homeported in Erie, Pennsylvania. During this period, he sold his property in Terre Haute, and married a niece of President Zachary Taylor, Rose Mary Carson, daughter of Pennsylvania Senate leader Thomas Carson, and made his home with his family in Erie Pennsylvania until the end of the Civil War. Wood and Rose had six sons and a daughter, including William Maxwell Jr, Charles Erskine Scott, Thomas Carson, Peter Bryson, James McIntosh, David Abbott, and Roberta Morgan. While in Erie, Wood treated President Zachary Taylor during a visit to Erie, and became Taylor's personal consulting physician. From 1853 to 1855 Wood served at the Naval Hospital at Sackett's Harbor, New York. He again served as Fleet Surgeon—this time with the East India Squadron—from 1856 to 1858, serving under Commodore James Armstrong aboard the USS San Jacinto, and took part in the negotiations with the King of Siam in opening that country to American trade, in establishing the first American consulate to Japan, and in Commander Andrew H. Foote's attack upon the Chinese Barrier Forts—of "enormous strength ... built of large blocks of granite ... heavily armed."—at Canton, China, in response to Chinese attacks upon American shipping during the Second Opium War.

=== American Civil War ===
Wood subsequently served a second tour in Michigan before he became Fleet Surgeon for the Western Gulf Blockading Squadron aboard the USS Hartford, and the North Atlantic Blockading Squadron during the American Civil War. While serving aboard the flagship USS Minnesota, Wood participated in the Battle of Hampton Roads, and witnessed the historic battle of the ironclads USS Monitor and CSS Virginia (the former USS Merrimack) in Hampton Roads; and later took part in the assault and capture of Sewall's Point, and the capture of the Hatterras Forts. Wood established a Naval Hospital at Sewell's Point, and later served as medical inspector of the James River Flotilla, before being transferred back to the Michigan before the end of the U.S. Civil War.

=== First Surgeon General of US Navy ===
After the Civil War, Wood purchased a farm in Owings Mills, Maryland, named Rosewood Glen, where he and his family would live during the pinnacle of his Naval career, and through retirement until his death in 1880.

After his last duty on the USS Michigan in Erie, Wood served on various Naval medical examining boards in Boston and New York and at Baltimore and Annapolis in 1866 and 1867 and was President of the Naval Examining Board in 1868.

He became Chief of the Bureau of Medicine and Surgery in 1870. During his tenure in that role, the Naval Hospital at Mare Island, California was completed and opened. He was appointed the first Surgeon General of the United States Navy and Medical Director on March 3, 1871, with equivalent rank of Commodore, concurrent with Congressional Passage of The Appropriations Bill of 3 March 1871, which created the Navy Medical Corps of Officers.

Wood was retired for age later in 1871 but continued to serve the Navy in a civilian capacity as medical inspector – general hospitals and fleets until his final retirement in 1873.

=== Writings ===
Wood was a writer of books and essays, focusing on his travels, life at sea in the US Navy, various Naval battles and Naval missions, and his political beliefs and ideas for improving the US Navy. His books include Wandering Sketches of People and Things in South America, Polynesia, California, and Other Places Visited During a Cruise Aboard the U.S. Ships Levant, Portsmouth, and Savannah, A Shoulder to the Wheel of Progress, and Fankwei: or The San Jacinto in the Seas of India, China, and Japan.

=== Retirement ===
After retirement Wood managed his farm, Rosewood Glen, in Owings Mills, Maryland, with his wife Rose and his children. He became president of the Garrison Woods Farmers Association, and was a member of St. Thomas Episcopal Church.

=== Death ===
Wood died at his farm, Rosewood Glen, in Owings Mills, Maryland, March 1, 1880. He is buried at the family plot in the St. Thomas Church Cemetery, along with his wife Rose Carson Wood, a daughter Hannah, and his son Peter Bryson.

== Honors ==
Wood was commended by Commodore Sloat, Secretary Bankcroft, and Senator Mallory, Chairman of the Committee on Naval Affairs in the Senate of the United States for his successful mission behind enemy lines in Mexico in 1846 and his communication to Commodore Sloat which enabled the US Navy to acquire California at the onset of the War with Mexico. He was posthumously honored in 1901 by The Society of California Pioneers, with his inclusion in the volume Portraits of Members of the Society of California Pioneers.

Wood's name is inscribed in one of the base stones of The Sloat Monument erected at the Presidio in Monterey, California in commemoration of the US Navy's Pacific Fleet taking possession of California in 1846.

Four U.S. Navy ships, have been named for Wood; but only two of them were completed and commissioned. The first named for him was the Clemson-class destroyer USS Wood (DD-317), built in California and commissioned at Mare Island. She was in commission from 1919 to 1930.

During World War II, two ships were named William M. Wood in his honor but were cancelled before they were built. The first, the Rudderow-class destroyer escort USS William M. Wood (DE-287), was cancelled in March 1944, as was the second, the John C. Butler-class destroyer escort USS William M. Wood (DE-557), in June 1944.

The Gearing-class destroyer USS William M. Wood (DD-715), was built in Newark, New Jersey, and was commissioned at the Brooklyn Navy Yard. She was in commission from 1945 to 1976. After serving in the Pacific on post-war Western Pacific patrols, she was transferred to the Atlantic Fleet in 1949 as the Cold War escalated. She was converted to a radar picket destroyer (DDR-715) in 1953, and was converted and modernized in 1964 to an all purpose destroyer with advanced sonar and submarine warfare weaponry. She patrolled the Atlantic, Caribbean, and Mediterranean during the Cold War years, alternating operations between the Second Fleet homeported in Newport, Rhode Island, and Norfolk, Virginia, making 18 deployments with the Sixth Fleet including an extended deployment from 1972 to 1975 where she was homeported near Athens, Greece.

Her missions included aiding earthquake victims in Volos Greece in 1955; supporting Eastern Mediterranean US coastal operations during the 1956 War between Israel and Egypt, and during the Lebanese crisis in 1958; participation in the Cuban Quarantine-Blockade in 1962; the pursuit of the hijacked Venezuelan freighter SS Anzoategui in 1963; coastal operations off the Dominican Republic and evacuation of American citizens during that county's revolution in 1965; participation in the search for the USS Scorpion in 1968; shadowing the Soviet Mediterranean Fleet during 1970–71, including intelligence gathering on the new Moskva class Soviet Helo-Guided Missile Cruiser-Carriers, and special operations in the Black Sea; coastal support operations off Crete during the Turkish invasion of Cyprus in 1974; additional Black Sea operations during her extended 1972–1975 deployment; and continuous escort and defense operations with US carrier task forces in the Atlantic, Caribbean, and Mediterranean.

=== USS William M Wood Association ===
The USS William M Wood Association was formed in 1994 and currently has an active living shipmate directory of over 1,600 former crew of USS William M. Wood (DD-715). Eighteen annual reunions have been held by the association, and many of the active living shipmates regularly attend. The 19th reunion was to be held in Myrtle Beach, South Carolina, October 14–18, 2015. The association has initiated a project named "Wood III" with the goal of requesting the U.S. Navy to continue the legacy of Wood and the U.S. Navy ship lineage for ships named in his honor, by naming another new Navy destroyer after Wood, thus enabling the shipmates of the William M. Wood, including those who served during World War II, the Korean War, the Vietnam War, and the Cold War, to continue to honor Wood.
