= USS William M. Wood (DE-557) =

History

United States
- Name: USS William M. Wood
- Namesake: William Maxwell Wood (1819-1880), a U.S. Navy officer and surgeon, first Surgeon General of the United States Navy and first Medical Director of the U.S. Navy
- Builder: Boston Navy Yard, Boston, Massachusetts (proposed)
- Laid down: Never
- Fate: Construction contract cancelled 10 June 1944

General characteristics
- Class & type: John C. Butler-class destroyer escort
- Displacement: 1,350 tons
- Length: 306 ft (93 m)
- Beam: 36 ft 8 in (11 m)
- Draft: 9 ft 5 in (3 m)
- Propulsion: 2 boilers, 2 geared turbine engines, 12,000 shp; 2 propellers
- Speed: 24 knots (44 km/h)
- Range: 6,000 nmi. (12,000 km) @ 12 kt
- Complement: 14 officers, 201 enlisted
- Armament: 2 × single 5 in (127 mm) guns; 2 × twin 40 mm (1.6 in) AA guns; 10 × single 20 mm (0.79 in) AA guns; 1 × triple 21 in (533 mm) torpedo tubes; 8 × depth charge throwers; 1 × Hedgehog ASW mortar; 2 × depth charge racks

USS William M. Wood (DE-557) was a proposed World War II United States Navy John C. Butler-class destroyer escort that was never built.

William M. Wood was to have been built at the Boston Navy Yard in Boston, Massachusetts. Her construction contract was cancelled on 10 June 1944.

The name William M. Wood was reassigned to the destroyer USS William M. Wood (DD-715).
