= Woodrow, Pocahontas County, West Virginia =

Woodrow, West Virginia
- Unincorporated community
- Location within West Virginia Location within the United States
- Coordinates: 38°16′52″N 80°09′30″W
- Country: United States
- State: West Virginia
- County: Pocahontas
- Elevation: 3,212 ft (979 m)
- Time zone: UTC-5 (Eastern (EST))
  - Summer (DST): UTC-4 (EDT)
- Area codes: 304 & 681
- GNIS feature ID: 1553515

Woodrow is an unincorporated community in Pocahontas County, West Virginia, United States. Woodrow is 5.5 miles (8.9 km) northwest of Marlinton.

The community was named after Woodrow Wilson, 28th President of the United States.
