= Woods =

Woods or The Woods may refer to:

== Common meanings ==
- Woodland
- Forest
- Wood, solid material from trees or shrubs

== Places ==
=== United States ===
- Woods, Kentucky
- Woods, Oregon
- Woods, a municipality in Liberty County, Florida
- The Woods, a neighborhood in Shenandoah, Louisiana

=== Elsewhere ===
- Woods, Ontario, an area of Carling, Ontario, Canada
- Woods, South Australia, an area of Owen
- The Woods, a locality in Sandwell, England

== Culture ==
=== Film ===
- The Woods (2006 film), a film directed by Lucky McKee
- The Woods (2011 film), a film directed by Matthew Lessner
- The Woods, a false working title used for the 2016 film Blair Witch (film)

=== Music ===
- The Woods (album), 2005 album by Sleater-Kinney
- Woods (band), American folk-rock band from New York
- "Woods", a song by Bon Iver from their EP Blood Bank, 2009
- "The Woods", a song by Dierks Bentley from his album Home, 2012
- "Woods", a song by Fireworks from their album Oh, Common Life, 2014
- "Woodss", a song by Psapp from their album Tourists, 2019
- "Woods", a song by Mac Miller from his album Circles, 2020

=== Other uses in culture ===
- The Woods, 2007 novel by Harlan Coben
- The Woods (play), 1977 play by David Mamet
- The Woods (comic), a graphic novel by James Tynion IV and Michael Dialynas
- The Woods (miniseries) (Polish: W głębi lasu), a Polish web television miniseries
- "Woods" (Atlanta), 2018 TV episode

== Sports ==
- Another name for lawn bowls
- Wood (golf), a type of golf club

== Other uses ==
- Woods Motor Vehicle, an American manufacturer of electric automobiles between 1899 and 1916
- Woods (surname), a family name
- Sacred woods, another term for sacred grove

== See also ==
- Woods County, Oklahoma
- Woods Estate (disambiguation)
- Wood (disambiguation)
- Wold (disambiguation)
- Justice Woods (disambiguation)
