= Wu Di =

Wu Di may refer to:

- Wu Di (cinematographer), Chinese cinematographer
- Wu Di (film critic and historian) (born 1951), Chinese film critic and historian
- Di Wu (pianist) (born 1984), Chinese-American pianist

== Sportspeople ==
- Wu Di (renju player) (born 1979), Chinese renju player
- Wu Di (softball) (born 1982), Chinese female softball player
- Wu Di (tennis) (born 1991), Chinese male tennis player
- Wu Di (basketball) (born 1993), Chinese female basketball player

== See also ==
- Wu Di, atonal pinyin for the legendary Five Emperors of early China
- Emperor Wu (disambiguation)
- Wudi (disambiguation)
