= Alan Woodrow =

Canadian opera singer (born 1952)

Alan Donald Woodrow (born 1952) is a Canadian operatic tenor.

Born in Toronto, Woodrow studied singing with George Lambert at the Royal Conservatory of Music in Toronto before pursuing further studies at the London Opera Centre. On completing these studies he joined English National Opera (ENO) as a principal tenor and quickly developed into the dramatic fach. It is in this repertoire that he has emerged at an international level. The acclaim he generated in Martinu's Greek Passion at the Edinburgh Festival brought him to the attention of major European houses. Woodrow retains a highly productive relationship with ENO and Basel Opera. He also appears in Tel Aviv, the Guelph Spring Festival, Munich Bayerische Staatsoper, Royal Albert Hall, Theater Basel, San Diego Opera, Teatro San Carlo, Teatro Massimo of Palermo, City of London Sinfonia, San Antonio Symphony, Philharmonia Orchestra, Teatro Comunale of Florence, Richard Strauss Festspiele Garmisch. Engagements this and last season include the Teatro Verdi in Trieste, Opéra de Rouen, Théâtre du Capitole at Toulouse, Teatro Massimo of Palermo and Guido Bardi in Eine florentinische Tragödie for La Scala, Milan.

Woodrow has sung extensively with major opera houses around the world. He was principal tenor for several years at English National Opera; his numerous roles there include Don José in Bizet's Carmen, Prince Andrei in Mussorgksy's Khovanschina, and the Captain in Berg's Wozzeck.

Other European credits for Woodrow include Sergei in Shostakovich's Lady Macbeth of Mtsensk at Teatro alla Scala, Paris Opéra Bastille, and Frankfurt Opera and the Emperor in Richard Strauss's Die Frau ohne Schatten at Deutsche Oper Berlin, Gran Teatre del Liceu, and Bayerische Staatsoper.

In 2000, Woodrow played the part of Tannhäuser in a DVD directed by Walter Licastro, written by Richard Wagner.

He has sung the role of Siegfried often: in Toulouse, in Perth, in Barcelona, in Manaus, in Madrid, in Liège, and at Seattle Opera for his company debut in 2001.

Woodrow returned to Seattle later that year to sing the Prince in Dvořák's Rusalka. His many roles since then have included Guido Bardi in Zemlinsky's Florentine Tragedy in Milan, and Herod in Richard Strauss's Salome in Palermo. Future plans include Tristan in Wagner's Tristan und Isolde in Toulouse and Siegfried in Berlin. He later returned to Seattle Opera to sing Alfred in Johann Strauss, Jr.'s Die Fledermaus.

Woodrow is married to British soprano Vivian Tierney and has three sons, Jonathan, Alex & David, and one daughter, Julia.

== Sources ==
- www.seattleopera.org
