= Emperor Wu =

Emperor Wu or the Wu Emperor (武帝, lit. "The Martial Emperor") is the posthumous name of numerous Chinese rulers:

- Emperor Wu of Han (156–87 BC), emperor of the Han dynasty
- Emperor Wu of Wei (AD 155–220), a posthumous name of Cao Cao
- Emperor Wu of Jin (236–290), first emperor of the Jin dynasty
- Emperor Wu of Song (363–422), founding emperor of the Chinese dynasty Liu Song
- Emperor Wu of Southern Qi (440–493), emperor of the Chinese Southern Qi Dynasty
- Emperor Wu of Liang (464–549), founding emperor of the Liang Dynasty of Chinese history
- Emperor Wu of Chen (503–559), first emperor of the Chen dynasty of China
- Emperor Wu of Northern Zhou (543–578), an emperor of the Xianbei dynasty Northern Zhou
- Empress Wu Zetian (625–705), from her actual surname rather than a posthumous epithet

Emperor of Wu (吳帝) may refer to:

- Li Zitong (died 622), agrarian rebel during the Sui–Tang interregnum
- Emperor Wu of Triệu (240 - 137 BC), emperor of the Triệu dynasty, but later change to King

== See also ==
- Wudi (disambiguation)
- Wu Di (disambiguation)
- Wu (disambiguation)
