= USS William M. Wood (DD-715) =

Gearing-class destroyer, sunk as a target

Coordinates: 18.1649°N 65.4664°W

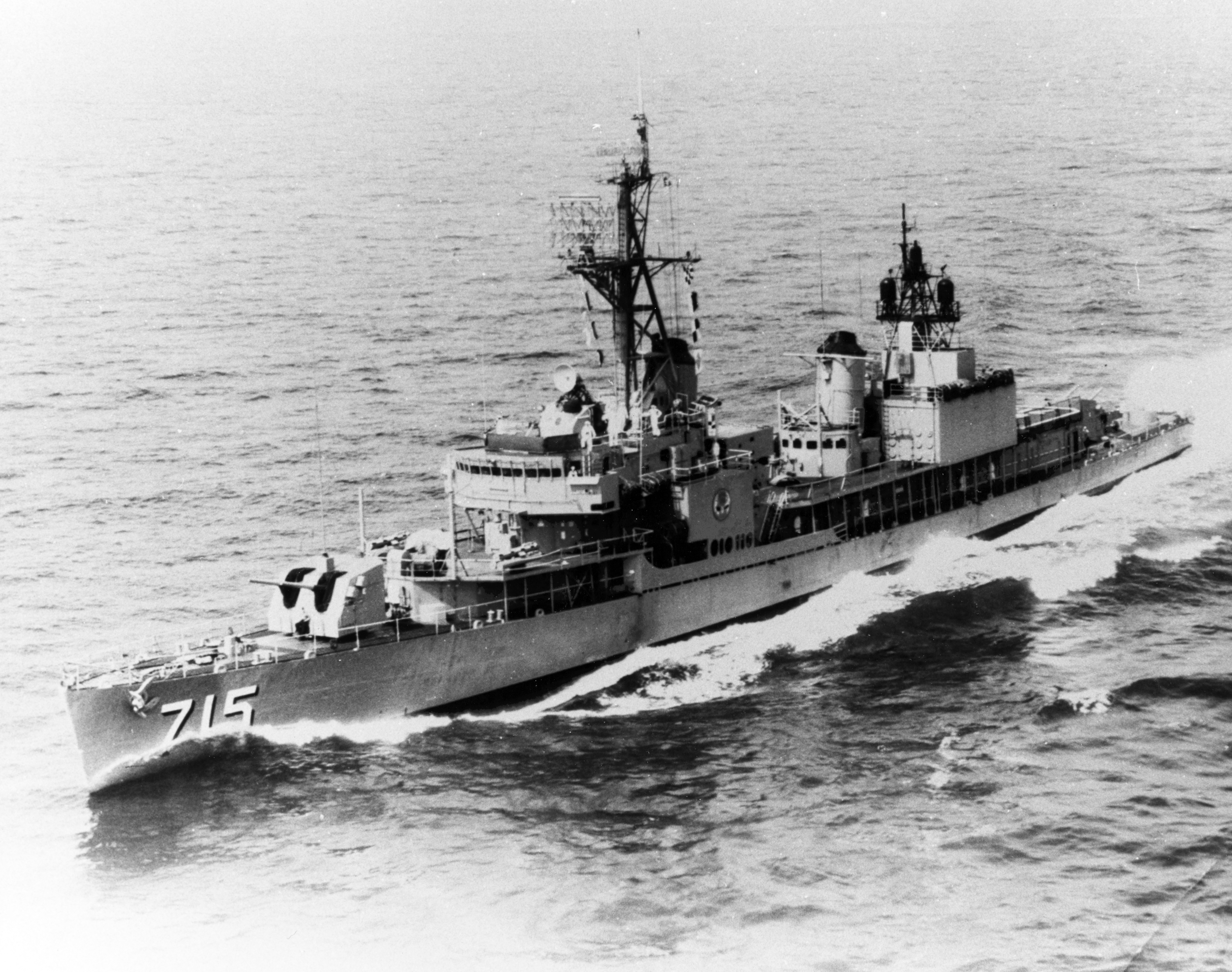
- USS William M. Wood underway in the 1960s

History

United States
- Name: USS William M. Wood
- Namesake: William Maxwell Wood
- Builder: Federal Shipbuilding & Drydock Company, Newark, New Jersey
- Laid down: 2 November 1944
- Launched: 29 July 1945
- Commissioned: 24 November 1945
- Modernized: 11 March 1965 (FRAM IB)
- Decommissioned: 1 December 1976
- Identification: Callsign: NTPC; Hull number: DDG-715
- Fate: Sunk as target off Puerto Rico during ReadEx 1-83 in March 1983

General characteristics
- Class & type: Gearing-class destroyer
- Displacement: 2,425 long tons (2,464 t)
- Length: 390 ft 6 in (119.02 m)
- Beam: 40 ft 10 in (12.45 m)
- Draft: 18 ft 6 in (5.64 m)
- Speed: 34.6 knots (64.1 km/h; 39.8 mph)
- Armament: 6 × 5-inch/38-caliber guns; 12 × 40 mm AA guns; 4 × 20 mm AA guns; 5 × 21 inch (533 mm) torpedo tubes; 6 × depth charge projectors; 2 × depth charge tracks

USS William M. Wood (DD/DDR-715) was a Gearing-class destroyer in the United States Navy during the final year of World War II. She was in commission for 31 years, from 1945 through 1976, serving in both the Pacific and Atlantic Fleets. She was the second Navy ship named for Navy Surgeon-General William M. Wood (1809–1880).

William M. Wood was laid down on 2 November 1944 at Newark, New Jersey, by the Federal Shipbuilding & Drydock Company; launched on 29 July 1945; sponsored by Mrs. Joseph P. Tracy; and commissioned at the New York Naval Shipyard on 24 November 1945.

== 1945–1949 ==
Following shakedown out of Guantánamo Bay, Cuba, and type training in the Norfolk, Virginia area, William M. Wood operated in the Caribbean Sea from April to June 1946. In June, she was reassigned to the Pacific Fleet. She arrived in San Diego, California during the first week in July but departed there a week later, bound for Hawaii. The destroyer operated out of Pearl Harbor from mid-July to late September, when she received orders to duty along the coast of China. The warship arrived in Tsingtao, China, near the middle of October and began patrolling the Yellow Sea between northern China and Korea in an effort to stem postwar smuggling. That task lasted until February 1947 when she headed back to the United States, arriving in San Diego early in March.

During the following six months, William M. Wood conducted type training along the Pacific coast and underwent a three-month overhaul. In October 1947, the destroyer joined Destroyer Division (DesDiv) 131 in screening the aircraft carrier Valley Forge on an extended voyage to the western Pacific. In the ensuing seven months, the ships called at Sydney, Australia; Hong Kong; Shanghai and Tsingtao in China; and Yokosuka, Japan. She returned to San Diego with the unit in May 1948 and resumed normal training and upkeep operations which were broken once by a two-month overhaul at the Mare Island Naval Shipyard.

On 1 April 1949, a new fleet organization was promulgated reassigning William M. Wood to the Atlantic Fleet. The destroyer, however, remained on the west coast until 5 October, when she finally sailed for her new home port, Newport, R.I. She reported for duty with the Destroyer Force, Atlantic Fleet (DesLant) on 21 October. The warship served DesLant as a school ship training junior officers in gunnery and engineering.

== 1950–1959 ==
In May 1950, the warship participated in a Navy-Marine Corps amphibious exercise conducted on the North Carolina coast. During the following month, she conducted underway training out of Newport. July brought a brief tour of duty in Caribbean waters with a hunter/killer group and a quick visit to Iceland.

The destroyer returned to Newport in August but put to sea the next month for the first of many deployments with the 6th Fleet in the Mediterranean Sea. After two months of duty, however, William M. Wood left the 6th Fleet to resume operations out of United States ports. Following a brief leave and upkeep period at Newport, the destroyer moved south to Pensacola, Florida, where she served for a time as plane guard for the aircraft carrier Monterey during carrier qualifications.

At the conclusion of that assignment, she returned to normal duty out of Newport. In January 1952, she embarked upon her second Mediterranean cruise. That tour of duty lasted seven months during which time she participated in several NATO multinational exercises. That tour of duty also included visits to ports in the United Kingdom, Belgium, and Germany. She returned to Newport in July and, after a voyage to Halifax, Nova Scotia in company with the aircraft carrier Midway late in September, entered the Boston Naval Shipyard to begin conversion to a radar picket destroyer. She was placed out of commission on 2 October 1952 and redesignated DDR-715.

William M. Wood completed her conversion to a radar picket destroyer during the summer of 1953 and was recommissioned on 6 June 1953. Following a shakedown cruise to Guantánamo Bay, Cuba, that fall, she began her third tour of duty with the 6th Fleet in November. At the end of several weeks of operations with the 6th Fleet, the radar picket destroyer returned to Norfolk early in February 1954.

The following month, she journeyed south to Pensacola, where she once again performed plane guard duties for Monterey during carrier qualifications. The summer of 1954 brought the ship a two-month midshipman cruise to European waters where she made port calls at Cádiz, Spain, and Rotterdam in the Netherlands. She returned to Norfolk in August and spent the remainder of 1954 engaged in training operations. In January 1955, she embarked upon her fourth deployment to the Mediterranean. Again, NATO exercises and port visits at various points along the Mediterranean littoral kept the ship busy. She was in port at Voles, Greece, between 19 and 21 April, during which time the city suffered a series of severe earthquakes. She remained there after the disaster and rendered all possible aid to the victims.

Returning to the United States that summer, she entered the Philadelphia Naval Shipyard for a major overhaul. That fall, the warship conducted refresher training and then returned to Norfolk to prepare for her upcoming Mediterranean deployment. That tour of duty began in February 1956 and ended the following June. Between June and October, she operated out of Norfolk along the coasts of the Carolinas, Georgia, and Florida conducting air defense exercises. Mounting tensions in the Middle East precipitated an Israeli invasion of the Egyptian Sinai on 29 October, and William M. Wood hastened to the eastern Mediterranean in November to join Task Force (TF) 26.

The warship began 1957 with Operation Springboard, conducted in the West Indies in January and February. In March, she escorted Canberra when that cruiser carried President Dwight D. Eisenhower to Bermuda to confer with British Prime Minister Harold Macmillan. William M. Wood provided transportation for the members of the press who covered the President's visit. In June, she entered the Norfolk Naval Shipyard for a three-month overhaul.

Following that, she conducted refresher training out of Guantánamo Bay, Cuba, for six weeks. In November, the destroyer resumed normal duty out of Norfolk, Virginia with the Atlantic Fleet. She began 1958 the same way she began 1957, with "Springboard" exercises in the Caribbean Sea during January and February. Then in June, at the conclusion of three months of normal Atlantic Fleet duty, the warship embarked upon a Mediterranean Sea cruise.

Not long after her arrival in the Mediterranean, fighting erupted in Lebanon. The intensification of the strife prompted the pro-western Lebanese President Chamoun to seek military help from the United States. President Eisenhower responded immediately by sending Marine Corps units ashore in the troubled country and stationing 6th Fleet ships offshore to support them. During the period 14 July and 3 September, William M. Wood spent 40 days on station patrolling off the Lebanese coast. Following brief visits to İzmir, Turkey; Naples, Italy; and Gibraltar, she headed back to Norfolk and arrived there on 30 September. Normal Atlantic Fleet operations, including exercises along the coast and in the Caribbean, ensued.

== 1960–1969 ==
Over the next decade, William M. Wood continued to alternate 6th Fleet deployments with duty along the Atlantic coast and in the Caribbean area. In August 1962, she returned to the United States from her 10th Mediterranean assignment and resumed operations out of Norfolk.

That employment, however, was interrupted in October when President John F. Kennedy declared the "quarantine" of Cuba in response to the siting of offensive, nuclear missiles on the island. For 57 days, William M. Wood participated in the quasi-blockade patrols conducted around Cuba to prevent the importation of further missiles and to ensure the removal of those already there.

At the successful conclusion of that mission, the warship resumed normal east coast operations. In February 1963, members of Venezuela's communist insurgent group, the FALN, hijacked the Venezuelan freighter, SS Anzoategui, and William M. Wood joined ships from several navies in an international search for the merchant ship. Their efforts proved to be in vain for the terrorists eluded capture, entered the Brazilian port of Belém, and received political asylum.

Following her return from her 11th Mediterranean deployment in the spring of 1964, William M. Wood entered the Philadelphia Naval Shipyard on 18 May 1964 to begin a Fleet Rehabilitation and Modernization (FRAM) overhaul. During that period, she was converted from a radar picket destroyer back to an all-purpose destroyer. She was redesignated DD-715 on 1 July 1964 and completed her FRAM conversion on 11 March 1965 when she headed back to Norfolk to rejoin the Atlantic Fleet.

In the midst of her post-overhaul refresher training, a revolution broke out in the Dominican Republic on 24 April. On the 29th, the destroyer received orders interrupting her refresher training, and she hastened to the scene of the conflict to protect foreign nationals caught in the middle and to support an American, and later, multinational expeditionary force dispatched to the island by the Organization of American States. The situation was soon stabilized, and William M. Wood began a coastal patrol and surveillance assignment. While so engaged, she picked up 13 foreigners, including some American citizens, who requested evacuation. These people were transferred to Pawcatuck on 7 May; and, the following day, O'Hare relieved her on station off the Dominican Republic. William M. Wood then resumed refresher training and completed it on 20 May.

On 18 June, after post-refresher availability at Norfolk, the destroyer embarked upon another tour of duty in the Mediterranean with the 6th Fleet and continued alternating such deployments with normal duty out of Norfolk with the Atlantic Fleet. During 1968, she operated with the antisubmarine warfare (ASW) forces attached to the Atlantic Fleet. In May and June 1968, she participated in the unsuccessful search for the nuclear attack submarine Scorpion reported missing on 27 May. She closed the year in overhaul at Norfolk.

During her last eight years of active service, William M. Wood made two more routine Mediterranean cruises and then served there on a three-year extended deployment. During the first of her last two normal Mediterranean deployments, which lasted from 12 November 1969 to 22 May 1970, she shadowed two new Soviet ships, Moskva and Leningrad, to gather intelligence on the new hermaphrodite cruisers/ASW carriers. The second of the two cruises lasted from 8 February to 23 July 1971 and consisted of more routine 6th Fleet operations, mostly training exercises both multinational and unilateral.

== 1970–1977 ==
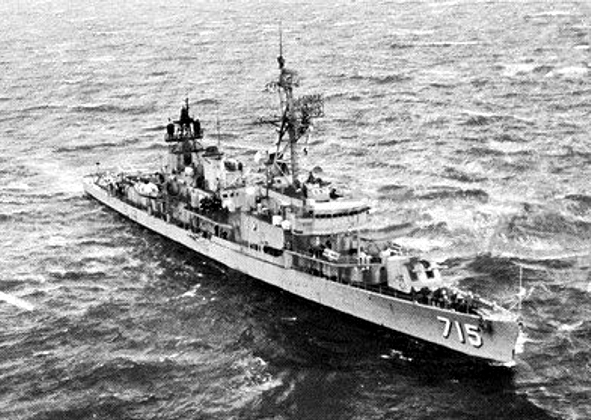
William M. Wood operating with Franklin D. Roosevelt in the Mediterranean Sea, 1971.

Following almost 13 months of 2nd Fleet operations during late 1971 and early 1972, the warship embarked upon an extended assignment to the 6th Fleet on 18 August. Her home port was officially changed to Elefsis (Athens), Greece, from which port she operated for almost three years. The warship spent most of her time during that period engaged in training operations with other units of the 6th Fleet and with elements of Allied navies, including conducting surveillance of the Soviet Fleet in the Mediterranean. She also made several forays into the Black Sea for special operations (Operation Silver Fox). In July and August 1974, she conducted continuous patrols in the vicinity of Crete during the Turkish invasion of Cyprus.

Her extended deployment with the 6th Fleet ended in June 1975 when she began a long voyage home. The destroyer visited ports in France, Germany, Denmark, England, and Bermuda before arriving back in Norfolk on 23 July. While the rest of her squadron received overhauls, William M Wood was placed in a floating dry dock for a modified maintenance period. She qualified for 5"/38 barrel replacements and new sonar dome but not installed for fears it would delay her last Med deployment in January 1976. While deployed escorting amphibious task force anchored at East of Crete anchorage, she detected a Soviet submarine and alerted other destroyers and they began to hold down the sub. It became known as the East of Crete Hold Down. A new record for submerged endurance of Soviet Foxtrot class subs was established. She returned to the United States that summer and resumed 2nd Fleet operations. On 1 December 1976, she was placed out of commission at Norfolk, and her name was struck from the Navy List that same day.

== 1978–1983 ==
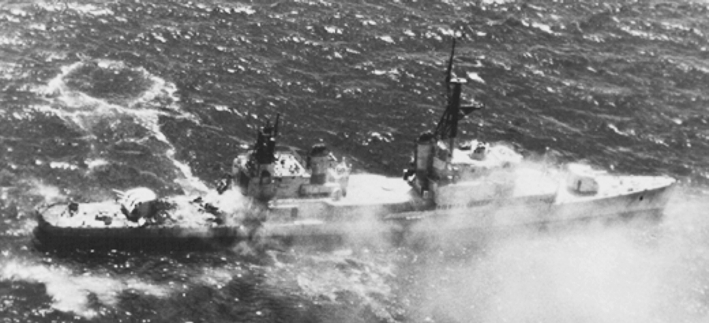
William M. Wood as a target ship off Puerto Rico, in 1983.

She was transferred to the US Naval Shipyard in Philadelphia, Pennsylvania, where she remained until 1983. While there, certain equipment and parts were removed and used in the restoration of the museum ship USS Joseph P. Kennedy, Jr., currently berthed in Fall River, Massachusetts, and open to the public.

She was sunk by eight Harpoon missiles off Puerto Rico during Operation ReadEx 1-83 in March 1983. It was reported that the ship went neutrally buoyant at a depth of 200 feet and the sinking had to be finished by a submarine-fired torpedo. Operation ReadEx 1-83 was a major naval exercise involving approximately 70 ships in multiple battle groups conducted in the Puerto Rico Operations Area.

== Awards ==
William M. Wood earned:

- Navy Expeditionary Medal (Cuban Missile Crisis)
- China Service Medal
- WWII Victory Medal
- Navy Occupation Medal(Asia)
- National Defense Service Medal
- Armed Forces Expeditionary Medal (Lebanon)
- Sea Service Ribbon
