= Woodie's =

Irish DIY store chain

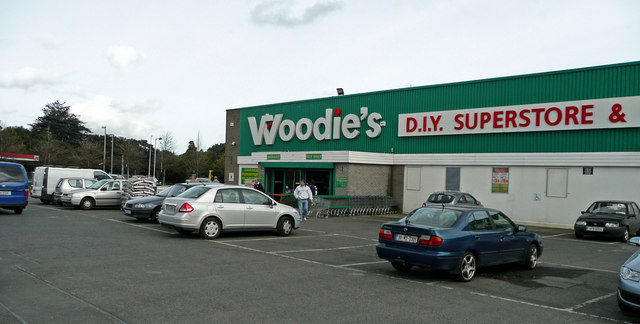
- A Woodie's DIY store in Glasnevin, Dublin
- Formerly: Woodie's DIY; Pay Less DIY
- Company type: Subsidiary
- Industry: Retail; Home improvement
- Founded: June 1987; 39 years ago in Walkinstown, Dublin, Ireland
- Number of locations: 35 (2022)
- Area served: Ireland
- Products: Decorative; DIY; Power tools; Hand tools; Housewares; Plumbing accessories; Ironmongery; Gardening
- Revenue: ▲€345.4 million (2021)
- Net income: ▲£50.9 million (2021)
- Number of employees: 1,400 (2022)
- Parent: Grafton Group
- Website: www.woodies.ie

Woodie's is an Irish DIY and home improvement retailing company. Founded in 1987 in Walkinstown, Dublin and opening the first shop in the same year, it is a part of Grafton Group plc. Woodie's is a nationwide company, having over thirty shops in Ireland. It operationally merged with Atlantic Homecare, the consumer division of Heiton Group that was acquired by Grafton Group in 2005, with all Atlantic Homecare shops eventually being rebranded as Woodie's after Atlantic Homecare entered examinership in 2012.

== History ==
=== 1987 to 1990 ===
The company was founded in the summer of 1987, and the first shop opened in Walkinstown under the name 'Pay Less DIY'. The success of this shop then led to the opening of a second shop in Glasnevin in April 1988. The continued successes of the retail operations led to two new shop openings in 1990, one in Sallynoggin and the other in Cork. In 1989, ‘Pay Less DIY’ was purchased by the Grafton Group and was rebranded as Woodie's DIY.

=== 1990 to present ===
In the early 2000s, Woodie's DIY entered a phase of rapid expansion and in 2005, the business acquired sixteen Atlantic Homecare shops which brought the total number of locations to its present figure. In 2015, the parent company saw a huge boost in sales and also noticed a positive performance in the business. Woodie's DIY proceeded to perform strongly as growth in house prices increased the need for residential repair and maintenance.

=== Rebranding ===
Woodie's DIY underwent rebranding in early 2014 where they changed their logo and TV advertising campaign. During this period they also dropped "DIY" from the name and the store would now just be "Woodie's". This was done to modernise the brand.
