= Hannah Primrose, Countess of Rosebery =

Countess of Rosebery (1851–1890)

Hannah, Countess of Rosebery, painted by Frederic, Lord Leighton

Hannah Primrose, Countess of Rosebery (née de Rothschild; 27 July 1851 – 19 November 1890) was the daughter of Baron Mayer de Rothschild and his wife Juliana (née Cohen). After inheriting her father's fortune in 1874, she became the richest woman in Britain. In 1878, Hannah de Rothschild married Archibald Primrose, 5th Earl of Rosebery, and was thereafter known as the Countess of Rosebery.

During the final quarter of the 19th century, her husband, the Earl of Rosebery, was one of the most celebrated figures in Britain, an influential millionaire and politician, whose charm, wit, charisma and public popularity gave him such standing that he "almost eclipsed that of Royalty". The Countess remains an enigmatic figure, and is often regarded as notable only for financing her husband's three ambitions: to marry an heiress, win The Derby, and become Prime Minister (the second and third of these possibly apocryphal ambitions were achieved after her death).

Her marriage into the aristocracy, while controversial at the time, gave her the social cachet in an antisemitic society that her vast fortune could not. She subsequently became a political hostess and philanthropist. Her charitable work was principally in the sphere of public health and causes associated with the welfare of working-class Jewish women living in the poorer districts of London.

Having firmly assisted and supported her husband on his path, she suddenly died in 1890, aged 39.

== Early years ==
Baron Mayer de Rothschild, father of Hannah de Rothschild

Hannah de Rothschild was born in 1851 into a world of great wealth and luxury. She was the granddaughter of Baron Nathan Mayer Rothschild, who had founded N M Rothschild & Sons, the English branch of the Rothschilds' banking empire. Niall Ferguson states in his History of the House of Rothschild that by the mid-19th century the Rothschilds regarded themselves as the nearest thing the Jews of Europe had to a royal family, and the equals of royalty. The many Rothschild houses and art collections, in England, Austria, France, and Germany, rivalled those of the crowned heads of Europe, Mentmore in particular being one of the most outstanding art collections of its kind anywhere in the world.

Hannah de Rothschild's father Baron Meyer Amschel de Rothschild married his cousin Juliana Cohen in 1850. The marriage provided the impetus for Meyer to create what he described as "an enduring monument", a country house of monumental proportions. His daughter Hannah, aged just five months, helped lay the foundation stone on 31 December 1851.

Within a few years of the mansion's completion, attracted by the good hunting and proximity to London, Hannah's relatives began to build estates nearby, all within a carriage drive of each other; thus, Hannah grew up in an almost private world of unimaginable splendour and security. Nikolaus Pevsner described this enclave of Rothschild properties as "the most conspicuous and significant aspect of Victorian architecture in Buckinghamshire". In addition to Mentmore, Baron and Baroness Meyer de Rothschild had a large house in London, 107 Piccadilly, and The Zenaide, a luxurious yacht, upon which Hanna's mother died in 1877, the year before her marriage.

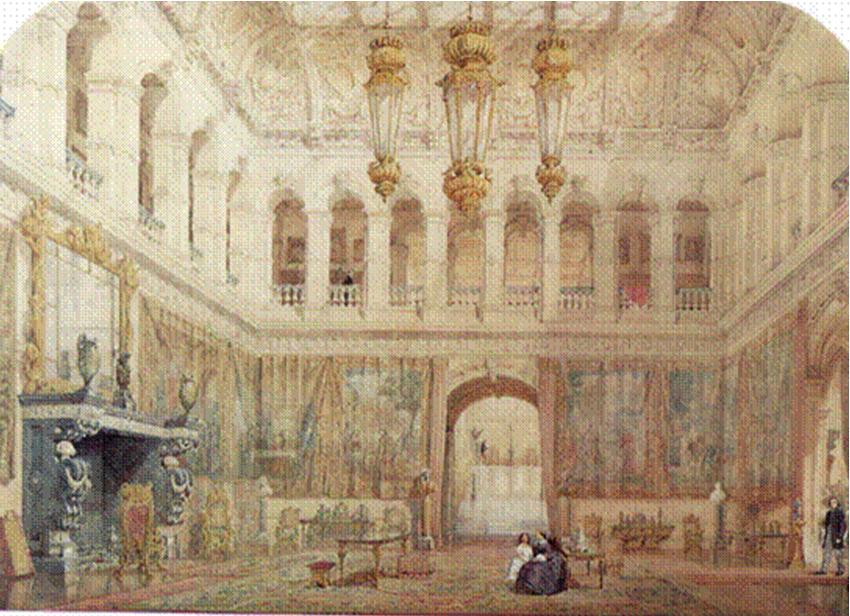
Hannah de Rothschild and her mother in the Grand Hall at Mentmore

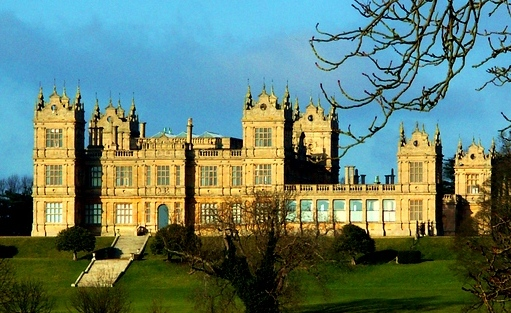
At 23, Hannah de Rothschild inherited Mentmore, built by her father in the 1850s.

She was a companion to her hypochondriac mother and, in later life, a hostess with her father during her mother's long periods of indisposition. Hannah was indulged by both parents and her formal education was neglected in favour of music and singing lessons, subjects in which she was 'skilled' and had a 'decided gift'. Her parents were very protective of her, attempting to ensure that she was never exposed to the risk of sickness or even the sight of poverty. As a result, she was never allowed to enter the cottages on the Rothschilds' estates. Lady Battersea claimed that Hannah was so sheltered that the phrase "'the poor'" was "merely a phraseology for her". Whatever the faults of her education, she possessed great confidence, impressing her Rothschild relations, who noted her poise and competence when she hosted a large house party at Mentmore for the Prince of Wales while only 17 years of age. A year later, in 1869, Hannah made her formal entrance into society as a debutante, when she was presented to Queen Victoria at Buckingham Palace by her mother.

Mayer Amschel de Rothschild died in 1874, leaving his daughter not only Mentmore (with its priceless art collection), his London mansion, and innumerable investments, but also the sum of two million pounds sterling in cash (equivalent to £196 million in present-day terms). Thus, Hannah de Rothschild became the wealthiest woman in England.

== Betrothal ==
Hannah de Rothschild was first introduced to her future husband, the 28-year-old Earl of Rosebery, by Lady Beaconsfield, the wife of Benjamin Disraeli, at Newmarket Racecourse. The Disraelis were close friends and neighbours of the Rothschilds in Buckinghamshire. In 1901 Rosebery, in an interview with the Daily Mail, claimed to have met Hannah when their carriages crashed and he 'sprang out and saved her'; however, this version of their meeting is believed to be a romanticised fabrication of Rosebery's.

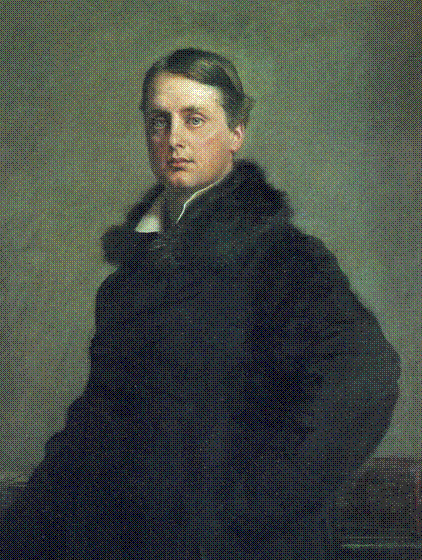
Archibald, Earl of Rosebery—"A strikingly handsome man and immensely cultivated", but "A dowryless marriage would have meant a reduced scale of living of a kind galling to a proud nature."

Archibald, 5th Earl of Rosebery, born in 1847, had inherited his title from his grandfather in 1868, aged 21, together with an income of £30,000 a year. He owned 40,000 acres (160 km^{2}) in Scotland, and land in Norfolk, Hertfordshire, and Kent. His father had died when he was eight and he had been brought up by his mother, who had subsequently married Harry Powlett, 4th Duke of Cleveland. His mother was a distant figure, and their relationship was always strained. The Earls of Rosebery, whose family name was Primrose, were old, if undistinguished, members of the Scottish aristocracy. Rosebery was considered to be strikingly handsome and immensely cultivated. He was highly intelligent, and a brilliant future was forecast for him by his tutors at both Eton and Christ Church, Oxford.

As early as 1876, there were rumours of an engagement. However, several hurdles had to be overcome before a marriage could take place. While the Jewish Rothschilds were accepted into society, and indeed were close friends of some members of the royal family including the Prince of Wales, as elsewhere in Europe, antisemitic feelings were prevalent in the upper echelons of society; this was particularly so among those closest to the Queen at court where, following the death of the Prince Consort in 1861, the Rothschilds became pointedly excluded. The Queen's equerry Arthur Edward Hardinge referred to the Rothschilds' dining tables as "resplendent with the Hebrew gold" going so far as to say a visiting Russian royal needed a "corrective" visit to Westminster Abbey following acceptance of Rothschild hospitality. Queen Victoria herself expressed antisemitic views in 1873 when it was proposed that Lionel de Rothschild be elevated to the peerage; the Queen refused, and expressed a reluctance to make a Jew a peer, saying that "to make a Jew a peer is a step she could not consent to" and furthermore stating that to give "a title and mark of her approbation to a Jew" was something she would not do. Lord Spencer advised the Prince and Princess of Wales against attending a Rothschild ball with the words "The Prince ought only to visit those of undoubted position in Society." However, this did not prevent the Prince from accepting Rothschild's invitations and gifts privately. While one could be friends with Jews and accept their hospitality, their social status was still not sufficiently elevated to include marriage into the peerage without unfavourable comment.

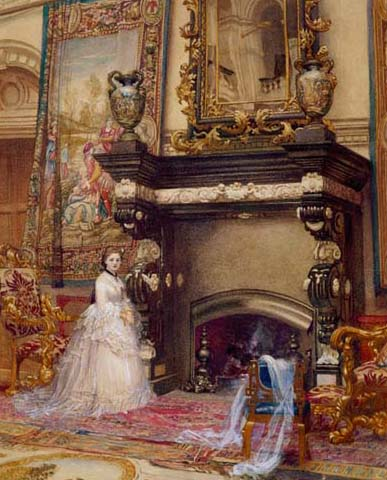
Hannah de Rothschild as a young woman at Mentmore

Rosebery's own mother was horrified at the thought of a Jewish woman, even a Rothschild, in the family. Rosebery too felt there was an impassable barrier of faith. This factor also worked in reverse; while Hannah de Rothschild was keen to marry Rosebery, she was also aware of many obstacles, the foremost being that she was devoted to her faith, and to leave it would be a severe moral wrench. Another obstacle was the Rothschild family itself: it was their custom to marry cousins to keep their fortune within the family. Ironically, Hannah herself had opposed the marriage of her cousin Annie de Rothschild to the Christian Eliot Constantine Yorke, the son of the Earl of Hardwicke, in 1866. In fact, she was to be the third daughter of the family's English branch to marry outside of the Jewish faith, but such was the fame of the bridegroom and the resultant publicity that the Jewish elders and press felt an example needed to be made. The Jewish Chronicle announced its "most poignant grief" at the prospect, and cryptically added, "If the flame seize on the cedars, how will fare the hyssop on the wall: if the leviathan is brought up with a hook, how will the minnows escape,"

The formal engagement of marriage was announced on 3 January 1878, a day Rosebery forever afterwards regarded as sacred. Writing to a friend in January 1878, Rosebery described his wife as "very simple, very unspoilt, very clever, very warm-hearted and very shy... I never knew such a beautiful character." The marriage was celebrated in London on 20 March 1878 at the Board Room of Guardians in Mount Street, and also in a Christian ceremony at Christ Church in Down Street, Piccadilly. To show "official" disapproval, no male member of the Rothschild family attended the ceremonies.

== Marriage ==
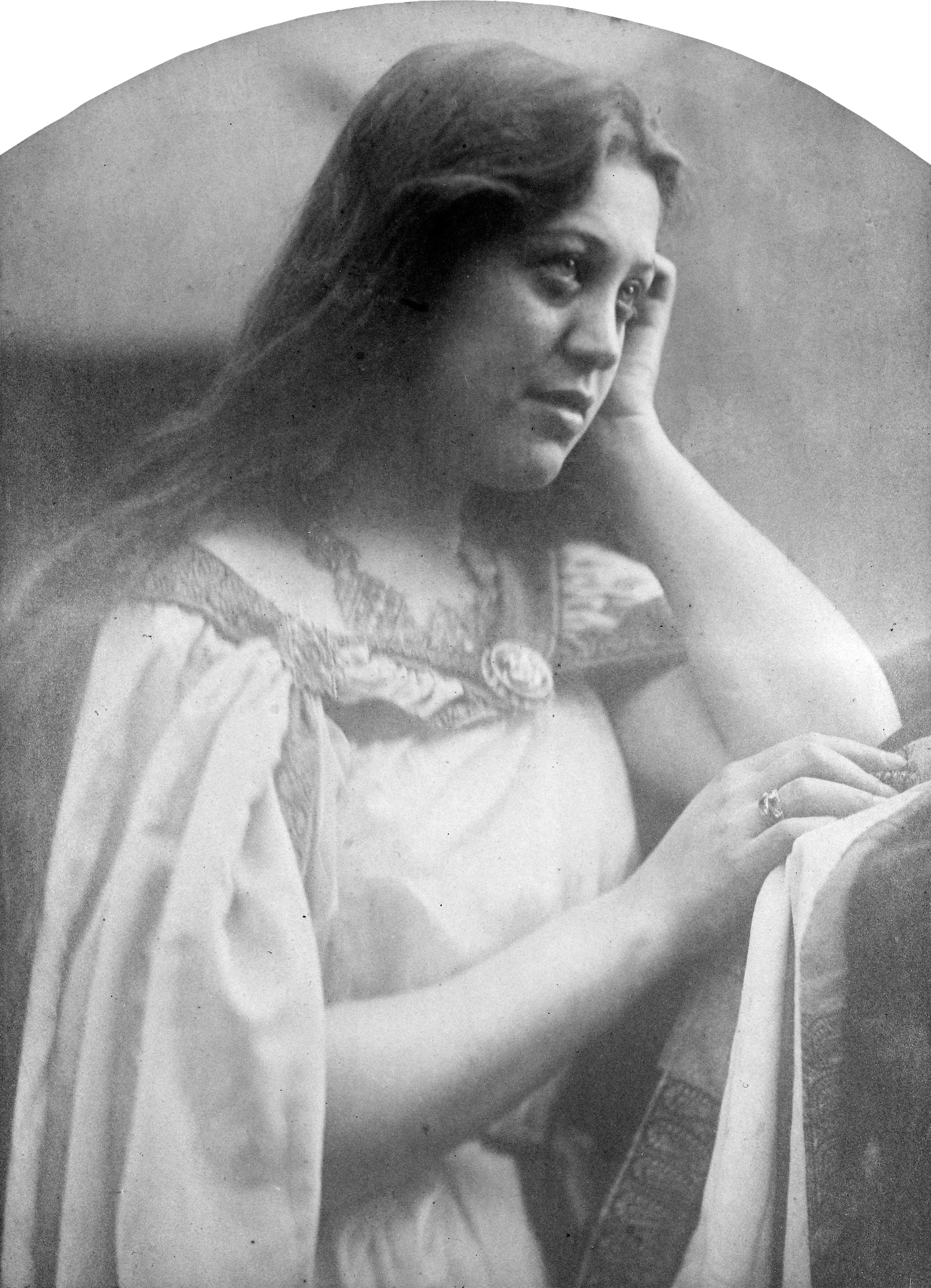
Hannah de Rothschild aged 20, photographed by Julia Margaret Cameron

For the first few years following their marriage, the Roseberys resided in London in the Piccadilly house Lady Rosebery had inherited from her father. As the couple's social and political interests increased from 1882, they leased the larger Lansdowne House. Lansdowne House was one of the finest of the aristocratic palaces in London, well suited to be the home of the political salon which Hannah Rosebery was to establish. Here political and social leaders of the day mixed with royalty, authors such as Henry James and Oscar Wilde, and other prominent social and intellectual figures of the time. Henry James, an occasional guest of the Roseberys, delivered one of the most unflattering condemnations of Lady Rosebery describing her as "... large, coarse, Hebrew-looking with hair of no particular colour and personally unattractive".

The Roseberys divided their year among their various residences: London for the social season and parliament, Mentmore at weekends to entertain both political and shooting house-parties. In August the household would move north to Dalmeny for the grouse shooting. In between, occasional days and the weeklong Derby meeting would be spent at "The Durdans" in Epsom. Though small by comparison to their other houses, this mansion was described by Henry James as the most homely and comfortable of the Roseberys' many lodgings and as a delightful house full of books and sporting pictures, with just a few Gainsboroughs and Watteaux.

=== Relationship with Rosebery ===
Published commentators on the Roseberys claim their marriage was happy, and no evidence suggests Hannah was anything other than happy in her marriage. However, much evidence suggests that Rosebery was at times irritated and bored by Hannah, who was always keen to accommodate his every whim.

Rosebery the popular idol; his image was used to decorate cigar boxes.

At times, Lady Rosebery's devotion to her husband was tested. Rosebery may not have been antisemitic before his marriage; however, the acerbic wit for which he was famous led him to make remarks that could be taken that way once his marriage secured the Rothschild fortune. Rosebery seems to have disliked his first son, whom he claimed looked "Jewish." On seeing his son for the first time he remarked "Le Jew est fait, rien ne vas plus," Rosebery replied in a letter of congratulations on the birth of his heir from Mary Gladstone: "I cannot pretend to be much excited by an event which occurs to almost every human being and which may cause me a great deal of annoyance." Rosebery then left his newborn child and wife (who was again pregnant) for a year-long tour of Australia. On another occasion, when the Roseberys were travelling in India, Rosebery is reported to have announced "I will travel ahead, Hannah and the rest of the heavy baggage will follow the next day."

While the marriage was based on warmth and esteem on Rosebery's side and adoration on Hannah's, it seems that Rosebery often found his wife's devotion irritating, and this sometimes caused him to be impatient with her. He was often abrupt with her in public. She, by contrast, was completely enraptured by him, and would frequently ignore her neighbours at a dinner party to listen to her husband's conversation further down the table, a faux pas almost considered a crime in Victorian society. Those who saw the couple alone at home "could not doubt the affection as well as the comprehension that united them".

Rosebery's behaviour could be eccentric. Gladstone remarked that Rosebery was, perhaps, rather too concerned with his health. Early in the marriage Rosebery decided to renovate the small ruined Barnbougle Castle (the original Rosebery family seat), close to, and within sight of, Dalmeny House. Once renovation was complete in 1882, Rosebery used it as a private retreat from his family, and began to spend his nights there alone. Always an insomniac, he claimed that the "stillness of the waters" [the nearby Firth of Forth] "were conducive to sleep". , During their marriage the Roseberys travelled extensively, usually without their children. In September 1883, the couple left their children in the care of the nannies and nursery maids, supervised by Rosebery's sister Lady Leconfield, for a long tour of America and Australia. Lady Rosebery owned large investments in North America, including ranches in Texas and mines in Montana. Their arrival in New York was widely reported, and The Herald published a full and flattering description of Lady Rosebery. The newspaper went on to describe Rosebery as looking like a prosperous farmer. Lady Rosebery was very taken with California, from where she wrote: "The inhabitants are very entertaining ... the women are very handsome, think nothing of dresses costing £80, "fix up" their faces very frequently and are generally divorced."

Hannah de Rothschild, Countess of Rosebery

Rosebery's frequent absences from his wife fuelled gossip that he was a secret homosexual. It has been claimed that the inscrutable air that Rosebery wore was a mask to disguise his secret homosexual life. The worry of this illegal secret, it was claimed, and fear of exposure, caused his insomnia and bouts of depression. It was even whispered that his Barnbougle Castle retreat was really a venue for clandestine assignations with young men. Rosebery's possible homosexuality has been much discussed in recent times. Nothing conclusive has ever been found one way or the other, but it is possible that he had homosexual experiences while in the care of a paedophile housemaster at Eton in his youth. No evidence exists that his wife was aware of these rumours against her husband.

Rosebery, a self-centred, reserved man, prone to depression, pessimism and insecurity, had a difficult relationship with his mother, who had been distant and openly preferred his younger brother. Lady Rosebery, an orphan and only child, appears to have been desperate to lavish affection. Once upon entering a book shop she told her children they were entering a toy shop, and when the disappointed children pointed out the obvious she replied "to your father this is a toy shop." Lord Rosebery's friend Edward Hamilton recorded her "notable faculty of getting other people to work and quickening their energies". It seems she was the driving force of the relationship, with her feet firmly on the ground. She made herself the link between the world and her "thin skinned and neurotic" husband.

=== Children ===
The Roseberys' daughter Lady Sibyl Primrose (1879–1955) painted by Frederic, Lord Leighton

The marriage produced four children: Lady Sybil Primrose, born in 1879; Lady Margaret Primrose, born in 1881; the heir Harry Primrose, Lord Dalmeny (later 6th Earl of Rosebery), born in 1882; and finally the Honourable Neil Primrose, born the same year as his elder brother.

== Politics ==
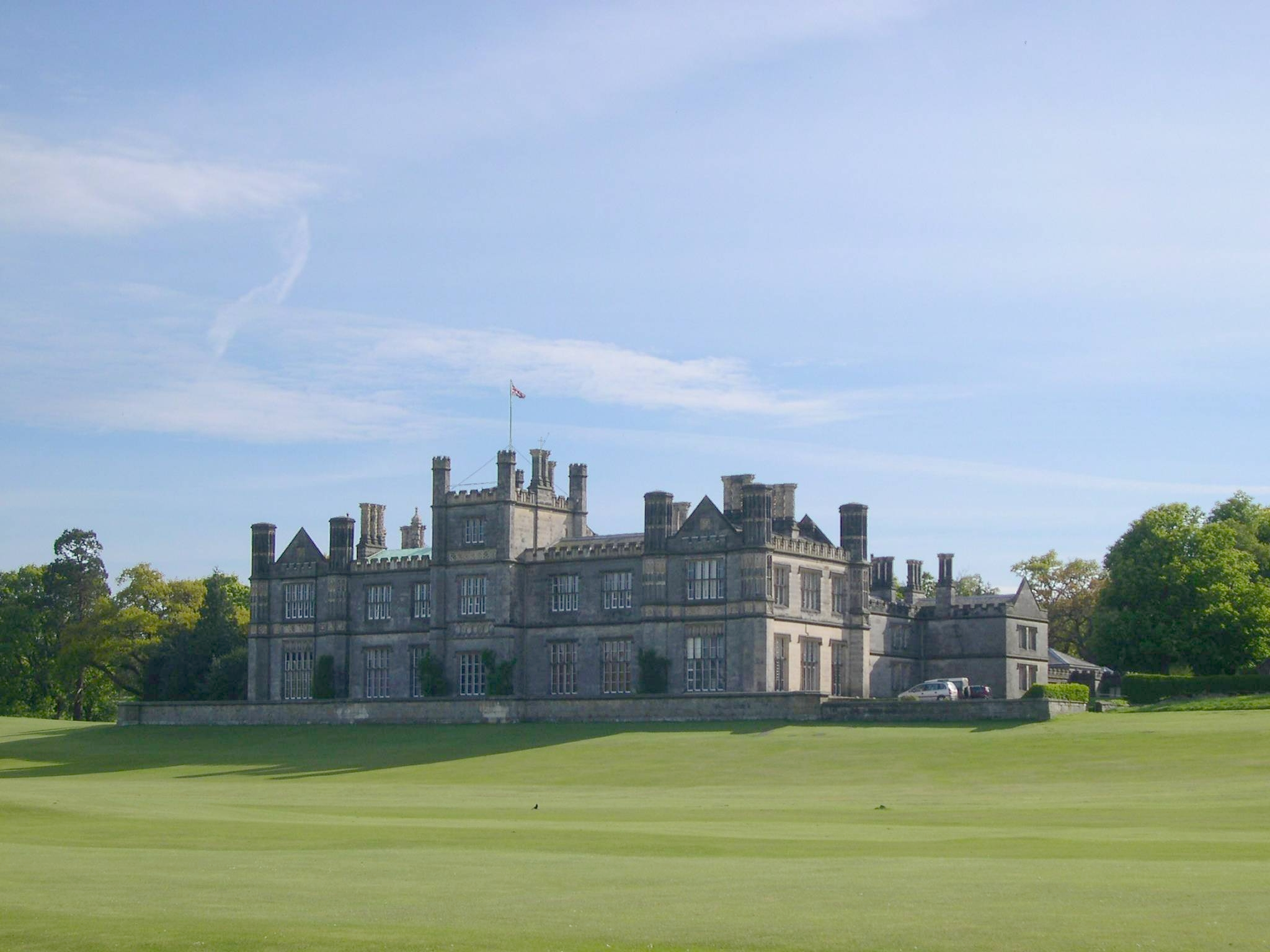
Dalmeny House was the ancestral seat of the Earls of Rosebery and the setting for Lord and Lady Rosebery's political houseparties.

It has been said of Hannah de Rothschild that she grew up with a good sense and presence of mind, enabling her to deputise for her mother on grand social occasions at Mentmore and in London. This gave her confidence and the experience to be the perfect political wife. Marriage to her altered Rosebery's status, too: while his wife acquired Christian respectability and a title, Rosebery moved from being one of many wealthy and capable young noblemen to being one with unfathomable riches.

From the outset of the marriage, political members of the Rothschild family took an interest in Rosebery, and he was soon acclaimed as one of the rising hopes of the Liberal Party. As a hereditary peer, he already had a seat in the House of Lords and had made his maiden speech there on attaining his majority. But brilliant as he was, Rosebery tended to lethargy and boredom. Lord Granville in fact considered Rosebery's wife to be the more ambitious of the pair, and even advised her "If you keep him up to the mark, [he] is sure to have his page in history." The subtle driving of her often languid and lethargic husband to achieve his "page in history" was to become her raison d'être. Rosebery's secretary Thomas Gilmour noted: "She is thoroughly genuine and very tender and devoted to Lord Rosebery, it is easy to see that she is very proud of him, and she is a woman of considerable force of character and great energy, she may prove to be a powerful ally in his political career."

Rosebery was not a natural politician. He was an idealist who disliked the rancour of politics, in fact "his innate dislike of politics was something Lady Rosebery always fought against." However, he was a gifted orator, and this was an era when platform speaking was beginning to replace House of Commons debate.

=== Midlothian campaign ===
A house party at Dalmeny during the Midlothian campaign. Gladstone is seated centre (holding his hat) with Mrs Gladstone seated next to him. Hannah Rosebery stands third from right. Lord Rosebery is seated on the ground on the right.

This first became evident in the great campaign to re-elect Gladstone, culminating in the 1880 general election. Known today as the Midlothian campaign, it was masterminded by the Roseberys. Rosebery used his influence to have Gladstone invited to stand as parliamentary candidate for Midlothian, near to Rosebery's Dalmeny estate. Gladstone had nominally retired from politics after losing his Greenwich seat in 1874, when Disraeli had been swept to power. The campaign was based at Dalmeny where Lady Rosebery hosted a series of large political house parties throughout the long campaign. The Tories were later to claim that Rosebery had paid for Gladstone's campaign. Rosebery later admitted to spending £50,000.

The Roseberys' house party would leave Dalmeny and tour towns and cities across Midlothian and Scotland, with Gladstone and the speakers often addressing vast crowds from the back of an American-designed Pullman car specially acquired by Rosebery for the purpose. The scenes at these meetings have been described as something between a carnival and an evangelist's revival meeting. While in the grounds of Dalmeny House itself, the public were treated to a great firework display.

Throughout all this, Gladstone was supported not only by Lord Rosebery, but also by many of the women he was familiar with, including Lady Rosebery and Gladstone's daughter Mary, all of whom gathered as much attention as the political speakers, and Rosebery's planning used that to full effect. One meeting, where 70,000 people applied for tickets in a hall capable of holding 6,500, was so packed that many began to faint. Lady Rosebery reported, "I had never heard Archie [Lord Rosebery] speak in public politically before, but after the first minute I felt I could never be nervous at his making a speech the audience show him great affection." It was not just Gladstone and Rosebery that drew in the crowds, it was also their families. Lady Rosebery described how "they [the crowds] patted me on the back till my shoulders were sensitive." During this time of Rosebery's first serious involvement in politics, Disraeli was defeated and the newly elected MP for Midlothian became Prime Minister for the second time (the caretaker liberal leader Lord Hartington retired in favour of Gladstone). Lady Rosebery has been recognized as playing a role in this political electioneering process. As the Marquess of Crewe put it, "she had cut her spurs".

=== Gladstone's second government (1880–1885) ===
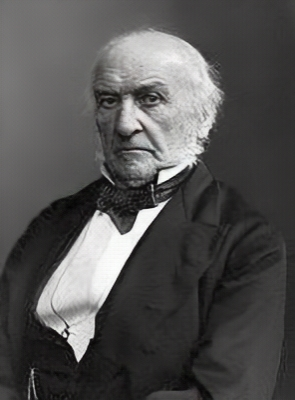
Gladstone was always the nemesis to Hannah Rosebery's ambitions for her husband. Although her money financed the Midlothian campaign, he later said of her: "She would think herself capable of being Queen of the Realm and think the place only just good enough for her."

Her political mettle and ambitions for her husband were however to be more severely tested in Gladstone's second government following the Liberal victory. Rosebery was, as expected, offered a position in Government by Gladstone. It had been rumoured that the position of Viceroy of Ireland or a cabinet place would be proffered, but it turned out to be the job of Under Secretary of the India Office. Rosebery immediately declined the post, giving as his reason that it would appear that he was being repaid for running Gladstone's campaign (as though the Viceregal position would not). When pressed further he cited ill health—he had been suffering from scarlet fever during the Midlothian campaign and now also appeared to be suffering a minor nervous breakdown. Political leaders urged Lady Rosebery to influence him, but she defended his decision, while stressing that his deterioration in health was only temporary. She had to be careful—if it appeared her husband had declined the offer on the grounds that it was too lowly, it would give substance to the claims being made that he was conceited and petulant. Whatever the truth, and it may be Rosebery's own explanation that he "disliked hard work", Lady Rosebery continued to solicit Gladstone for a job for Rosebery within the cabinet. In August 1880, when Gladstone told her firmly that "There is nothing I can give him," she claimed she had not been seeking a cabinet post and Gladstone had misunderstood her. At the same time she was canny enough to mention that Sir William Harcourt and Sir Charles Dilke, both radicals opposed to Gladstone's policies, were "visiting them" and "thoughtful".

Lady Rosebery also began to befriend those politicians such as Lord Northbrook who empathised with her husband, while others such as Lord Granville and Lord Hartington she identified as aloof. She dismissed Lord Spencer with "I can never look on him as a great motive power, besides he does not mention Archie [Rosebery] to me."

Finally her soliciting paid off and in 1881, Rosebery was offered a government position acceptable to him, that of Under Secretary at the Home Office with special responsibility for Scotland. He had sought the position feeling that Scotland was neglected by the Liberal Government who were more interested in Ireland. However, immediately upon assuming the job he began to demand a place in the cabinet. The office he sought was that of Lord Privy Seal, a position Gladstone refused on account of Rosebery's inexperience in Government. It appeared that Rosebery was showing his true colours and he was accused of behaving like a spoilt child, with doubts cast over the honourableness of his reasons for refusing the Under Secretaryship of the India Office.

Lady Rosebery, "conscious of her husband's supreme ability", wanted him in the cabinet and was furiously agitating her husband's discontent until Rosebery threatened to resign his Home Office position. Lady Rosebery had an angry row with Gladstone's wife, where Mrs Gladstone pointed out that if Rosebery resigned he would have nothing but horse racing to interest him, and that Lady Rosebery should be patient as her husband was young. Rosebery, accepting that a cabinet place was not going to be forthcoming, resigned from Government. Lady Rosebery, realising further appeal to the Gladstones was pointless, tried a new avenue—Lord Hartington, the immensely influential Secretary of State for War, who was already quarrelling with Gladstone over the Irish home rule problem, and whom she allegedly met by chance at Preston Railway Station. Inviting him into her carriage for the journey to London, she pleaded her husband's case for three hours to her captive listener.

=== After 1885, and the Dilke Scandal ===
Sir Charles Dilke. Dilke claimed Lady Rosebery had paid his mistress to announce he had enjoyed a three-in-a-bed orgy with her and a maid. The ensuing scandal ruined him.

Gladstone resigned as Prime Minister in 1885 following a Government defeat over the Irish home rule question. The new Tory government was led by Lord Salisbury. However, as a minority administration it was not expected to last, and a swift return of the former administration was anticipated. During this period serious (if unproven) charges of plotting and ruthless ambition were about to be levelled against Lady Rosebery. Sir Charles Dilke, considered as a likely replacement for Gladstone, and thus a rival to Rosebery in government, was implicated in one of the most scandalous and ruinous divorce cases of the era. Involvement in any divorce was social suicide in the 19th century, but the facts which emerged were enough to ensure it was political suicide as well. A friend of the Roseberys, Donald Crawford, MP, sued his wife Virginia for divorce naming Dilke as co-respondent. There was little evidence and Dilke denied the charge, which could have been ultimately forgotten, if Virginia had not suddenly decided to sign a confession giving such lurid details that a great scandal was unavoidable. She claimed that not only had Dilke slept with her and taught her "French vices", but also slept with her mother and partaken in a three-in-a-bed orgy with Virginia and a maid. Dilke denied everything, but his hopes of high political office were ruined forever. Dilke claimed the whole thing was an embroidery of lies and conspiracies by his political enemies. Rumours began to circulate that the Roseberys, and Lady Rosebery in particular, were at the bottom of Dilke's misfortune.

In his futile quest to exonerate himself, and grasping at rumour, Dilke wrote to Rosebery accusing Lady Rosebery of having paid Virginia to make the confession. An outraged Rosebery denied all on his wife's behalf, while in December 1885 Lady Rosebery's only response on being told of Virginia Crawford's confessions was: "Dilke's behaviour is very astonishing in some reports, though it is not an actual surprise to me." Early the following year Gladstone was returned to power and Rosebery was appointed Foreign Secretary in Gladstone's third but brief term of office.

The impartiality demanded by Rosebery's new office forced him to sell many of his business interests, which had come his way through the Rothschild family. However, his wife's ambition and part in his rise to power was not only being recognised in high places, but clearly starting to irritate. On being told that Lady Rosebery was very keen for her husband to become Foreign Secretary, Gladstone replied "She would think herself capable of being Queen of the Realm and think the place only just good enough for her."

== Philanthropy ==
The cypher of Lady Rosebery (as Hannah de Rothschild) which was placed on all the schools and cottages which she had built

Like many other women of her class and era, Lady Rosebery patronised a great number of charities. Upon her inheriting her fortune, one of her first acts was to found a lifeboat station in memory of her father, in 1875, at a cost of £2,000.

Lady Rosebery was also deeply involved with the welfare of young working-class women of the Jewish faith who inhabited the poorer areas of London, in particular Whitechapel. There she founded the Club for Jewish Working Girls. She also donated to numerous other charities connected with Jewish causes. However, within a week of her death her husband began to cancel many of these subscriptions, prompting charges of antisemitism.

Her interest in education has been one of her most obvious surviving charitable legacies. She founded schools in all the villages surrounding the Roseberys' estates. The Mentmore estate alone was serviced by three schools founded by her at Wingrave, Cheddington and Mentmore itself. Not only were the children educated at her expense by trained teachers, each was also provided with seasonal gifts of new clothes. Cheddington School remains in its original building with her cypher on its walls, while Wingrave School, which opened in 1877, survives in new premises.

== Death ==
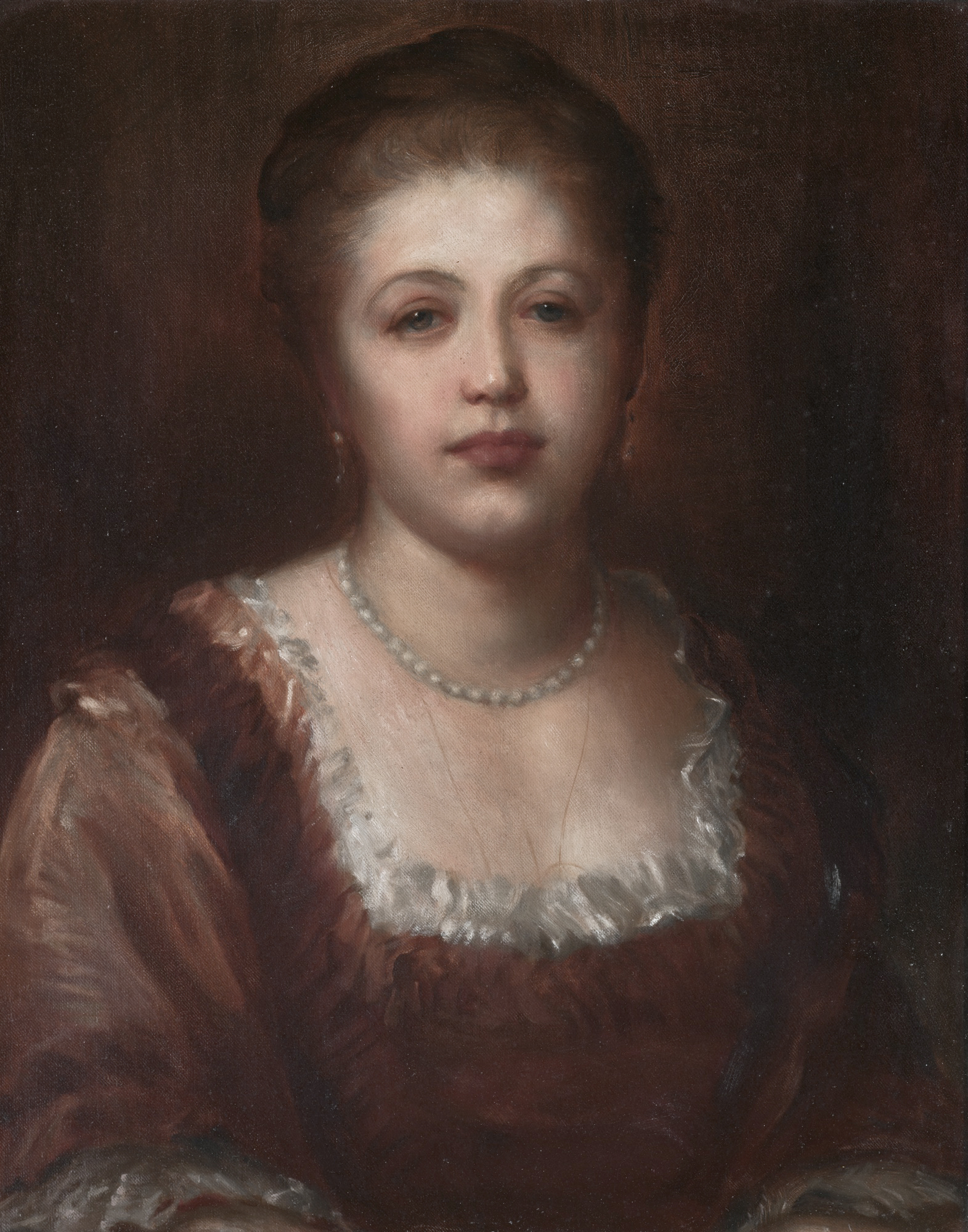
Hannah, Countess of Rosebery by George Frederick Watts. After her death her widower always travelled with this portrait close to him.

Lady Rosebery died of typhoid at Dalmeny in 1890. She was found to also have Bright's disease which had weakened her. It was only after her death that the doctors who had treated her disclosed to Rosebery that her kidney condition would have killed her within two years even if she had not contracted typhoid. She was buried in accordance with the rites of the Jewish faith on 25 November 1890 at Willesden Jewish Cemetery. Rosebery found this particularly hard to bear, and wrote to Queen Victoria of the pain he experienced when "another creed steps in to claim the corpse".

== Legacy ==
=== Rosebery as widower ===
Immediately following his wife's death Rosebery retired from politics, writing in October 1891 "The sole object of my ambition has disappeared with the death of my wife." Proof of the widespread belief in society that Lady Rosebery was the stable element of the partnership was confirmed shortly after her death, by Queen Victoria, following a then rare public speech by Rosebery, in which he supported Home Rule for Ireland. The Queen was shocked and thought the speech "almost communistic" and went on to attribute Rosebery's "shocking and disappointing" behaviour to the fact that "poor Lady Rosebery is not there to keep him back". While Queen Victoria always personally liked Rosebery, she mistrusted his politics.

The Queen had thoroughly liked Lady Rosebery and wrote Rosebery several letters of condolence, likening his loss to the untimely death of her own consort, Prince Albert. It seems that the Queen's antipathy to Jews was confined to elevating them to the peerage. This view had softened by 1885. In 1890 she accepted a luncheon invitation from Lady Rosebery's cousin Ferdinand de Rothschild and toured Waddesdon Manor albeit eating in a separate dining room to the Jewish members of the party.

Shortly after his wife's death, Rosebery left his grieving children and went alone on a tour of Spain. Following a visit to El Escorial he wrote on the sepulchral wonders of the building, but added "for the dead alone the Taj is of course supreme". On his return home he had designed for his wife a Victorian Gothic version of the Taj Mahal in miniature. For the remainder of his life he wore black and used black edged writing paper. Once, when talking with his daughter Sybil, he asked her what mourning she thought her mother would have worn had the situation been reversed. Sybil replied, "She would not have worn any, she would have died at once."

Ronald Munro Ferguson has been quoted in 1912 as saying "many things would have gone otherwise had Lady Rosebery lived. Her loss is today as great a calamity from every point of view as it was at the time of her death."

Widowhood changed Rosebery, both mentally and physically: he aged overnight, and began to refer to himself as an old man. Two years after her death, friends were still concerned that he was suicidal. Winston Churchill thought him maimed by her death, and later said of her "she was a remarkable woman on whom Rosebery leaned, she was ever a pacifying and composing element in his life which he was never able to find again because he could never give full confidence to anyone else."

Sir Edward Hamilton, Rosebery's closest friend, wrote:

..."for the dead alone the Taj is of course supreme." Designs for Lady Rosebery's mausoleum.

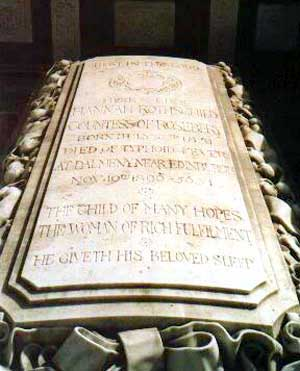
Hannah Rosebery's sarcophagus at Willesden Jewish Cemetery. The tomb’s enclosing mausoleum was destroyed by German bombing in 1941.

Her judgement of a whole was singularly sound and calm; indeed there was a sort of intuitive wisdom about the advice which she would recommend or the consequences of which she would foretell. Hers was a singularly well balanced mind; her shrewdness and foresight were most certainly to lead others as well as herself to form right conclusions. Having the power of seeing through people quickly, she gauged the characters of her fellow creatures with great perspicacity and she thus knew whom to trust and of whom to beware. She had a high sense of duty and would never allow pleasure to interfere with duty.

Before their marriage and his full-time entry into politics, Rosebery's future wife had written with extraordinary foresight and ambition to him: "I work only to help you, if you are Prime Minister, let me imitate Montagu Corry."

=== Later life of children ===
Lady Rosebery's eldest son, Harry, who was less successful in politics than his father and brother, distinguished himself by becoming captain of Surrey County Cricket Club and owning two Epsom Derby-winning horses. He succeeded his father as 6th Earl of Rosebery and died in 1974. Margaret married her father's old friend and biographer the Marquess of Crewe. Such was still the fame of her parents that London traffic was brought to a standstill on her wedding day in 1899. Lady Crewe became one of the first women magistrates in Britain; she died in 1955. Lady Sybil has been summarised by one of her father's biographers: "Even more eccentric than her father, she spent much of her time living in a caravan." Neil, the second of the Roseberys' sons, entered politics but joined the army on the outbreak of World War I and was killed leading a charge at Gezer in 1917.

=== Property ===
Of Hannah Rosebery's homes, the lease on Lansdowne House was surrendered shortly before her death, when the Roseberys purchased 38 Berkeley Square. This property was transformed into one of London's most luxurious town houses. However, Lady Rosebery did not live to see the work completed. Her son Harry sold the house in 1938, and it was demolished. A year later a bomb landed on the empty site during World War II. The Durdans was bequeathed to her daughter, Sybil, in 1929 and was sold together with its contents in 1955. Lord and Lady Rosebery's library there was given to the nation at this time. Mentmore, the grandest of the Roseberys' homes, was sold by Lady Rosebery's grandson, the 7th Earl of Rosebery, in 1977, together with the Rothschild art collection, which Lady Rosebery had not only been intensely interested in but had enlarged considerably. She personally catalogued the collection, and prophetically wrote in the preface "In time to come, when, like all collections, this will be dispersed (and I hope this will be long after my death) this book may be of value."

Her two-volume work and the collection it described remained so unknown that "Save Mentmore" (a group attempting to halt the sale of Mentmore to keep the collection within Britain) failed largely due to widespread public ignorance of both house and collection. A few pieces of furniture and paintings were taken to Dalmeny, (the only house to remain in the family) where they are displayed today, and three pictures including Drouais's Madame de Pompadour were purchased for the National Gallery. The remainder of the collection was dispersed in a week-long sale and is now scattered across the globe. A further sale of the "Continental Library," to which she had added, was conducted in 1995 at the Aeolian Hall, London, by Sotheby's.

=== Town named after Hannah Primrose in Israel ===
Pardes Hanna (Hebrew: Hannah's [Citrus] Orchard), a local council founded in 1929 on the Sharon plain in Israel, was named after Hannah Primrose, Countess of Rosebery.

=== In literature ===
Her qualities were portrayed in literature when Lady Rosebery was reputed to be the model for Marcella Maxwell in Mrs Humphry Ward's novel Sir George Tressady (1909). The author lived at Stocks close to Lady Rosebery's home at Mentmore.
