= Duchess of Cleveland =

Duchess of Cleveland may refer to:

- Barbara Palmer, 1st Duchess of Cleveland (1640–1709), mistress of King Charles II of England
- Wilhelmina Powlett, Duchess of Cleveland, (Catherine Lucy Wilhelmina Powlett, née Stanhope, 1819–1901), English historian and genealogist
