= Beke (surname) =

Beke is a surname. Notable people with the surname include:

- Anton Beke (born 1966), British ballroom dancer
- Charles Tilstone Beke (1800–1874), English explorer
- Emanuel Beke (1862–1946), Beke Manó, Hungarian mathematician
- John Beke, 1st Baron Beke (d.1303/4), a baron
- Péter Beke (footballer, born 1994), Hungarian football player
- Péter Beke (footballer, born 2001), Hungarian football player
- Richard Beke (1630–1707), English politician
- Rutger Beke (born 1977), Belgian triathlete
- Walter Beke (fl.12th century), Anglo-Flemish landholder
- Wouter Beke (born 1974), Belgian politician
- Zoltán Beke (1911–1994), Romanian footballer
