= Betke =

Betke is a surname. Notable people with the surname include:

- Bernard Betke (1891–1975), American sport shooter
- Siegfried Betke (1917–1988), German Luftwaffe bomber pilot
- Stefan Betke (born 1967), German electronic music artist, see Pole (musician)

== See also ==
- Beke (surname)
- Betker
