= Archibald Primrose, 5th Earl of Rosebery =

Prime Minister of the United Kingdom from 1894 to 1895

The Right Honourable The Earl of Rosebery KG KT PC FRS FBA
- Lord Rosebery, c. 1892-1896

Prime Minister of the United Kingdom
- In office 5 March 1894 – 22 June 1895
- Monarch: Victoria
- Preceded by: William Ewart Gladstone
- Succeeded by: The Marquess of Salisbury

Leader of the Opposition
- In office 22 June 1895 – 6 October 1896
- Prime Minister: The Marquess of Salisbury
- Preceded by: The Marquess of Salisbury
- Succeeded by: Sir William Harcourt
Ministerial offices
Lord President of the Council
In office 10 March 1894 – 21 June 1895
Prime Minister	Himself
Preceded by	The Earl of Kimberley
Succeeded by	The Duke of Devonshire
Secretary of State for Foreign Affairs
In office 18 August 1892 – 10 March 1894
Prime Minister	William Ewart Gladstone
Preceded by	The Marquess of Salisbury
Succeeded by	The Earl of Kimberley
In office 6 February 1886 – 3 August 1886
Prime Minister	William Ewart Gladstone
Preceded by	The Marquess of Salisbury
Succeeded by	The Earl of Iddesleigh
Lord Keeper of the Privy Seal
In office 5 March 1885 – 9 June 1885
Prime Minister	William Ewart Gladstone
Preceded by	The Lord Carlingford
Succeeded by	The Earl of Harrowby
First Commissioner of Works
In office 13 February 1885 – 9 June 1885
Prime Minister	William Ewart Gladstone
Preceded by	George Shaw-Lefevre
Succeeded by	David Plunket
Parliamentary Under-Secretary of State for the Home Department
In office August 1881 – June 1883
Prime Minister	William Ewart Gladstone
Preceded by	Leonard Courtney
Succeeded by	J. T. Hibbert

Member of the House of Lords
- Lord Temporal
- Hereditary peerage 7 May 1868 – 21 May 1929
- Preceded by: The 4th Earl of Rosebery
- Succeeded by: The 6th Earl of Rosebery

Personal details
- Born: 7 May 1847 Mayfair, Middlesex, England
- Died: 21 May 1929 (aged 82) Epsom, Surrey, England
- Resting place: Dalmeny Parish Church, Edinburgh, Scotland
- Party: Liberal
- Spouse: Hannah de Rothschild (m. 1878; died 1890)
- Children: Sybil; Peggy; Harry; Neil
- Parents: Archibald Primrose, Lord Dalmeny; Wilhelmina Powlett, Duchess of Cleveland
- Education: Christ Church, Oxford

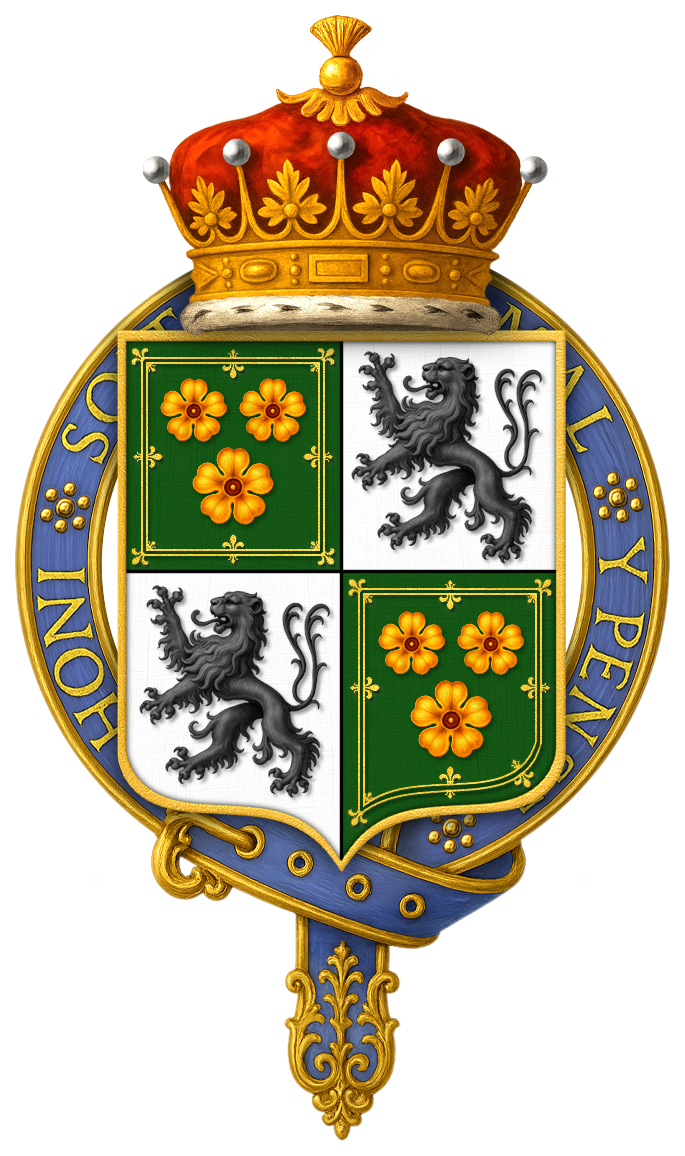
Quartered arms of Archibald Primrose, 5th Earl of Rosebery, KG, KT, PC, FRS, FBA

Archibald Philip Primrose, 5th Earl of Rosebery, 1st Earl of Midlothian (7 May 1847 – 21 May 1929), was a British Liberal Party politician who served as Prime Minister of the United Kingdom from March 1894 to June 1895. Between the death of his father in 1851, and the death of his grandfather, the 4th Earl of Rosebery, in 1868, he was known by the courtesy title of Lord Dalmeny.

Rosebery first came to national attention in 1879 by sponsoring the successful Midlothian campaign of William Ewart Gladstone. His most successful performance in office came as chairman of the London County Council in 1889. He entered the Cabinet in 1885 and was twice Foreign Secretary, paying special attention to French and German affairs. He succeeded Gladstone as prime minister and leader of the Liberal Party in 1894; the Liberals lost the 1895 election. He resigned the party leadership in 1896 and never again held political office.

Rosebery was widely known as a brilliant orator, an outstanding sportsman and marksman, a writer and historian, connoisseur and collector. All of these activities attracted him more than politics, which became for him both boring and unattractive. He drifted to the right of the Liberal Party and became a bitter critic of its policies. Winston Churchill, observing that he never adapted to democratic electoral competition, quipped: "He would not stoop; he did not conquer."

Rosebery was a Liberal Imperialist who favoured strong national defence and imperialism abroad and social reform at home, while being solidly anti-socialist. Historians judge him a failure as foreign minister and as prime minister.

== Origins and early life ==
Archibald Philip Primrose was born on 7 May 1847 in his parents' house in Charles Street, Mayfair, London. His father was Archibald Primrose, Lord Dalmeny (1809–1851), son and heir apparent to Archibald Primrose, 4th Earl of Rosebery (1783–1868), whom he predeceased. Lord Dalmeny was a courtesy title used by the Earl's eldest son and heir apparent, during the Earl's lifetime, and was one of the Earl's lesser Scottish titles. Lord Dalmeny was MP for Stirling from 1832 to 1847 and served as Civil Lord of the Admiralty under Lord Melbourne.

Rosebery's mother was Lady (Catherine Lucy) Wilhelmina Stanhope (1819–1901), a historian who later wrote under her second married name "the Duchess of Cleveland", a daughter of Philip Stanhope, 4th Earl Stanhope. Lord Dalmeny died on 23 January 1851, having predeceased his father, when the courtesy title passed to his son, the future Rosebery, as the new heir to the earldom. In 1854 his mother remarried to Lord Harry Vane (later after 1864 known as Harry Powlett, 4th Duke of Cleveland). The relationship between mother and son was very poor. His elder and favourite sister Constance was the wife of Henry Wyndham, 2nd Baron Leconfield.

== Education and youth ==
Dalmeny attended Bayford House school in Hertfordshire, a school in Brighton run by Mr Lee, and then Eton College (1860–65). At Eton, he formed a close attachment to his tutor William Johnson Cory: they visited Rome together in 1864, and maintained correspondence for years afterwards. Dalmeny proceeded to Christ Church, Oxford, matriculating in January 1866. During his time at Oxford he was a member of the Bullingdon Club. He left Oxford in 1868: Dalmeny bought a horse named Ladas, although a rule banned undergraduates from owning horses. When he was found out, he was offered a choice: to sell the horse or to give up his studies. He chose the latter, and subsequently was a prominent figure in British horseracing for 40 years.

The three Prime Ministers from 1880 to 1902, namely Gladstone, Salisbury and Rosebery, all attended both Eton and Christ Church. Rosebery toured the United States in 1873, 1874 and 1876. He was pressed to marry Marie Fox, the sixteen-year-old adopted daughter of Henry Fox, 4th Baron Holland. She declined him because she was unwilling to renounce Roman Catholicism.

== Succession to earldom ==
When his grandfather died in 1868, Dalmeny became 5th Earl of Rosebery. Rosebery inherited his title at age 21, together with an income of £30,000 a year (equivalent to £2.93 million in present-day terms). He owned 40,000 acres (160 km^{2}) in Scotland, and land in Norfolk, Hertfordshire, and Kent.

== Career ==
Rosebery is reputed to have said that he had three aims in life: to win the Derby, to marry an heiress, and to become Prime Minister. He managed all three.

=== Early political career ===
As part of the Liberal plan to get William Ewart Gladstone to be MP for Midlothian, Rosebery sponsored and largely ran the Midlothian Campaign of 1879. He based this on what he had observed in elections in the United States. Gladstone spoke from open-deck trains, and gathered mass support. In 1880, he was duly elected Member for Midlothian and returned to the premiership.

Rosebery served as Foreign Secretary in Gladstone's brief third ministry in 1886. He served as the first chairman of the London County Council, set up by the Conservatives in 1889. Rosebery Avenue in Clerkenwell is named after him. He served as President of the first day of the 1890 Co-operative Congress.

In 1892 he was appointed a Knight Companion of the Order of the Garter. Rosebery's second period as Foreign Secretary, 1892–1894, predominantly involved quarrels with France over Uganda. To quote his hero Napoleon, Rosebery thought that "the Master of Egypt is the Master of India"; thus he pursued the policy of expansion in Africa. He helped Gladstone's Second Home Rule Bill in the House of Lords; nevertheless it was defeated overwhelmingly in the autumn of 1893. The first bill had been defeated in the House of Commons in 1886.

=== Prime Minister ===
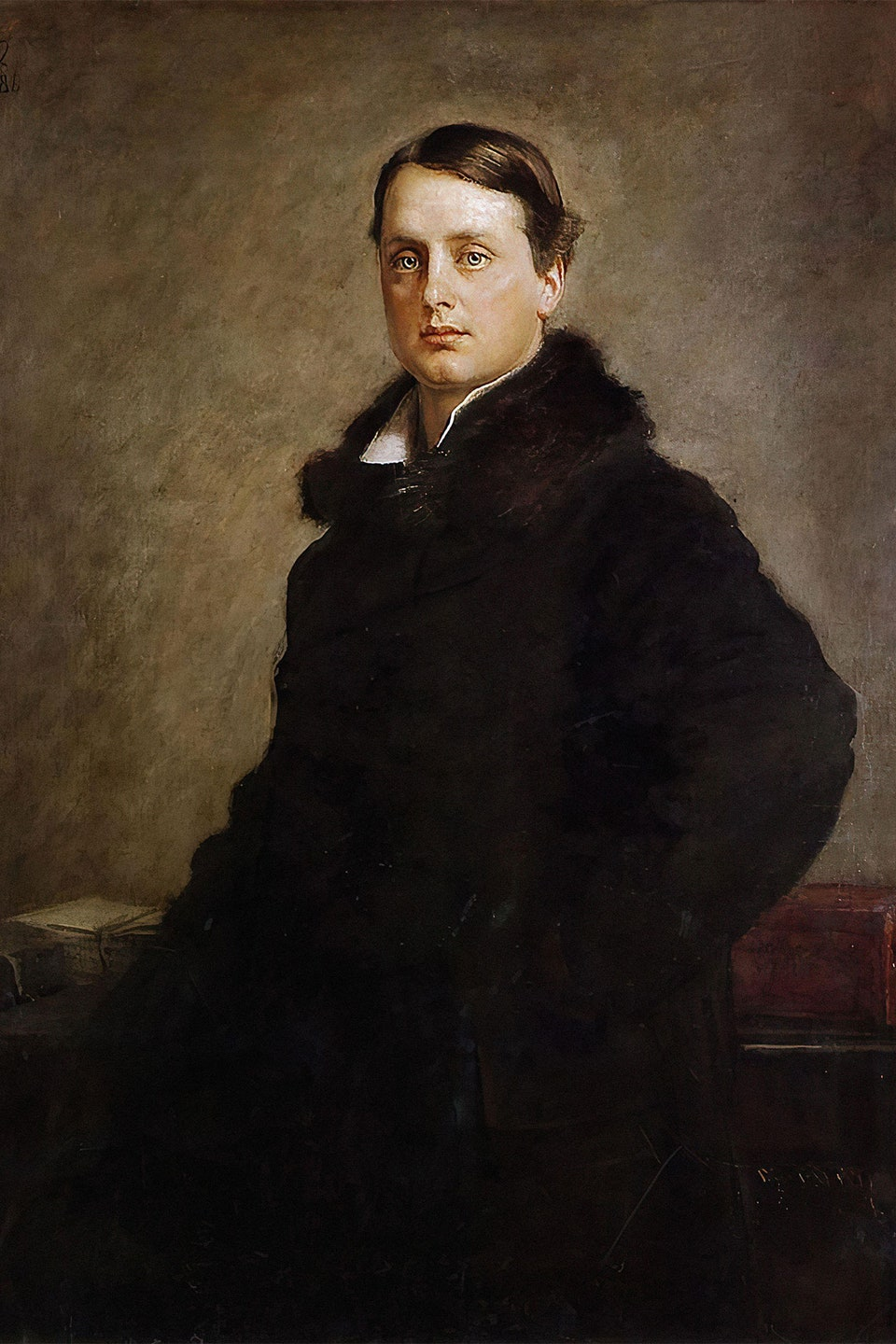
Archibald Philip Primrose, 5th Earl of Rosebery, portrait by John Everett Millais, 1886.

Rosebery became a leader of the Liberal Imperialist faction of the Liberal Party and when Gladstone retired, in 1894, Rosebery succeeded him as Prime Minister, much to the disgust of Sir William Harcourt, the Chancellor of the Exchequer and leader of the more left-wing Liberals. Rosebery's selection was largely because Queen Victoria disliked most of the other leading Liberals. Rosebery was in the House of Lords, but Harcourt controlled the House of Commons, where he often undercut the prime minister.

Rosebery's government was largely unsuccessful, as in the Armenian crisis of 1895–96. He spoke out for a strongly pro-Armenian and anti-Turkish policy. Gladstone, a prime minister in retirement, called on Britain to intervene alone. The added pressure weakened Rosebery.

His designs in foreign policy, such as an expansion of the fleet, were defeated by disagreements within the Liberal Party. He angered all the European powers.

The Unionist-dominated House of Lords stopped the whole of the Liberals' domestic legislation. The strongest figure in the cabinet was Rosebery's rival, Harcourt. He and his son Lewis were perennial critics of Rosebery's policies. There were two future prime ministers in the Cabinet, Home Secretary H. H. Asquith, and Secretary of State for War Henry Campbell-Bannerman. Rosebery rapidly lost interest in running the government. In the last year of his premiership, he was increasingly haggard: he suffered insomnia due to the continual dissension in his Cabinet.

On 21 June 1895, the government lost a vote in committee on army supply by just seven votes. While this might have been treated merely as a vote of no confidence in Secretary for War Campbell-Bannerman, Rosebery chose to treat it as a vote of censure on his government. On 22 June, he and his ministers tendered their resignations to the Queen, who invited the Unionist leader, Lord Salisbury, to form a government. The following month, the Unionists won a crushing victory in the 1895 general election, and held power for ten years (1895–1905) under Salisbury and Arthur Balfour. Rosebery remained the Liberal leader for another year, then permanently retired from politics.

==== Lord Rosebery's government, March 1894 – June 1895 ====
- Lord Rosebery – First Lord of the Treasury, Lord President of the Council, and Leader of the House of Lords
- Lord Herschell – Lord Chancellor
- Lord Tweedmouth – Lord Privy Seal
- H. H. Asquith – Secretary of State for the Home Department
- Lord Kimberley – Secretary of State for Foreign Affairs
- Lord Ripon – Secretary of State for the Colonies
- Sir Henry Campbell-Bannerman – Secretary of State for War
- Sir Henry Hartley Fowler – Secretary of State for India
- Sir William Harcourt – Chancellor of the Exchequer and Leader of the House of Commons
- Lord Spencer – First Lord of the Admiralty
- Anthony John Mundella – President of the Board of Trade
- Arnold Morley – Postmaster-General
- George John Shaw-Lefevre – President of the Local Government Board
- James Bryce – Chancellor of the Duchy of Lancaster
- John Morley – Chief Secretary for Ireland
- Sir George Otto Trevelyan – Secretary for Scotland
- Sir Arthur Herbert Dyke Acland – Vice-President of the Council

=== Later life ===
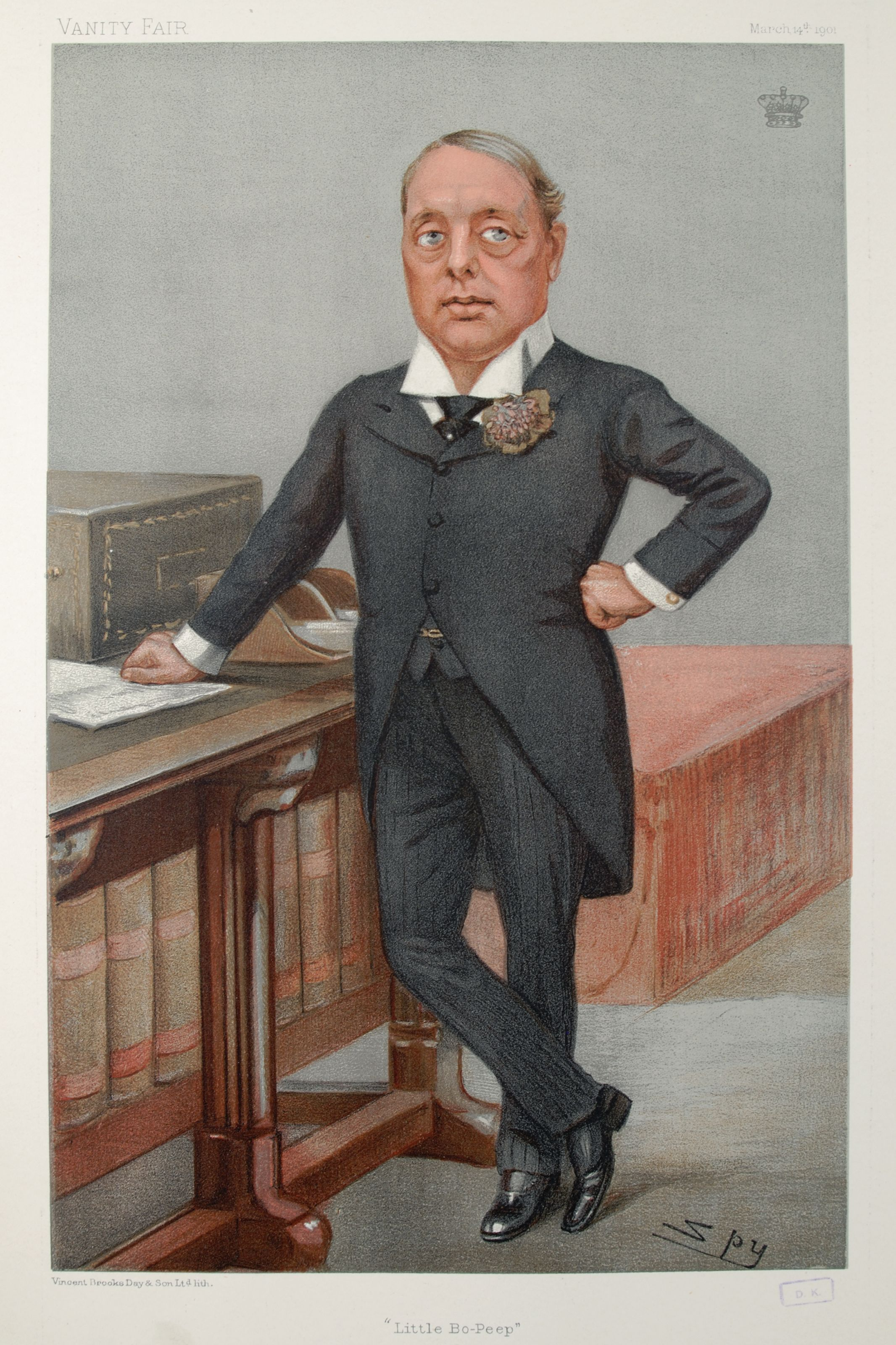
Rosebery caricatured by Spy for Vanity Fair, 1901

==== Liberal Imperialists ====
Rosebery resigned as leader of the Liberal Party on 6 October 1896, to be succeeded by William Harcourt and gradually moved further and further from the mainstream of the party. With the Liberals in opposition divided over the Boer War which started in 1899, Rosebery, although officially politically inactive, emerged as the head of the "Liberal Imperialists" faction of the party, opposed to Irish Home rule. He supported the war, and brought along many nonconformists likewise. However the war was opposed by a younger faction of Liberals, including David Lloyd George and the party leader Sir Henry Campbell-Bannerman.

Rosebery's acolytes, including H. H. Asquith and Edward Grey, regularly implored him to return as party leader and even Campbell-Bannerman said he would serve under Rosebery, if he accepted fundamental Liberal party doctrine. In a much trailed speech to the Chesterfield Liberal Association in December 1901, Rosebery was widely expected to announce his return but instead delivered what Harcourt's son and private secretary Lewis described as "an insult to the whole past of the Liberal party", by telling the party to "clean its slate". In 1902 Rosebery was installed as president of the newly formed "Liberal League" which superseded the Liberal Imperialist League and counted amongst its vice presidents Asquith and Grey.

He was Honorary Colonel of the 1st Midlothian Artillery Volunteers from January 1903 until his death in 1929.

==== 1905 onwards ====
Rosebery's positions made it impossible to join the Liberal government that returned to power in 1905. Rosebery turned to writing, including biographies of Lord Chatham, Pitt the Younger, Napoleon, and Lord Randolph Churchill. Another one of his passionate interests was the collecting of rare books.

The last years of his political life saw Rosebery become a purely negative critic of the Liberal governments of Campbell-Bannerman and Asquith. His crusade "for freedom as against bureaucracy, for freedom as against democratic tyranny, for freedom as against class legislation, and ... for freedom as against Socialism" was a lonely one, conducted from the crossbenches in the Lords. He joined the die-hard unionist peers in attacking Lloyd George's redistributive People's Budget in 1909 but stopped short of voting against the measure for fear of bringing retribution upon the Lords. The crisis provoked by the Lords' rejection of the budget encouraged him to reintroduce his resolutions for Lords reform, but they were lost with the dissolution of parliament in December 1910.

After assaulting the "ill-judged, revolutionary and partisan" terms of the 1911 Parliament Bill, which proposed to curb the Lords' veto, he voted with the government in what proved to be his last appearance in the House of Lords. This was effectively the end of his public life, though he made several public appearances to support the First World War effort after 1914 and sponsored a "bantam battalion" in 1915. Though Lloyd George offered him "a high post not involving departmental labour" to augment his 1916 coalition, Rosebery declined to serve.

== Personal life ==
=== Marriage ===
Hannah de Rothschild, portrait by Frederic Leighton, 1st Baron Leighton

On 20 March 1878, 31-year-old Rosebery married 27-year-old Hannah de Rothschild (1851–1890), only child and sole heiress of the Jewish banker Mayer Amschel de Rothschild, and the wealthiest British heiress of her day. Her father had died four years previously in 1874, and bequeathed to her the bulk of his estate. The wedding was held (registered) at the office of the Board of Guardians in Mount Street, London. Later the same day, the marriage was blessed at a Christian ceremony in Christ Church, Down Street, Piccadilly. The Prince of Wales and the Queen's cousin, the army commander Prince George, Duke of Cambridge, were among the guests who attended the ceremony.

By his wife, Rosebery had two sons and two daughters:

- Albert Edward Harry Meyer Archibald Primrose, 6th Earl of Rosebery known as Harry (8 January 1882 – 30 May 1974), who married Lady Dorothy Grosvenor (granddaughter of Hugh Lupus Grosvenor, 1st Duke of Westminster through his third son Lord Henry Grosvenor) on 15 April 1909 and was divorced from her in 1919. They had two children. He married Hon. Eva Isabel Bruce (daughter of Henry Campbell Bruce, 2nd Baron Aberdare) on 24 June 1924. They had two children.
- Neil James Archibald Primrose (14 December 1882 – 18 November 1917), who married Lady Victoria Stanley (daughter of Edward Stanley, 17th Earl of Derby) on 7 April 1915. They had one daughter: Ruth Wood, Countess of Halifax.
- Lady Sybil Primrose (18 September 1879 – 25 February 1955), who married General Sir Charles Grant on 28 March 1903. They had one son.
- Lady Margaret "Peggy" Etrenne Hannah Primrose (1 January 1881 – 13 March 1967), who married Robert Crewe-Milnes, 1st Marquess of Crewe on 20 April 1899. They had a son, who died in childhood, and a daughter: Mary Innes-Ker, Duchess of Roxburghe. As Lady Crewe, she became one of the first seven women appointed as magistrates in 1919 following the passing of the Sex Disqualification (Removal) Act 1919.

More than a decade after his wife's death, in July 1901, it was speculated that Rosebery intended to marry the widowed Princess Helena, Duchess of Albany, widow of Prince Leopold, Duke of Albany, youngest son of Queen Victoria. Princess Helena was also the sister of Queen Emma of the Netherlands. However, Rosebery never remarried.

=== Sexuality ===
Throughout his life, it was rumoured that Rosebery was homosexual or bisexual. He was a notorious misogynist, and liked to surround himself with younger men.

As a student at Eton, beyond his close relationship with his tutor, William Johnson Cory, he likely had feelings for at least one fellow student, Frederick Vyner. He was devastated by Vyner's murder at the hands of Greek brigands in 1870, keeping the anniversary sacred for the rest of his life.

Like Oscar Wilde, he was hounded by John Douglas, 9th Marquess of Queensberry for his association with Francis Douglas, Viscount Drumlanrig, Queensberry's first born son – who had become his private secretary in 1892 when Rosebery became Foreign Secretary. A few months later he arranged for Drumlanrig, who was 26 at the time, to be made a junior member of the government with a seat in the House of Lords.

During the preliminary hearing of the case against Wilde, a letter from Queensberry was produced referring to him as 'a damned cur and coward of the Rosebery type'.

On 18 October 1894, sixteen months after his ennoblement, Drumlanrig died from injuries received during a shooting party. The inquest returned a verdict of "accidental death", but his death was rumoured potentially to be suicide or murder. It was speculated at the time that Drumlanrig may have had a romantic, if not sexual, relationship with Rosebery.

The suggestion was that Queensberry had threatened to expose the Prime Minister if his government did not vigorously prosecute Wilde for the latter's relationship with Drumlanrig's younger brother, Lord Alfred Douglas. Queensberry believed, as he put it in a letter, that "Snob Queers like Rosebery" had corrupted his sons, and he held Rosebery indirectly responsible for Drumlanrig's death. He claimed to have evidence of Rosebery's transgressions but that was never confirmed.

Using a minor defeat in Parliament that did not warrant such action, Rosebery resigned from the Premiership on 22 June 1895. This was a few months after the death of Drumlanrig and not quite a month after Wilde was convicted on 25 May, his life and reputation destroyed by a man who was also pursuing Rosebery for the same reason he was after Wilde. In August 1893, Queensberry had followed Rosebery to the spa town of Bad Homburg with the declared intention of giving him a horse-whipping, and had to be dissuaded by the Prince of Wales who was also staying there.

In his recollections, Rosebery wrote: "I cannot forget 1895. To lie awake night after night, wide awake, hopeless of sleep, tormented of nerves, and to realise all that was going on, at which I was present, so to speak, like a disembodied spirit, to watch one's own corpse, as it were day after day, is an experience which no sane man would repeat."

Sir Edmund Backhouse wrote in his unpublished memoirs that he had been one of Rosebery's lovers – although it has been suggested that many of Backhouse's claims were dubiously made.

Robert Rhodes James, who wrote a biography of Rosebery in 1963 (when homosexuality was still illegal in Britain), makes no mention of homosexual relationships at all, while for Leo McKinstry, who was writing in 2005, the evidence that Rosebery was homosexual is circumstantial. Michael Bloch, in 2015, has, however, no doubt that Rosebery was at least romantically interested in men, making him one of the four figures presented in the first chapter of his book on homosexual and bisexual British politicians of the 20th century. In his view, any remaining evidence (of which he gives a long list) can only be circumstantial in any case, considering Rosebery's paranoid taste for secrecy.

== Death and burial ==
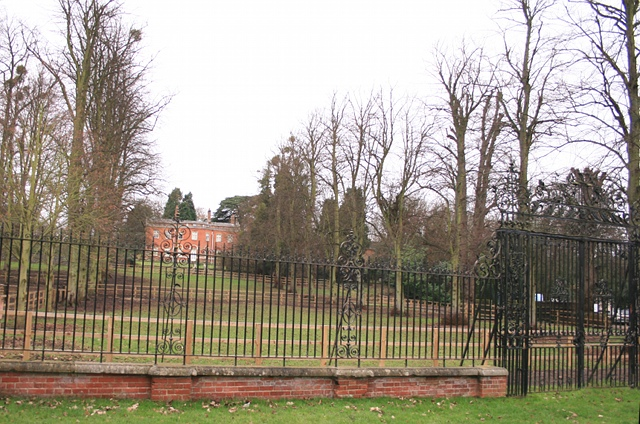
Durdans, Woodcote End, Epsom, Surrey, England was the place of Rosebery's demise in 1929, shown in 2011. Its gardens are smaller than when engraved by John Hassell in 1816.

The last year of the First World War was clouded by two personal tragedies: his son Neil's death in Palestine in November 1917 and Rosebery's own stroke a few days before the armistice. He regained his mental powers, but his movement, hearing, and sight remained impaired for the rest of his life. His sister Constance described his last years as a "life of weariness, of total inactivity, and at the last of almost blindness". John Buchan remembered him in his last month of life, "crushed by bodily weakness" and "sunk in sad and silent meditations". Rosebery died in Epsom, Surrey on 21 May 1929.

== Sporting interests ==
Rosebery became Honorary President of the national Scottish Football Association, with the representative Scotland national team and Honorary President of Heart of Midlothian. The national team occasionally forsook their traditional dark blue shirts for his traditional racing colours of primrose and pink. This occurred nine times during Rosebery's lifetime, most notably for the 1900 British Home Championship match against England, which the Scots won 4–1. These colours were used for the away kit of the Scotland national team in 2014.

== Literary interests ==
He was a keen collector of fine books and amassed an excellent library. It was sold on 29 October 2009 at Sotheby's, New Bond Street. Rosebery unveiled the statue of Robert Burns in Dumfries on 6 April 1882. At the unveiling of the statue of Oliver Cromwell in Westminster on 31 October 1899, Rosebery made a speech on Cromwell: he was later revealed as the anonymous donor who paid for the statue.

== Landholdings ==
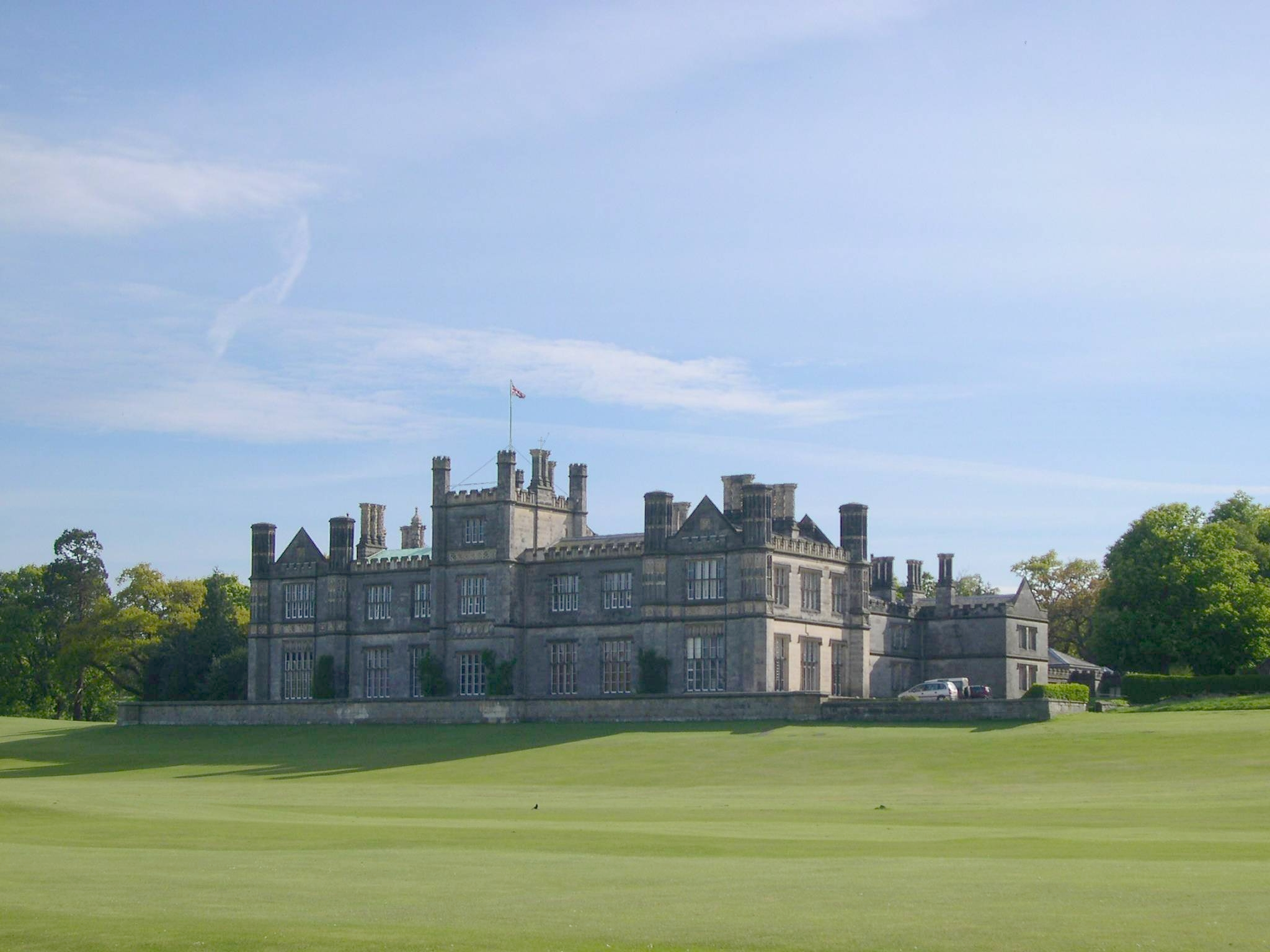
Dalmeny House was the ancestral seat of the Earls of Rosebery and the setting for Lord and Lady Rosebery's political houseparties.

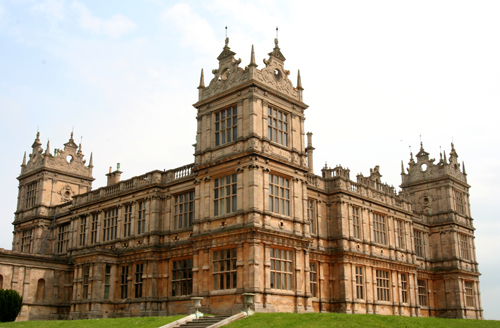
Mentmore Towers

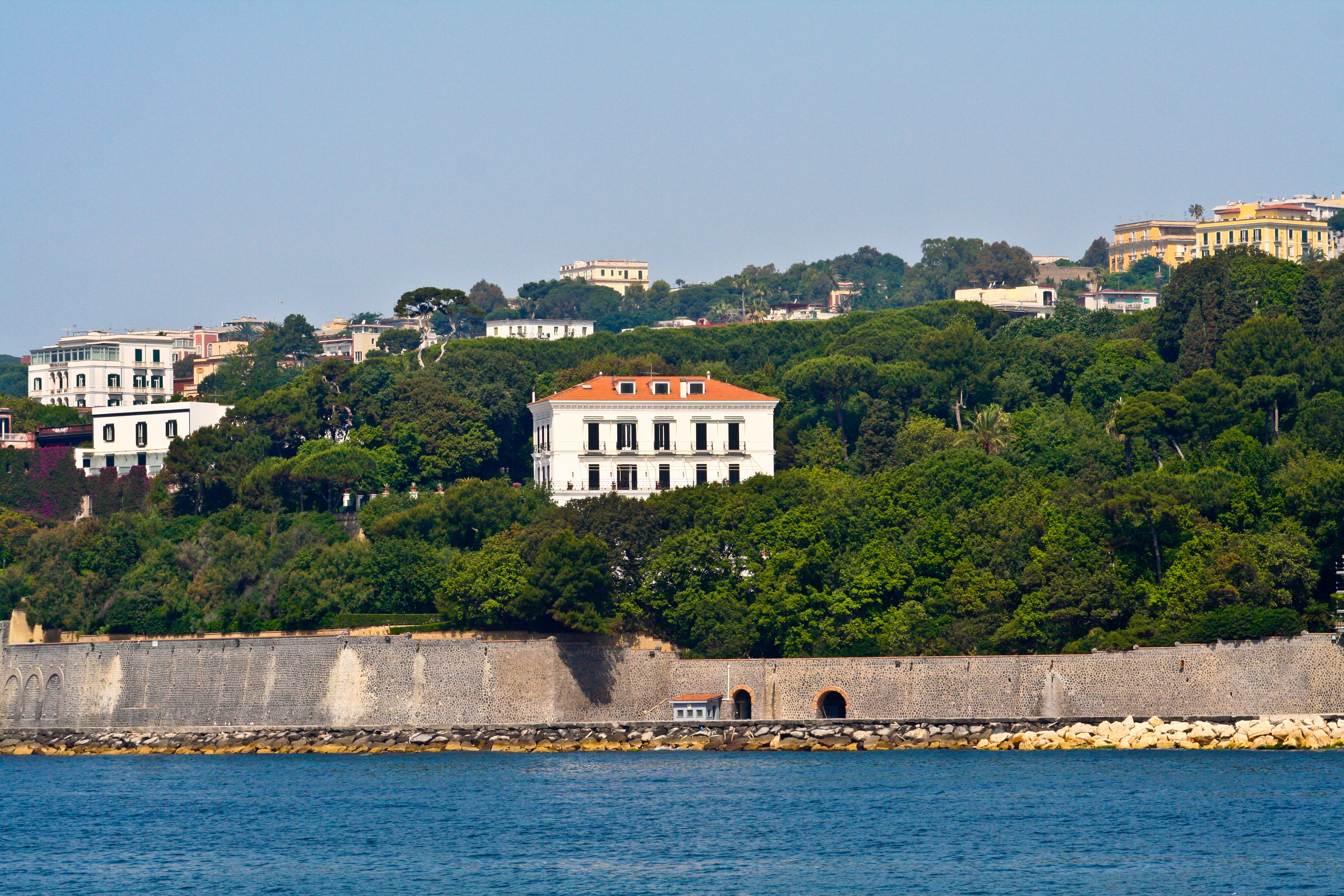
Villa Delahente now Villa Rosebery

Rosebery was the owner of twelve houses. By marriage, he acquired:

- Mentmore Towers in Buckinghamshire, a huge neo-Renaissance stately home, sold in the 1970s
- Number 40, Piccadilly, in London.

With his fortune, he bought:

- Malleny House and Garden in 1882
- a shooting lodge at Carrington in Midlothian
- a Georgian villa at Postwick in Norfolk
- In 1897, he bought Villa Delahente in Posillipo, overlooking the Bay of Naples, currently an official residence of the President of the Italian Republic, still known as Villa Rosebery
- 38 Berkeley Square, London
- The Durdans, Epsom, where he died in 1929.

As Earl of Rosebery, he was laird of:

- Dalmeny House on the banks of the Firth of Forth (pictured)
- Barnbougle Castle in the grounds of Dalmeny Estate, used by Rosebery (an insomniac) for privacy.

He rented:

- a home in Randolph Crescent, Edinburgh, during World War I
- Lansdowne House, in London, from the Marquess of Lansdowne.

== Legacy and evaluations ==
Rosebery's position in British politics was puzzling to contemporaries and historians due to the enigmatic nature of his private and public lives. He had an air of privileged detachment, which persisted throughout his brief stint in the political limelight and his significant years in the background. Although he was an orator and statesman in the mold of his original leader, Gladstone, his fifteen-month term as Liberal Prime Minister in 1894-5 was an unhappy spectacle. Lord Rosebery's failure to live up to his potential disappointed Liberals of all kinds. Journalists and biographers have criticized his lack of character and sense of failure, possibly influenced by his Scottish Calvinist upbringing. Despite his love for luxury and pleasure, his motives for leaving and returning to politics may not have been solely self-indulgent. He was known for his passion for racehorses, even ending his studies at Oxford to pursue them.

=== Place-name tributes ===
The Oatlands area in the South Side of Glasgow was laid out in the late 19th and early 20th centuries, contemporary with Rosebery's most prominent period. The area is much changed since it was originally laid out, but several of the original street names had an association with him or areas around his estate to the northwest of Edinburgh: Rosebery Street, Dalmeny Street, Queensferry Street, Granton Street and Cramond Street.

In London, Rosebery Avenue, running between Holborn and Clerkenwell, was named after him, in recognition of his service as the London County Council's first chairman. In the English city of Norwich, the Lord Rosebery public house and Rosebery Road Methodist Church are both located on Rosebery Road.

Rosebery, New South Wales, a suburb of Sydney, is named after him. A major street, Dalmeny Avenue, runs through the area. Rosebery, Tasmania is also named after him, via the name of a mining company. Dalmeny, New South Wales, a suburb on the New South Wales South Coast, is named after him. Roseberry Avenue in the suburb of South Perth, Western Australia, is also named after him. The former township of Rosebery in South Australia (now part of Collinswood) was named for him, as was modern-day Rosebery Lane in Collinswood.

== Ancestry ==
Ancestors of Archibald Primrose, 5th Earl of Rosebery

8. Rt. Hon. Neil Primrose, 3rd Earl of Rosebery
4. Rt. Hon. Archibald John Primrose, 4th Earl of Rosebery
9. Mary Vincent
2. Archibald Primrose, Lord Dalmeny
10. Hon. Bartholomew Bouverie
5. Harriet Bouverie
11. Mary Wyndham Arundell
1. Rt. Hon. Archibald Philip Primrose, 5th Earl of Rosebery
12. Rt. Hon. Charles Stanhope, 3rd Earl Stanhope
6. Rt. Hon. Philip Henry Stanhope, 4th Earl Stanhope
13. Louisa Grenville
3. Lady Catherine Lucy Wilhelmina Stanhope
14. Rt. Hon. Robert Smith, 1st Baron Carrington
7. Hon. Catherine Lucy Smith
15. Anne Barnard

== Arms ==
Coat of arms of Archibald Primrose, 5th Earl of Rosebery
Crest A demi-lion gules holding in the dexter paw a primrose or. Escutcheon Quarterly: 1st and 4th, vert, three primroses within a double tressure flory counterflory or (Primrose); 2nd and 3rd, Argent, a lion rampant, double queued sable (Cressy). Supporters Two lions or. Motto Fide et fiducia (By fidelity and confidence). Orders The Most Noble Order of the Garter (Knight Companion).

== Works ==
- Lord Chatham
- Lord Randolph Churchill
- Napoleon: The Last Phase
- Pitt (about William Pitt the Younger)

== See also ==
- Lady Stair's House

Political offices
Preceded by Leonard Courtney	Under-Secretary of State for the Home Department; 1881–1883	Succeeded by John Tomlinson Hibbert
Preceded by George Shaw-Lefevre	First Commissioner of Works; 1885	Succeeded by David Plunket
Preceded by The Lord Carlingford	Lord Privy Seal; 1885	Succeeded by The Earl of Harrowby
Preceded by The Marquess of Salisbury	Foreign Secretary; 1886	Succeeded by The Earl of Iddesleigh
New office	Chairman of the London County Council; 1889–1890	Succeeded by Sir John Lubbock, Bt
Preceded by Sir John Lubbock, Bt	Chairman of the London County Council; 1892	Succeeded by John Hutton
Preceded by The Marquess of Salisbury	Foreign Secretary; 1892–1894	Succeeded by The Earl of Kimberley
Preceded by William Ewart Gladstone	Prime Minister of the United Kingdom; 5 March 1894 – 22 June 1895	Succeeded by The Marquess of Salisbury
Preceded by The Earl of Kimberley	Leader of the House of Lords; 1894–1895	Succeeded by The Marquess of Salisbury
Preceded by The Earl of Kimberley	Lord President of the Council; 1894–1895	Succeeded by The Duke of Devonshire
Preceded by The Marquess of Salisbury	Leader of the Opposition; 1895–1896	Succeeded by Sir William Harcourt
Party political offices
Preceded by William Ewart Gladstone	Leader of the Liberal Party; 1894–1896	Succeeded by Sir William Harcourt; The Earl of Kimberley
Preceded by The Earl of Kimberley	Leader of the Liberals in the House of Lords; 1894–1896	Succeeded by The Earl of Kimberley
Honorary titles
Preceded by The Earl of Hopetoun	Lord Lieutenant of Linlithgowshire (West Lothian after 1921); 1873–1929	Succeeded by The Marquess of Linlithgow
Preceded by The Duke of Buccleuch	Lord Lieutenant of Midlothian; 1884–1929	Succeeded by The Earl of Rosebery
Academic offices
Preceded by William Edward Forster	Rector of the University of Aberdeen; 1878–1881	Succeeded by Alexander Bain
Preceded by Marquess of Hartington	Rector of the University of Edinburgh; 1880–1883	Succeeded by Sir Stafford Northcote, Bt
Preceded by Joseph Chamberlain	Rector of the University of Glasgow; 1899–1902	Succeeded by George Wyndham
Preceded by The Earl of Kimberley	Chancellor of the University of London; 1902–1929	Succeeded by The Earl Beauchamp
Preceded by The Lord Kelvin	Chancellor of the University of Glasgow; 1908–1929	Succeeded by Sir Donald MacAlister, Bt
Preceded by The Lord Avebury	Rector of the University of St Andrews; 1910–1913	Succeeded by The Earl of Aberdeen
Peerage of Scotland
Preceded by Archibald Primrose	Earl of Rosebery; 1868–1929	Succeeded by Harry Primrose
Peerage of the United Kingdom
New creation	Earl of Midlothian; 1911–1929	Succeeded by Harry Primrose
Preceded by Archibald Primrose	Baron Rosebery; 1868–1929; Member of the House of Lords (1868–1929)	Succeeded by Harry Primrose
