= Archibald Primrose, Lord Dalmeny =

British Whig politician

The Right Honourable Lord Dalmeny

Member of Parliament for Stirling Burghs
- In office 1832–1847
- Preceded by: James Johnston
- Succeeded by: John Benjamin Smith

Personal details
- Born: Archibald Primrose; 2 October 1809
- Died: 23 January 1851 (aged 41)
- Party: Whig
- Spouse: Lady Catherine Lucy Wilhelmina Stanhope (m. 1843; died 1851)
- Parent(s): Archibald Primrose, 4th Earl of Rosebery; Harriett Bouverie
- Education: Harrow School; Trinity College, Cambridge

Archibald Primrose, Lord Dalmeny (2 October 1809 – 23 January 1851), was a British Whig politician.

== Early life ==
He was the eldest son and heir apparent of Archibald Primrose, 4th Earl of Rosebery (1783–1868), whom he predeceased, by his wife Harriett Bouverie.

Dalmeny was educated at Harrow School and Trinity College, Cambridge.

== Career ==
Dalmeny was a supporter of the Reform Act 1832, and became a Member of Parliament for Stirling Burghs in the elections held that year after the passage of the bill. From 25 April 1835 until the fall of Melbourne's Second Government in 1841, Dalmeny was a Civil Lord of the Admiralty. In Parliament, he opposed both the secret ballot and the income tax. He did not contest the seat in 1847, and left Parliament.

== Personal life ==
On 20 September 1843 he married Lady Catherine Lucy Wilhelmina Stanhope (1819–1901), a historian, the daughter of Philip Stanhope, 4th Earl Stanhope, by whom he had four children:

- Lady Mary Catherine Constance Primrose (1844–1935), who married Henry Walter Hope-Scott in 1885.
- Lady Constance Evelyn Primrose (1846–1939), who married Henry Wyndham, 2nd Baron Leconfield in 1867.
- Archibald Primrose, 5th Earl of Rosebery (1847–1929), who served as the prime minister of the United Kingdom from 1894 to 1895; he married Hannah de Rothschild, only child and sole heiress of banker Mayer Amschel de Rothschild, in 1878.
- Hon. Everard Henry Primrose (1848–1885), a Colonel in the Grenadier Guards and the military attaché at Vienna.

Dalmeny fell ill with pleurisy during the Christmas season of 1850, and while apparently recovering in January, died suddenly of heart failure. After Lord Dalmeny's death, Lady Dalmeny married secondly Harry Powlett, 4th Duke of Cleveland in 1854.

Parliament of the United Kingdom
Preceded by James Johnston	Member of Parliament for Stirling Burghs; 1832–1847	Succeeded by John Benjamin Smith
