= Lady Sybil Grant =

British writer and artist (1879–1955)

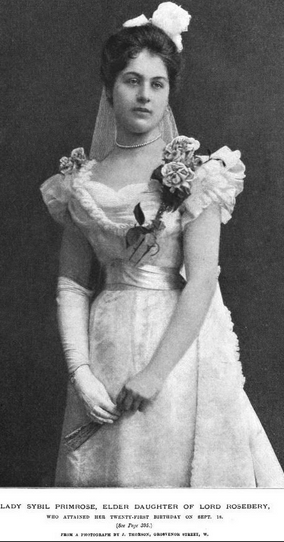
- Born: Lady Sybil Myra Caroline Primrose; 18 September 1879; Mayfair, London, England
- Died: 25 February 1955 (aged 75); Epsom, Surrey
- Spouse: Charles Grant (m. 1903)
- Issue: Charles Robert Archibald Grant
- Father: Archibald Primrose, 5th Earl of Rosebery
- Mother: Hannah de Rothschild

Lady Sybil Myra Caroline Grant (née Primrose; 18 September 1879 – 25 February 1955) was a British writer and artist. She was the eldest child of Archibald Primrose, 5th Earl of Rosebery and his wife, Hannah de Rothschild.

Apart from her artistic work, in later life she became notable as an eccentric.

== Early years ==
Portrait of Lady Sybil Primrose by Frederick, Lord Leighton

Lady Sybil was the eldest child of Archibald Primrose, 5th Earl of Rosebery, who served as prime minister to Queen Victoria from 1894 to 1895, by his marriage to Hannah de Rothschild, only child of Mayer Amschel de Rothschild (1818–1874) and a granddaughter of Nathan Mayer Rothschild (1777–1836). Through Hannah, as her father's sole heiress, the Mentmore Towers estate passed into the Rosebery family.

Her father, Lord Rosebery, in addition to a life in Liberal politics and serving briefly as prime minister, collected Napoleonic memorabilia and wrote biographies, including one of Napoleon and another of William Pitt the Younger. Her mother, the Countess Hannah, was at one time reputed to be the richest woman in England. In her childhood Sybil was taught by governesses and divided her time between the family's Lansdowne House in London and their many country houses, which included Dalmeny House and Mentmore Towers. From the time she was a baby, Lady Sybil was often left by her parents in the care of servants, supervised by her father's sister Lady Leconfield at the Leconfields' Petworth House. This was particularly evident shortly after Sybil's birth in June 1880, when Lord Rosebery wished to visit Germany for three months to take a cure at a German spa for what is now thought to have been a nervous breakdown. He had no great feeling for proximity to small babies. His wife dutifully accompanied him, but Rosebery reported that she savoured every detail of daily letters from London concerning Sybil.

Despite the lack of parental attention, Lady Sybil remained close to her father.

== Marriage ==
On 28 March 1903, at Christ Church Epsom Common (where the Rosebery family worshipped when resident at their Epsom home of "The Durdans"), Lady Sybil married Charles John Cecil Grant (1877–1950), a regular soldier who later became a knighted general. Following the wedding her father wrote: "She was wonderfully cool and held my hand all the way to the church".

She had one son, Charles Robert Archibald Grant, who married Pamela Wellesley (born 1912), a granddaughter of Arthur, 4th Duke of Wellington.

== Literary works ==
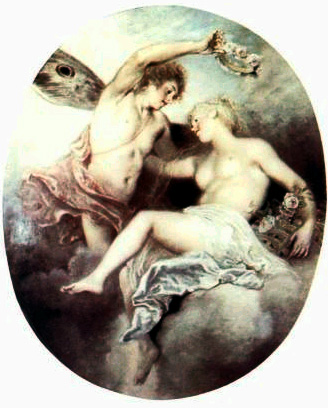
Le Printemps: one of Watteau's more Correggiesque pieces, formerly in the collection of Lady Sybil. It is the only photograph documenting the painting, which has since been destroyed.

In 1912, Lady Sybil Grant published several short stories in the London Magazine, including The Kisses That Never Were Given, A Three-Cornered Secret, and Travesty. In 1913 Mills and Boon published her Founded on Fiction, a book of comic poems. The same year The Chequer-Board appeared, followed by Samphire and The Land of Let's Pretend. In 1914, by now considered a literary figure, she was invited to contribute to Princess Mary's Gift Book, a collection of illustrated stories assembled to raise money for the Great War effort.

Lady Sybil was a patriotic admirer of the achievements of Marshal Foch, writing in a eulogy of him in 1929 that "the first impression you received was of an infinite horizon–he seemed to look beyond the common limits of human sight. When in the course of conversation he looked in your direction you felt the same helpless sense of inferiority as when, upon a night in deep summer, you look up at the stars."

== Inheritance ==
On the death of her father in 1929, she inherited one of his lesser estates, The Durdans at Epsom, which became her home. Among other things she inherited her father's extensive library at Durdans, much of which was sold at Sotheby's in 1933.

== The arts and Bohemia ==
Some of Lady Sybil's designs were in ceramics, where she drew for inspiration on her love of animals, particularly the Suffolk Punch horses which she bred. She had a great love of animals and succeeded in breeding a rare strain of dog, the Shetland Toy, which she may have saved from extinction. In 1909 she became the first to breed the rare Pyrenean Mountain Dog in England, although examples had been imported earlier, including one owned by Queen Victoria in the 1850s.

In 1937, Grant befriended the Roma who regularly visited Epsom Downs during the Derby week, dressing herself in "unusual and romantic clothes." She allowed them the use of her land, setting it aside every year for them, so that they had a legal place to camp, which had the result of halting some of the hostility between the local people and the Roma.

With the Reverend Edward Dorling she was a leading supporter of the "Lest We Forget" charitable fund, and on the charity's behalf she organised a fete in the grounds of The Durdans each year; here her pottery was often sold and in great demand.

== Later life and death ==
In later life Lady Sybil Grant became an eccentric, spending much of her time in a caravan or up a tree, communicating with her butler through a megaphone. Widowed in 1950, she died in 1955 and was survived by her son.

On her death she donated 2,700 of the remaining books, pamphlets and manuscripts from her father's collections to the National Library of Scotland. The bequest included many memoirs and pamphlets on British and European history of the 18th and 19th centuries, including biographies of Pitt and Napoleon; an uncensored first edition of Baudelaire's Les Fleurs du Mal (Paris, 1857); maps, particularly of the area around Epsom; dictionaries of slang and cant; religious works, particularly relating to Cardinal Newman; and works on horseracing and field sports, including a complete run of The Sporting Magazine from 1792 to 1870.
