= Betker =

Betker is a surname. Notable people with the surname include:

- Jan Betker (born 1960), Canadian curler
- Lars Betker (born 1971), German weightlifter

== See also ==
- Becker
- Beker (disambiguation)
- Betke
