= Midlothian campaign =

Famous political campaign

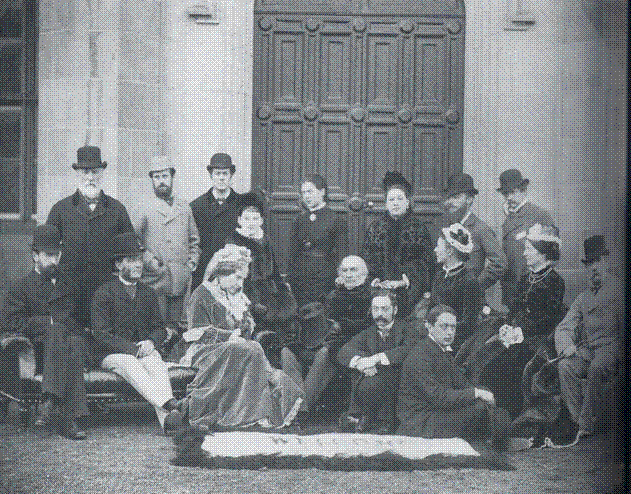
Photograph taken at Dalmeny House of the campaign's organizers in 1879. Included in the photograph are William Ewart Gladstone and his wife Catherine and daughter Mary, as well as the Earl of Rosebery (seated at front, facing right) and his Countess and the Countess's cousin Baron Ferdinand de Rothschild.

The Midlothian campaign of 1878–80 was a series of foreign policy speeches given by William Gladstone, former leader of Britain's Liberal Party, leading to his contesting the Scottish county constituency of Midlothian in the 1880 general election. Organised by the Earl of Rosebery as a media event, it is often cited as the first modern political campaign in Britain. It also set the stage for Gladstone's comeback as a politician and effective leader of the Liberal Party as his Party decisively won the general election.

Gladstone charged the Conservative government of his longstanding political enemy Benjamin Disraeli with financial incompetence, neglect of domestic legislation, and mismanagement of foreign affairs. He was able to enhance his reputation as a popular and down-to-earth politician ("The People's William") and cemented his pre-eminence as the most important politician within the Liberal Party.

The Midlothian campaign made it impossible to ignore Gladstone's leadership claim both within the Liberal Party and for Queen Victoria. Furthermore, it created a momentum that carried the Liberals to power in 1880, and Gladstone was able to form his Second ministry.

== Gladstone's personal situation in the Mid-1870s ==
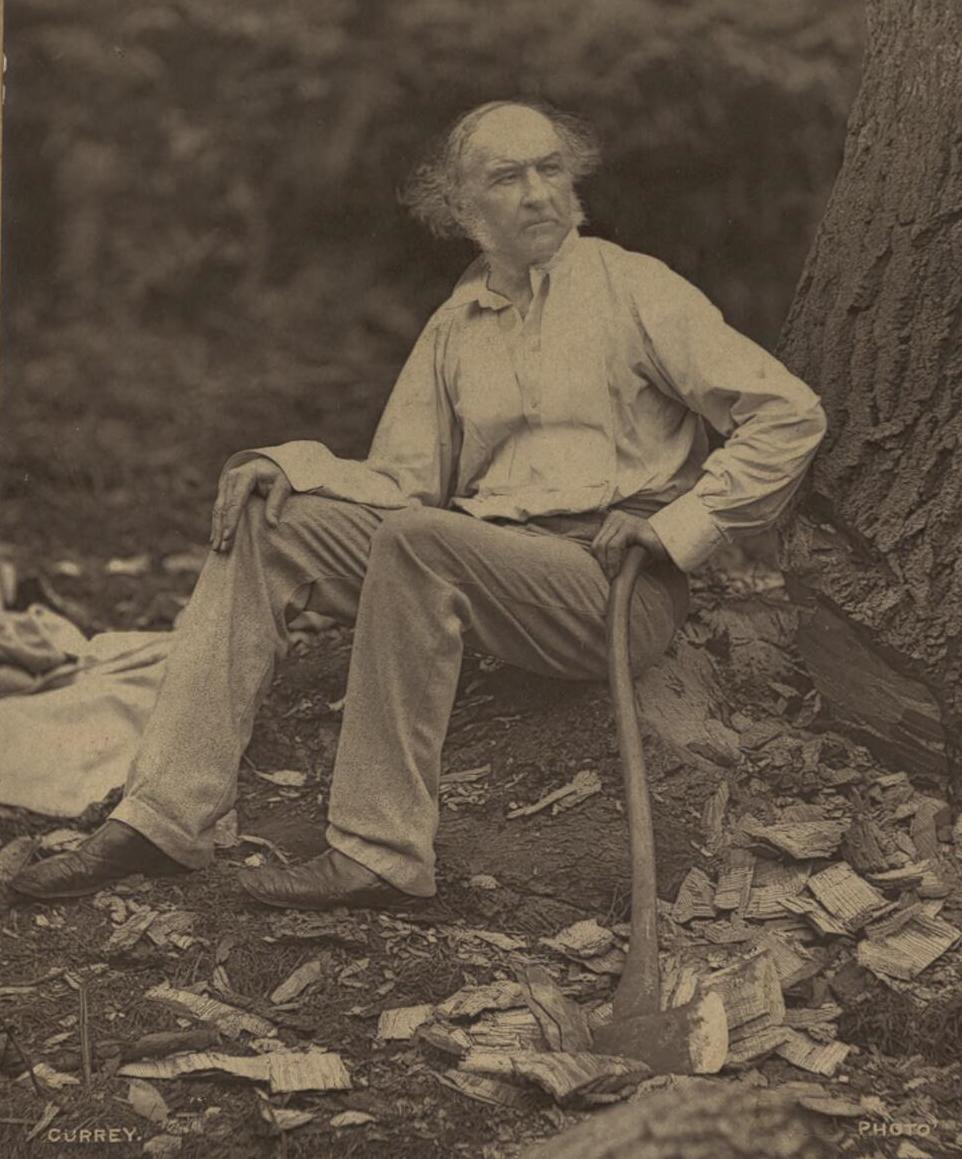
Gladstone in 1877 at Hawarden

After six years of government, the Liberal government led by Prime Minister William Ewart Gladstone came to an end when the Liberals suffered a heavy defeat in the general election of 1874. After a short transition period, Gladstone relinquished the leadership of the Liberal Party to become a mere backbencher in the British House of Commons. Subsequently, he had to suffer a painful defeat when the Public Worship Regulation Act 1874 was introduced as a Private Member's Bill by Archbishop of Canterbury Archibald Campbell Tait, to limit what the archbishop perceived as the growing ritualism of Anglo-Catholicism and the Oxford Movement within the Church of England. The bill was supported by Queen Victoria and Gladstone's longstanding political nemesis, Prime Minister Benjamin Disraeli, who saw the bill purely in political terms. Gladstone, a high church Anglican whose sympathies were for separation of church and state, felt disgusted that the liturgy was made, as he saw it, "a parliamentary football" and introduced six resolutions when the bill came to the House of Commons. But on this, he found himself out of step with his own party and had to back down when Disraeli put the weight of the government behind the bill. When the bill was passed, he retreated to his country mansion Hawarden Castle. In January 1875 he made good on a promise given years earlier and withdrew himself altogether from politics. Instead he spent his time at Hawarden, occupied with studies of Homer. After his self-imposed exile, leadership of the Liberal party was shared between Lord Hartington, who led the Liberals in the House of Commons, and Lord Granville, who was Leader of the Liberals in the House of Lords. His biographers are in accord that Gladstone's self-imposed political exile was never complete and that he privately toyed with the idea of a political comeback, waiting only for an external cause on which to base a reversal of his former decision to withdraw.

== The Bulgarian Uprising of 1876 ==
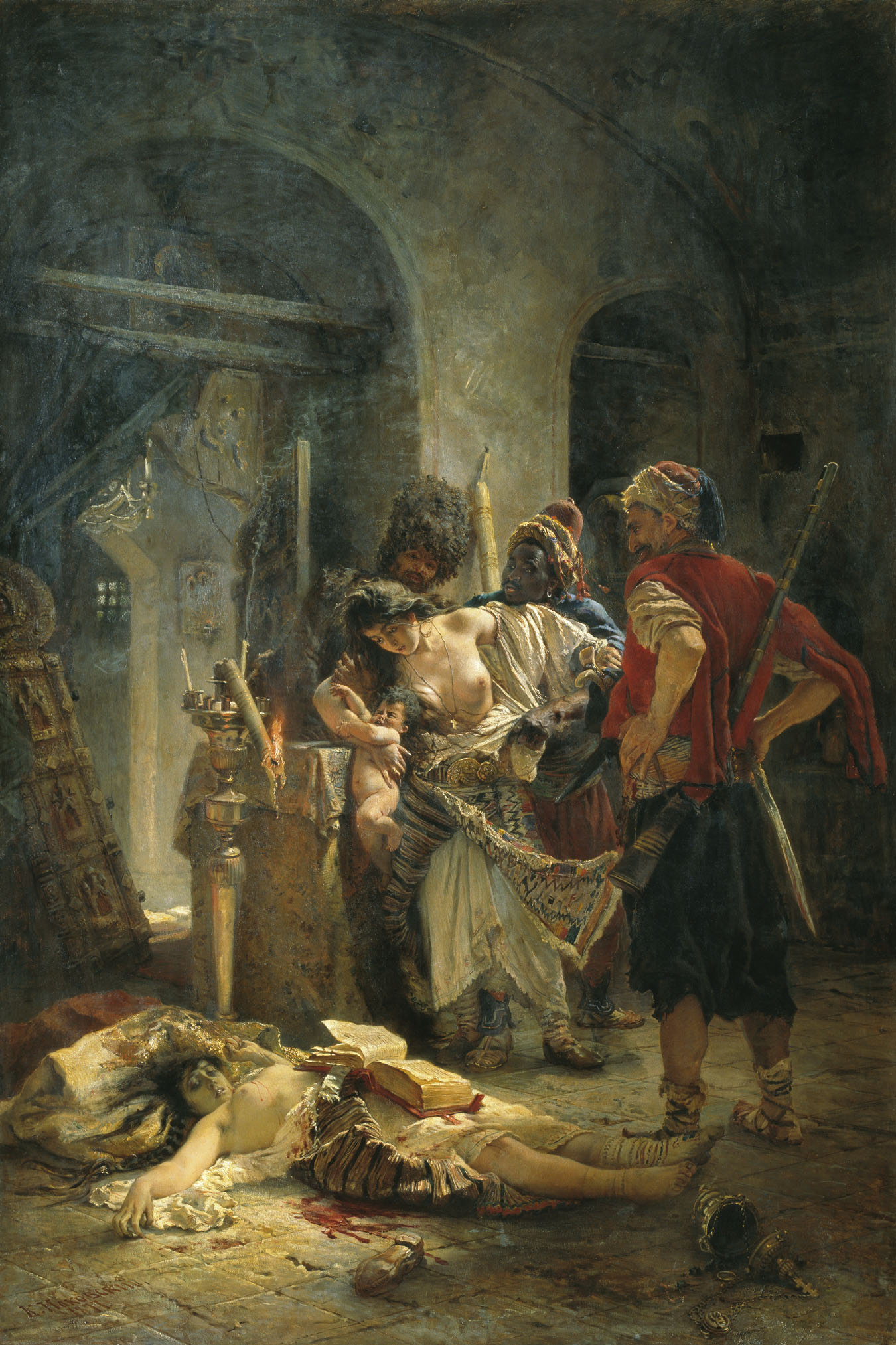
Russian painting depicting the rape of Bulgarian women during the April Uprising

In 1875, the Eastern question came to the fore for the first time since the Crimean War. In July 1875 an insurgency against Ottoman rule broke out in Herzegovina, soon spreading over to Bosnia. Then at the end of April 1876, an insurgency broke out in Bulgaria against Turkish rule. The military of the Ottoman Empire using Bashi-bazouk, undisciplined irregular troops, soon crushed the Bulgarian revolt, but in the process committed brutal massacres, killing some 12,000 people.

To block Russia from filling the vacuum, Britain had strong ties with the crumbling Ottoman Empire, long branded as Sick man of Europe. For London, it was essential to support Ottoman Empire against further Russian expansion. This stemmed partly from British suspicions over Russian intentions towards India. In the 1860s a series of Russian conquests in central Asia reinforced British concerns about Russia either marching to India direct or cutting the British route to India. British politicians & diplomats feared that by taking Constantinople, Russia would have been able to threaten the Suez canal. In the 1870s, there were voices that this dogma had in fact become obsolete. With the return of the conservatives to power in 1874, Benjamin Disraeli became prime minister. This forms a landmark in British foreign policy, as it ended a period of isolation and non-intervention. Since 1865 the policy of both parties had been to abstain from Continental affairs. From the beginning, Disraeli put his special attention to foreign policy and introduced an Imperial conception of affairs. Disraeli also feared that by taking Constantinople, Russia could at any time march their Army through Syria to Egypt. So for Britain, the "Key to India" remained in Constantinople.

== Extraparliamentary protest movements ==
News of a series of atrocities by the Ottomans during their suppression of the Bulgarian April Uprising reached the British press, despite strong efforts at censorship by the Turkish authorities. In June, the newspaper The Daily News, famous for its overseas coverage, published an account of atrocities committed by irregular troops and claimed that some twenty five thousand men, women and children had been slaughtered. The British public reaction was generally one of dismay. Throughout the summer various other reports were published by the Daily News. Sir Henry Elliot, British Ambassador at Constantinople since 1867, was strongly pro-Turk throughout his years in Constantinople. Additionally he suffered from poor health and was unable to personally investigate the allegations made by correspondents. All of this inclined Elliot to believe Turkish assurances. Although he was aware that the reports contained at least some truth, he toned down his reports to London. The government of Benjamin Disraeli ignored the outrage at first and continued its policy of support for the Ottoman Empire, an ally in the Crimean War and a bulwark against possible Russian expansion in the area. Disraeli, who was pro-Turk himself, was instinctively skeptical about published atrocity stories, a stance he had previously taken during the Indian mutiny in 1857/1858. Furthermore, the Daily News was a distinctly Liberal, Radical and reformist newspaper and very hostile to Disraeli personally. All of this combined to cause him to shrug aside the matter when he was questioned in the House of Commons about the issue. When questioned first in June, he denounced the whole story as a set-up job by the Daily News "to create a cry against the Government". A week later, he quoted from his official correspondence with Sir Henry Elliot. While he admitted that acts on both sides were equally atrocious, he defended the Turks, repeatedly requoting Elliot. In the interval between these discussions in the House of Commons Disraeli complained bitterly to his Foreign secretary Lord Derby that the Foreign Office did not supply him with the necessary accurate information before so critical a debate. He also resisted calls for a full inquiry and dismissed the reports as little more than "coffee house babble". In August a preliminary report from Walter Baring arrived in London; Baring had been sent out by the British Government to investigate what was going on. The report left no doubt that a massacre had occurred. In his speech in the House of Commons on the 11th of August, Disraeli was forced to admit the killing of twelve thousand Bulgarians; calling it a "horrible event", but contrasting the confirmed reports with the much too high figures published earlier in the Daily News along with claims of a depopulation of a province of almost four million inhabitants. Afterwards, Disraeli admitted to Derby that the debate had been "very damaging" for the Government and once again criticizing the incompetence of the Foreign Office, which had misled him initially. Both Robert Blake and R. W. Seton-Watson agree that Disraeli, already a Turcophile, with a lack of factual information, had committed himself to a path from which it was difficult to recede from without admitting publicly that he had been wrong.

Throughout August more updates came in; the American consul Eugene Schuyler, a much respected man, had been despatched from Constantinople to see for himself what was going on. He reported an "indiscriminate slaughter" and recounted that the Bashi-bazouks had locked prisoners in churches before setting fire to them. He also detailed the explicitly religious nature of the violence. Official Turkish denials were dismissed by him as "a tissue of falsehoods". The Daily News immediately published Schuyler's reports. It caused a stir in Britain. Intellectuals and clerics began to organize rallies and protests.

Gladstone took up the issue slowly, at first appearing uninterested. Young journalist W. T. Stead pressed Gladstone to join the protest. Gladstone felt uneasy, because the official liberal leader in the House of Commons, Lord Hartington, remained largely silent on the issue. By the end of August he made up his mind, in the words of John Campbell, to begin a moral crusade. He wrote to Lord Granville: "Good ends in politics can rarely be achieved without passion; and there is now, for the first time in a good many years a virtuous passion." In four days, he wrote a pamphlet, shortly published with the title, The Bulgarian Horrors and the Question of the East. In Richard Aldous' view, it was the single most influential work Gladstone ever wrote. In four days alone, it sold over forty thousand copies and by the end of September, two hundred thousand copies had been distributed. In the pamphlet, Gladstone laid down three great aims: First, he demanded an end ″to the anarchic misrule″. He further demanded administrative reform to prevent the ″recurrence of outrages″. Additionally he demanded to ″redeem the honour of the British name″. He advocated concerted action by a United Europe, which should pressure Turkey to acquiesce. Gladstone also condemned Disraeli's policies and his pleas for the status quo.

During a mass rally in Blackheath he addressed a crowd of 10,000 people. Again, Gladstone advocated a coalition of the willing to put an end to Turkish tyranny. At a meeting at St James's Hall, Gladstone once again condemned Disraeli. The meeting, which was presided by the Duke of Westminster and Lord Shaftesbury, was attended by Anthony Trollope and John Ruskin; letters of support from Thomas Carlyle, Charles Darwin and Robert Browning were recited.

== The constituency of Midlothian ==
By this point, Gladstone was already planning his return to full-time politics. At Hawarden Castle, an increasingly confident Gladstone was analyzing Liberal wins at several by-elections. He detected a swing in the national mood and told Granville: ″The pot is beginning to boil.″ Gladstone had never warmed to Greenwich, his current constituency in south-east London, feeling the constituency was too suburban, lacking the industrial vigor of Lancashire and the glamour of his former Oxford University constituency. He was now in full search for a new constituency. After his announcement that he would not stand again in Greenwich, he also made clear that he was interested to receive offers from local Liberal organizations. There were two offers before him: first, Leeds, a constituency with more than 50,000 voters and a Liberal stronghold.

The other offer was the county constituency of Edinburghshire, popularly known as Midlothian, in Scotland. Created in 1708, the constituency of Midlothian was, compared to Leeds, just a tiny constituency with only 3620 voters. Nevertheless, Midlothian offered a sophisticated, metropolitan environment steeped in the tradition of the Scottish Enlightenment. Furthermore, it was a battleground for influence between two powerful Scottish aristocratic families: The Conservative Duke of Buccleuch and the Liberal Earl of Rosebery were fighting for supremacy here since the 1860s. In 1868 a long Conservative dominance had come to an end when the Liberals, sponsored by the Earl of Rosebery, had won in Midlothian; in 1874 Lord Dalkeith, heir to the Duke of Buccleuch, had been able to win the seat back with a narrow majority for the Conservatives. Nevertheless, Rosebery convinced Gladstone that Midlothian was an ideal place to base his campaign. In the past, Scotland had been a stronghold for Liberalism.

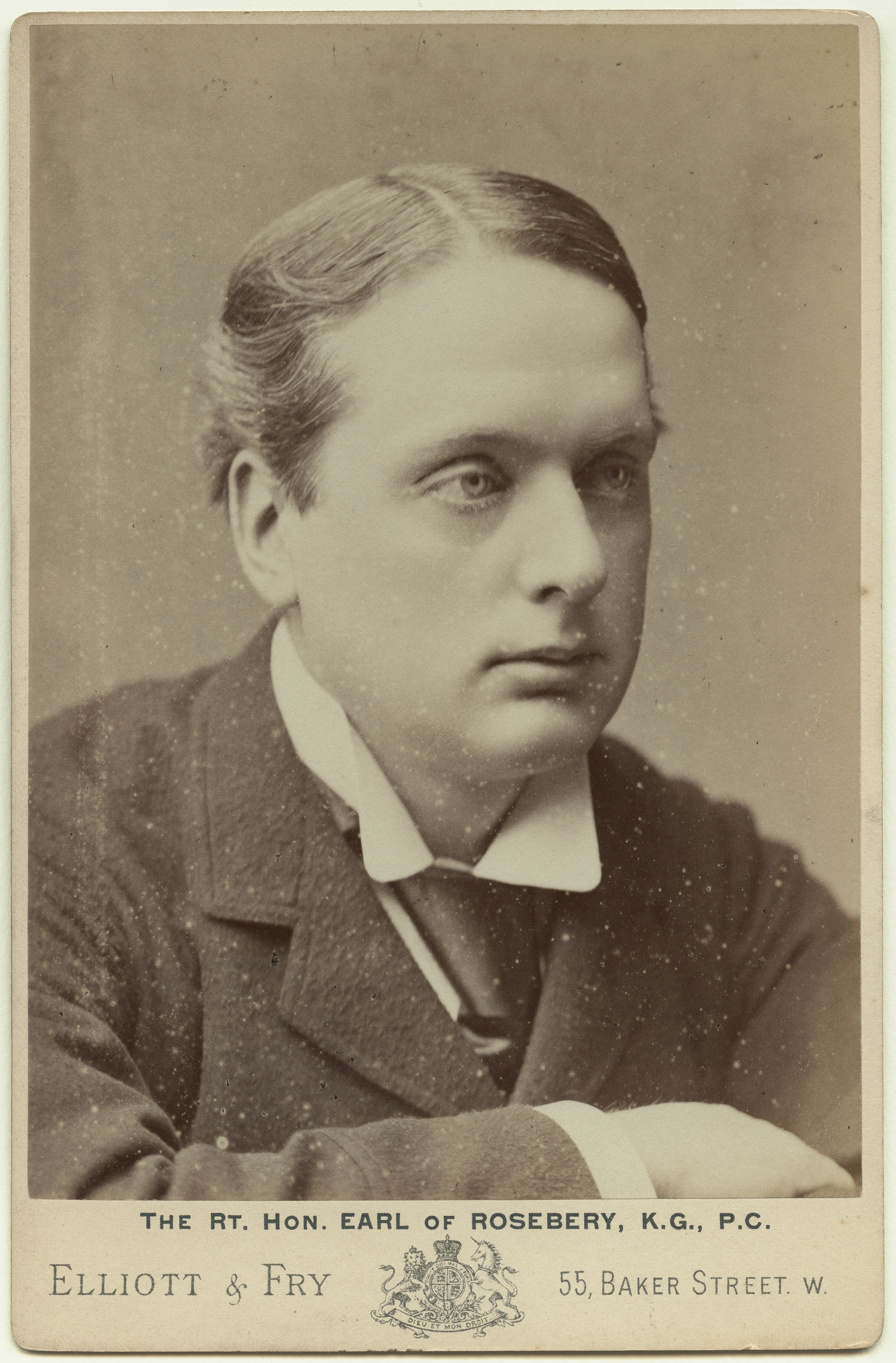
5th Earl of Rosebery

== Rosebery's campaign management ==
Rosebery, a wealthy landowner and married to Hannah de Rothschild, promised Gladstone that he would pay for all costs arising. This was a crucial promise, as a candidate in a contested constituency could expect costs approaching £3,000 (a staggering sum, roughly equivalent to £300,000 in May 2025) and members of parliament received no salary or reimbursements at all. Gladstone subsequently opted for Midlothian while Leeds fell to his son, Herbert. In February 1879, Gladstone's candidacy was publicly announced -- as it turned out, more than a year in advance of a general election.

Rosebery became Gladstone's campaign manager. Rosebery was on friendly terms with Disraeli, who had hoped to bring him into joining the Conservative party, but Rosebery's strong Whig family tradition made this all but impossible. Rosebery had been an undistinguished member of the House of Lords since 1868, when he was elevated to his title at age 21 upon the death of his grandfather, the 4th Earl. Once describing the British Upper House as a gilded cage, his activities there had been only lukewarm. This was partly due to the fact that the Liberals were only a minority parliamentary group in the House of Lords.

Rosebery was fascinated by American electioneering campaigns since he had witnessed a Democratic National Convention in 1872 before the Presidential election and described it as a great political lesson. Influenced by these lessons, he set out to organize Gladstone's campaign accordingly. Traditional Victorian electioneering had usually been based around a couple of public addresses in the constituency itself and a few visits to the country houses of local magnates, to win their support. Instead Rosebery envisaged mass gatherings and a media spectacle to reach far beyond Midlothian, always concentrating on the national mood.

== The campaign ==
The campaign began in earnest in late November 1879. The Gladstones travelled by railway from Liverpool. Rosebery had ordered a Pullman railroad car from the USA to allow Gladstone to hold speeches from a platform at the end of the railroad car. The Gladstones were greeted at every stop on their route and Gladstone spoke to cheering crowds. Arriving in Edinburgh, the Gladstones were led by Rosebery through a mass of supporters. Dalmeny House, Rosebery's magnificent Tudor Revival mansion on the Firth of Forth, northwest of the city, became Gladstone's headquarters throughout the campaign.

By 1880, Gladstone's dogged focus on the issue had dragged it to the forefront of public attention, and in the general election of 1880, Gladstone, 70 years old, toured a series of cities giving speeches of up to five hours on the subject. The nature of his orations has often been compared to that of sermons, and his fiery, emotive, but logically structured speeches are credited with swaying a large number of undecided voters to the Liberals in the 1880s, and ousting Disraeli's last Conservative government.

Equally important to the large scale of attendance at these meetings (several thousand came to each, and given the relatively narrow scale of the franchise, this meant Gladstone could address a large proportion of electors in each district) was the widespread reporting of Gladstone's speeches and the public reaction to them. Paul Brighton argues that it was a highly successful media event:

What was new about Midlothian was not that Gladstone spoke from the platform. This was already common-place for many front-rank politicians. It was the fact that the campaign was effectively designed as a media event, with specific attention to the deadlines and operational requirements of the journalists covering it and crafted for maximum impact in the morning and evening papers.

Many of Gladstone's speeches lasted up to five hours. He covered a wide range of topics, covering the entire field of British politics. He usually delivered brief remarks on the basic principles of the Liberal Party, mixed with his strong (Anglican) religious convictions. He then devoted himself extensively to foreign and domestic policy. Another powerful element of his speeches was his condemnation of "Beaconsfieldism," which he regularly denounced as immoral. (Gladstone's great rival and the incumbent Prime Minister, Disraeli, had been elevated to the House of Lords as Lord Beaconsfield.)

== Content ==
Gladstone's speeches covered the entire range of national policy. He gave his large audiences an advanced course in the principles of government that was both magisterial and exciting. The major speeches constitute a statement of the Liberal philosophy of government, reinforced by the fervor of his own deeply-held Anglican faith. Scotland, at this time, was a nation fixated on the promotion of this sort of religious and moral rectitude and probity. His focus was usually on foreign affairs. Gladstone presented his commitment to a world community, governed by law, protecting the weak. His vision of the ideal world order combined universalism and inclusiveness; he appealed to group feeling, the sense of concern for others, rising eventually to the larger picture of the unity of mankind.

== Liberal election victory in 1880 ==
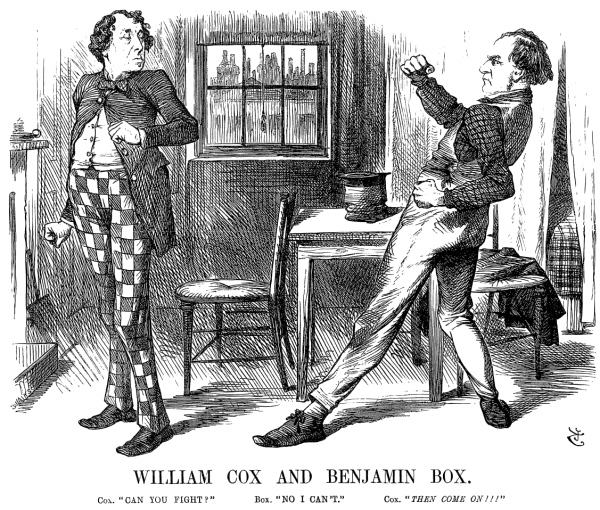
Cartoon: Disraeli versus Gladstone

All throughout the campaign, Disraeli remained deliberately quiet and avoided any public reaction. Although he and the cabinet had only planned the dissolution of Parliament and a House of Commons election for 1881, two surprising Conservative victories in by-elections caused a shift in sentiment within the cabinet. In March 1880, the parliament was dissolved at short notice and new elections were called.

Since the rules prevented peers from electioneering, the conservatives were at a disadvantage from the very beginning. With Prime Minister Disraeli, Foreign Secretary Lord Salisbury and Lord Cranbrook, the three strongest speakers of the Conservatives were by now all seated in the House of Lords and were therefore excluded from active campaigning and kept on the sidelines. On the other hand, Sir Stafford Northcote, since Disraeli's ennoblement Leader of the House of Commons, was considered an extremely weak speaker who couldn't exert any positive influence on the Conservative campaign. He was installed as his successor as Conservative Leader of the House of Commons at a time when Disraeli still assumed that Gladstone's retirement would be permanent. When Gladstone came out of retirement, however, Disraeli quickly came to regret this decision, because at once a more determined leadership of the Conservative faction in the House of Commons and a combative debating style were needed to withstand Gladstone's severe attacks. Northcote was unable to contribute that, especially since he had been at one time Gladstone's private secretary. He wasn't a good debater; moreover, he often came across as being too timid.

Furthermore, the economic crisis in agriculture in Great Britain had hit the Conservative Party particularly hard - the landowning aristocracy formed their traditional base and backbone. Lower rental income in recent years led to reduced contributions to the Conservatives' campaign funds. The Conservative campaign focused on warning voters that the Liberal Party would introduce Home Rule (i.e., self-government) in British Ireland. Although this issue would become a hot topic in the coming years, at the time of the 1880 general election it was still a new issue for voters to get used to and therefore not decisive.

In marked contrast to the Conservatives, the Liberal electoral machine was already well-established. While its Conservative counterpart was itself surprised by the cabinet's sudden decision to call an early election, the Liberal were well prepared and Gladstone quickly resumed his campaign. In terms of content, he repeated his speeches from the previous year; in a speech in Midlothian, he also presented the election campaign and the upcoming election as a struggle between the classes and the masses.

The general election held from March 31 to April 27, 1880, resulted in a large Liberal majority. Nationwide, the shift amounted to over 100 seats with Gladstone winning the constituency of Midlothian by a margin of 211 votes (1,579 to 1,368) against Lord Dalkeith. Nationwide, the general election was seen as a triumph for Gladstone. Queen Victoria, staying in Baden-Baden in southern Germany, was shocked when she heard about the election result. She had long been a strong supporter of Disraeli and had stated as recently as 1879 that she could never again accept Gladstone as a minister, as she could never have a spark of confidence in him after his "brutish, malicious, and dangerous behavior over the past three years." For this reason, she initially invited Lord Hartington, the leader of the Liberals, to form a new government. Hartington made clear, however, that no liberal government could be formed without Gladstone. Gladstone categorically refused to join any liberal government unless he himself would become Prime Minister. With no other choice left, Queen Victoria then invited Gladstone (against her wishes) to form a new government as Prime Minister, although he was not formally Leader of the Opposition,. He subsequently formed his second ministry.

== See also ==
- Tulchan
- American election campaigns in the 19th century, for contemporary campaigns
- 2026 Makerfield by-election - by-election triggered to open way for Andy Burnham to return to Parliament and challenge for the leadership of the Labour Party

== Bibliography ==
- Aldous, Richard. The Lion and the Unicorn: Gladstone vs Disraeli. Pimlico, London (2007).
- Blake, Robert (1967) [1966]. Disraeli. New York: St Martin's Press. OCLC 400326.
- Campbell, John (2009), "Benjamin Disraeli and William Gladstone", Pistols at Dawn: Two Hundred Years of Political Rivalry from Pitt and Fox to Blair and Brown., London: Vintage Books, pp. 90–140, ISBN 978-1-84595-091-0
- Feuchtwanger, Edgar. Gladstone. Palgrave Macmillan, London (1989) ISBN 978-0-333-47272-9
- Jenkins, Roy. Gladstone (1997) pp 399–415
- Kelley, Robert. "Midlothian: A Study In Politics and Ideas," Victorian Studies (1960) 4#2 pp 119–140. online
- Matthew, H. C. G Gladstone: 1809-1898 (1997) pp 293–313
- McKinstry, Leo. Rosebery. Statesman in Turmoil. John Murray Publishers, London (2005).
- Seton-Watson, R. W. (1972), Disraeli, Gladstone, and the Eastern Question: A Study in Diplomacy and Party Politics.., London: W.W. Norton & Company, ISBN 978-0-393-00594-3

=== Further reading ===
- Blair, Kirstie. "The People's William and the People's Poets: William Gladstone and the Midlothian Campaign." The People's Voice (2018) online.
- Brooks, David. "Gladstone and Midlothian: The Background to the First Campaign," Scottish Historical Review (1985) 64#1 pp 42–67. online
- Brown, Stewart J. “‘Echoes of Midlothian’: Scottish Liberalism and the South African War, 1899–1902.” Scottish Historical Review 71#191/192, (1992), pp. 156–83, online.
- Fitzsimons, M. A. "Midlothian: the Triumph and Frustration of the British Liberal Party," Review of Politics (1960) 22#2 pp 187–201. in JSTOR
- Whitehead, Cameron Ean Alfred. "The Bulgarian Horrors: culture and the international history of the Great Eastern Crisis, 1876-1878" (PhD. Dissertation, University of British Columbia, 2014) online
- Yildizeli, Fahriye Begum. "W.E. Gladstone and British Policy Towards the Ottoman Empire." (PhD dissertation, University of Exeter, 2016) online.

=== Primary sources ===
- Gladstone, W.E. Midlothian Speeches. 1879 (Leicester University Press, 1971).
- Gladstone, William E. Midlothian Speeches 1884 with an Introduction by M. R. D. Foot, (New York: Humanities Press, 1971) online
