= Walter Beke =

Anglo-Flemish nobleman

Walter I Beke (fl. 12th century) (alias Bech, Bek, Beche, Beke, Beek, Bec, etc. Latinised to de Becco), of Eresby in the parish of Spilsby in Lincolnshire, was a prominent Anglo-Flemish landholder.

He held seven knight's fees from the Bishop of Durham as his feudal overlord. At some time after 1167 he gave the Church of Newton to Alvingham Priory, and after his eldest son Hugh was made a knight, he gave lands to Kirkstead Abbey, the cartulary of which records much information relating to his family.

== Marriage and children ==
He married Agnes FitzPinco, daughter and heiress of Hugh FitzPinco, lord of the manor of Eresby, by whom he had four sons:

- Hugh Beke (d.1189), eldest son and heir apparent, who died unmarried on his return from Crusade.
- Henry Beke, "weak of understanding", who nevertheless "found a well born and richly dowered bride", Alice de Multon, sister of Thomas de Multon. His son was Walter II Beke, of Eresby, who married Eve de Grey, a niece of Walter de Grey (d.1255), Archbishop of York, and Lord Chancellor, and left three powerful sons:
  - John Beke, 1st Baron Beke (c.1230–1303), of Eresby
  - Thomas Beke (d.1293), Lord Treasurer of England in 1279, Bishop of St David's in 1280, Chancellor of Oxford University in 1289.
  - Anthony Beke (d.1310/11), Prince-Bishop of Durham in 1283, Patriarch of Jerusalem in 1305, "one of the greatest warriors of the day...who died seized of vast possessions in divers counties". He was "one of the chief potentates of his age", whom William Dugdale described as follows: "The prowdest Lorde in Christientie...No man in all the realm, except the King, did equal him for habit, behaviour, and military pomp; and he was more versed in state affairs than in ecclesiastical duties, ever assisting the King most powerfully in his wars, having sometimes in Scotland 26 Standard Bearers, and of his ordinary retinue 140 Knights, so that he was thought to be rather a temporal Prince than a priest or Bishop".
- Walter Beke, 3rd son, of Lusceby in Lincolnshire, whose grandson Walter Beke was Constable of Lincoln Castle during the reign of King Henry III (1216–1272).
- Thomas Beke, a priest.

== Sources ==
- Duchess of Cleveland, Battle Abbey Roll, 1889, Beke
