= John Beke, 1st Baron Beke =

Arms of Beke: Gules, a cross recerclée argent. The arms are also shown as a cross moline

John Beke, 1st Baron Beke (died 1303/04) of Eresby in the parish of Spilsby, Lincolnshire, was a baron.

== Origins ==
He was the eldest son and heir of Walter II Beke, of Eresby, by his wife Eve de Grey, a niece of Walter de Gray (d.1255), Archbishop of York and Lord Chancellor. Walter II was a son of Henry Beke, "weak of understanding", who nevertheless "found a well born and richly dowered bride", Alice de Multon, sister of Thomas de Multon. Henry Beke was a son of Walter I Beke (fl.12th.c), a prominent Anglo-Flemish landholder, by his wife Agnes FitzPinco, daughter and heiress of Hugh FitzPinco, lord of the manor of Eresby.

John Beke died in 1303/04, "when any Barony created by the writ of 1295 would be held, by modern doctrine, to have fallen into abeyance."

== Sources ==
- Cokayne, G. E. (1910). The Complete Peerage of England, Scotland, Ireland, Great Britain and the United Kingdom, extant, extinct or dormant (Ab-Adam to Basing). Vol. 1 (2nd ed.). London: The St Catherine Press. p. 89.
- Beke, T., FSA, Observations on the Pedigree of the Family of Beke of Eresby, in the County of Lincoln, published in Collectanea Topographica et Genealogica, Vol.4, pp. 331–345

Peerage of England
New creation	Baron Beke; 1295–1304	Abeyant
