= Wilhelmina Powlett, Duchess of Cleveland =

English historian and genealogist

Her Grace The Duchess of Cleveland
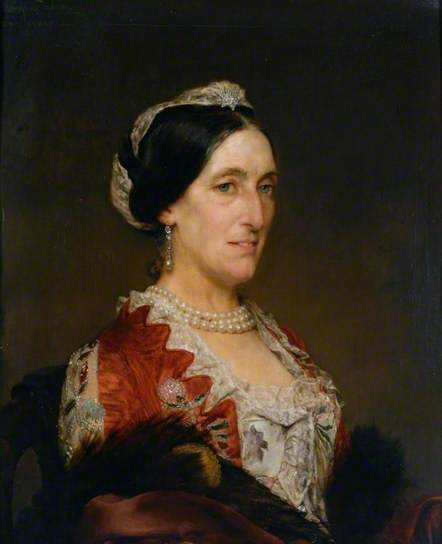
- The Duchess of Cleveland in an 1883 portrait by Sir Lawrence Alma-Tadema. Bowes Museum, Barnard Castle, Durham
- Other names: Lady Dalmeny; Lady Harry Vane
- Born: Lady Catherine Lucy Wilhelmina Stanhope; 1 June 1819; Mayfair, England
- Died: 18 May 1901 (aged 81); Wiesbaden, Hesse, Germany
- Spouses: Archibald Primrose, Lord Dalmeny (m. 1843; died 1851) Harry Powlett, 4th Duke of Cleveland (m. 1854; died 1891)
- Issue: Archibald Primrose, 5th Earl of Rosebery
- Father: Philip Henry Stanhope, 4th Earl Stanhope
- Mother: Hon. Catherine Lucy Smith
- Occupation: Historian, genealogist

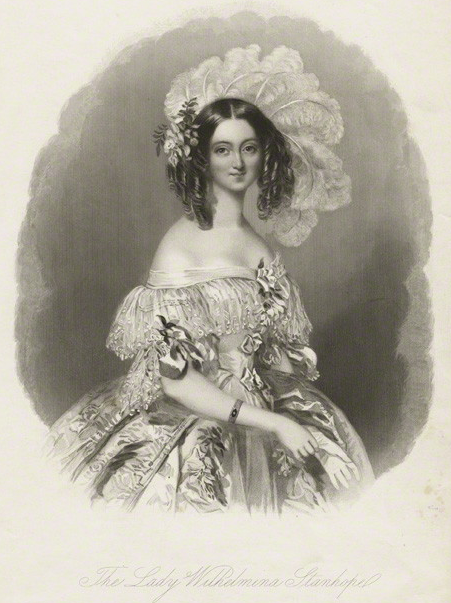
Lady Wilhelmina Stanhope, 1838 engraving after Alfred Edward Chalon (1780–1860). National Portrait Gallery, London

Catherine Lucy Wilhelmina Powlett, Duchess of Cleveland (née Stanhope; 1 June 1819 – 18 May 1901), also known as Lady Dalmeny and Lady Harry Vane, was an English courtier, historian and genealogist, best known for her 1889 work The Battle Abbey Roll with some Account of the Norman Lineages.

By her first marriage to Lord Dalmeny, she was the mother of Prime Minister Archibald Primrose, 5th Earl of Rosebery.

== Biography ==
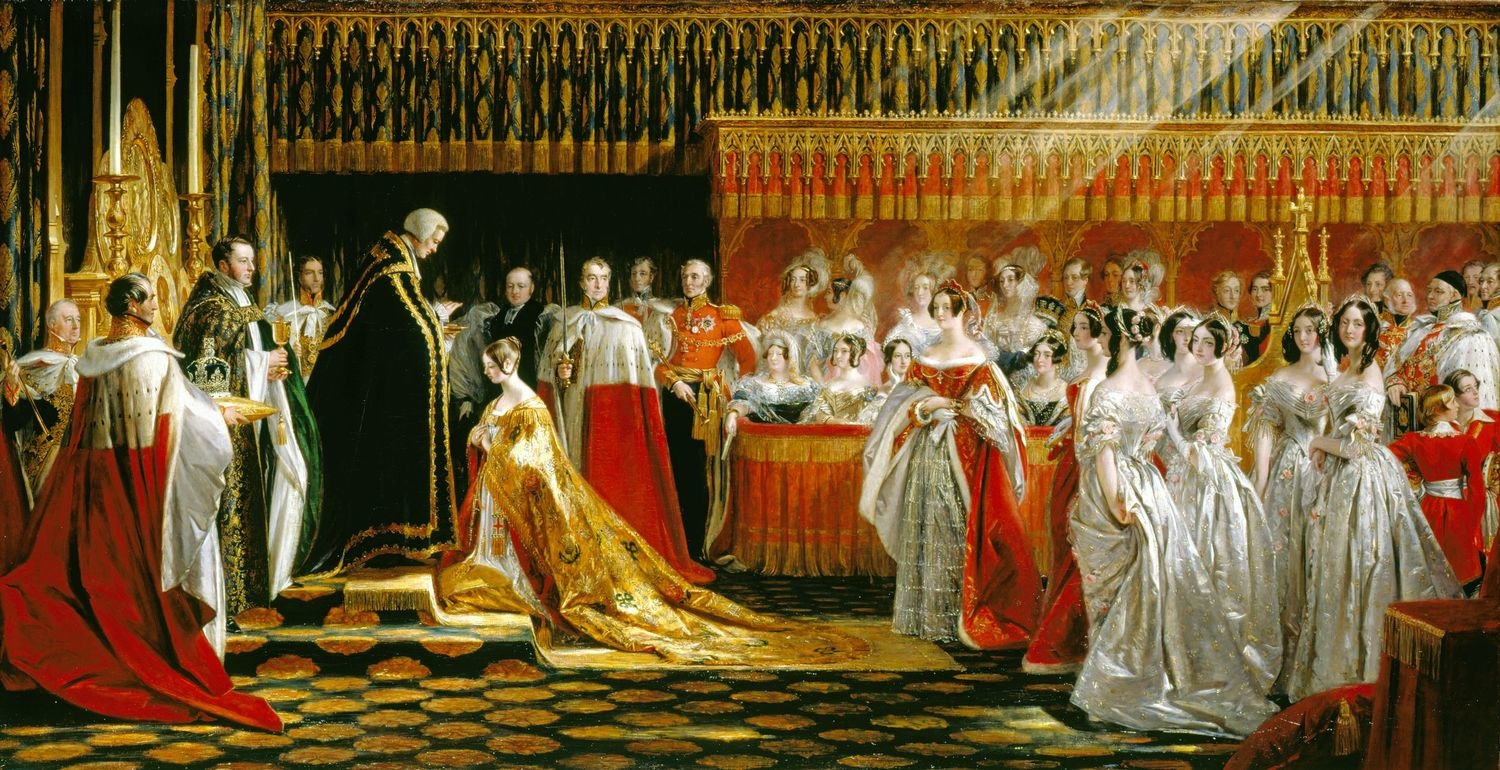
Charles Robert Leslie's portrait, Queen Victoria Receiving the Sacrament at her Coronation, depicts Lady Wilhelmina, the second train-bearer from the right.

Lady Wilhelmina Stanhope was born in Mayfair, the third child and only daughter of Philip Henry Stanhope, 4th Earl Stanhope (1781–1855), FRS, and his wife, Hon. Catherine Lucy Smith, daughter of Robert Smith, 1st Baron Carrington. She was known as Wilhelmina to distinguish her from her mother.

At the time of Queen Victoria's accession, the 18-year-old Lady Wilhelmina was regarded as one of the most beautiful woman at court. She was a train-bearer at the queen's coronation in 1838, and served as a bridesmaid at her wedding to Prince Albert in 1840.

== Marriages and progeny ==
Wilhelmina married twice, firstly in October 1843 to Archibald Primrose, Lord Dalmeny (1809–1851), eldest son of Archibald Primrose, 4th Earl of Rosebery (1783–1868), whom she met three months before at a ball at Buckingham Palace.

They had two sons and two daughters before Dalmeny's early death to heart failure. Their eldest son, also named Archibald, inherited the earldom and went on to become prime minister.

- Lady Constance Evelyn Primrose (died 27 June 1939); married Henry Wyndham, 2nd Baron Leconfield, and had issue.
- Lady Mary Catherine Constance Primrose (circa 1845 – 3 September 1935); married Henry Walter Hope and had issue.
- Archibald Philip Primrose, 5th Earl of Rosebery (7 May 1847 – 21 May 1929)
- Everard Henry Primrose (8 September 1848 – 9 April 1885); died unmarried.

She was married secondly in 1854 to Lord Harry Vane (1803–1891), youngest son of William Vane, 1st Duke of Cleveland (1766–1842); he succeeded his brother in the dukedom in 1864, and changed his surname to Powlett. They had no children, and on Cleveland's death all his titles became extinct, with the exception of the barony of Barnard.

== Death ==
Shortly before her 88th birthday, the Duchess unexpectedly died of a cardiac arrest in Wiesbaden, Hesse, a week after undergoing successful eye surgery. "In spite of her advanced age the Duchess of Cleveland was an indefatigable traveller, and her faculties and interests remained undimmed," reported The Times in her obituary.

== List of works ==
Her historical works included:

- The Battle Abbey Roll with some Account of the Norman Lineages, 3 volumes, London, 1889. It consists of short histories concerning the origins of several hundred English families of Norman origin, based on names supposedly contained in the legendary Battle Abbey Roll:
  - Vol.1, London, 1889
  - Vol.2, London, 1889
  - Vol.3, London, 1889
    - See online text of all three volumes, with index, at:
- The True Story of Kaspar Hauser from Official Documents, London, 1893. Concerns her father's patronage of the "foundling" or "feral child" Kaspar Hauser, a youth who had appeared in Nuremberg in 1828 and had become famous through his claim to have been raised in total isolation in a dark room and could tell nothing about his identity.
- The Life and Letters of Lady Hester Stanhope, 1914. Concerns her father's half-sister Lady Hester Stanhope (1776–1839), a traveler and Arabist who died unmarried at the age of 63 in Syria.
