= Ferne =

Ferne may refer to:

== People ==
=== With the surname ===
- Henry Ferne (1602–1662), English bishop
- Hortense Ferne (1885–1976), American artist
- John Ferne (1553–1609), English writer, lawyer and MP

=== With the given name ===
- Ferne Carter Pierce (1920–1978), American farmer and politician
- Ferne Jacobs, American fiber artist and basket maker
- Ferne Koch (1913–2001), American photographer
- Ferne Labati (born 1947), American former basketball coach
- Ferne McCann (born 1990), English model, television personality, and presenter
- La Ferne Price (1926–2016), American baseball player
- Ferne Snoyl (born 1985), Dutch former professional footballer

== Places ==
- Ferne, Wiltshire, a hamlet in Berwick St John parish, England
- Ferne House, a historic house in Donhead St Andrew parish, Wiltshire, England; adjacent to the hamlet
- Ferne Animal Sanctuary, an animal sanctuary in Wambrook, Somerset, England
- Ferne Clyffe State Park, a state park in Johnson County, Illinois, United States

== See also ==
- Capel-le-Ferne, Kent, England, a village
- Fern (disambiguation)
