= Fearne =

Fearne is a given name and a surname. Notable people with the name include:

Given name:

- Elizabeth Fearne Bonsall (1861–1956), American painter and illustrator
- Fearne Cotton (born 1981), English broadcaster and author
- Fearne Ewart (born 1936), British former swimmer

Surname:

- Aaron Fearne, Australian basketball coach and former professional player
- Charles Fearne (1742–1794), English jurist
- Chris Fearne MP (born 1963), Maltese physician and politician
- Thomas Fearne (1846–1901), farmer and politician

== See also ==
- Holly & Fearne Go Dating, British reality TV show first broadcast in 2007
- Fearne Calloway, a fictional faun druid / rogue in the D&D web series Critical Role
- Fearn (disambiguation)
- Ferne (disambiguation)
