= Fearn =

Fearn may refer to:

- Fearn, Highland, a small hamlet near Hill of Fearn
  - Fearn railway station, serving the two
  - RNAS Fearn (HMS Owl), a Royal Navy Fleet Air Arm base, active 1941–1957
- Fearn (letter), the third letter of the Ogham alphabet, as named in Irish
- Fearn Abbey, Ross-shire, Scotland
- Hill of Fearn, a village in Easter Ross, Scotland

== People ==
- Amy Fearn (born 1977), English football referee
- John Fearn (disambiguation)
- Naomi Fearn (born 1976), German–American comic artist
- Sir Robin Fearn (1934–2006), British diplomat
- Ronnie Fearn, Baron Fearn (1931–2022), British politician
- Sheila Fearn (born 1940), British actress
- Thomas Fearn (1789–1863), American Confederate politician
- Walker Fearn (1832–1899), American diplomat

== See also ==
- Fern (disambiguation)
