= John Fearn =

John Fearn may refer to:

- John Fearn (whaler) (fl. 1798), English whaling ship captain who was the first European to travel to Nauru
- John Fearn (philosopher) (1768–1837), British philosopher and retired Royal Navy officer
- John Walker Fearn (1832–1899), American diplomat
- John Russell Fearn (1908–1960), British writer

== See also ==
- Sir John Ferne (c. 1560–1609), English knight, writer on heraldry, genealogist, and lawyer
