= USS Fern =

USS Fern is a name used more than once by the U.S. Navy:

- USS Fern (1862), a tugboat used during the American Civil War
- USS Fern (1871), a lighthouse tender built in 1871 that was transferred to the US Navy in 1891.
- USLHT Fern (1915), a lighthouse tender, was acquired by the Navy and placed in service on 4 September 1917. She was assigned to the 13th Naval District and patrolled Alaskan waters until her return to the Lighthouse Service under Executive Order of 1 July 1919.
