= Neil Primrose, 3rd Earl of Rosebery =

Scottish peer and politician

The Right Honourable The Earl of Rosebery KT
- Born: Neil Primrose; 1728; Dalmeny, West Lothian, Scotland
- Died: 25 March 1814 (aged 84–85); Dalmeny, West Lothian, Scotland
- Spouse(s): Susan Ward (m. 1764; died 1771) Mary Vincent (m. 1775; died 1814)
- Children: 5, including Mary, Archibald
- Parent(s): James Primrose, 2nd Earl of Rosebery; Mary Campbell
- Relatives: Archibald Primrose, 1st Earl of Rosebery (grandfather); John Campbell (grandfather); John Campbell, 4th Duke of Argyll (uncle); Charles Campbell (uncle); William Campbell (uncle)

Neil Primrose, 3rd Earl of Rosebery KT (1728 – 25 March 1814) was a Scottish peer and politician.

== Early life ==
Primrose was born in 1728 in Dalmeny, West Lothian, Scotland. He was a younger son of James Primrose, 2nd Earl of Rosebery and Mary Campbell. Among his siblings were Lady Dorothea Primrose (wife of Sir Adam Inglis, 3rd Baronet), Archibald Primrose, Lord Dalmeny (who died young), and John Primrose, Lord Dalmeny (who died unmarried in August 1755). His father "was imprisoned for riot and debt, and considerably depleted his inheritance. His entailed estates were put in the hands of trustees."

His paternal grandparents were Archibald Primrose, 1st Earl of Rosebery and Dorothea Cressy (a daughter of Everingham Cressy). His maternal grandparents were Hon. John Campbell (a son of the 9th Earl of Argyll and Lady Mary Stuart, a daughter of the 4th Earl of Moray) and Elizabeth Elphinstone (a daughter of the 8th Lord Elphinstone). Among his extended family were uncles John Campbell, 4th Duke of Argyll, Charles Campbell, MP for Argyllshire, William Campbell, MP for Glasgow, and aunt Primrose Cambell (wife of Simon Fraser, 11th Lord Lovat).

== Career ==
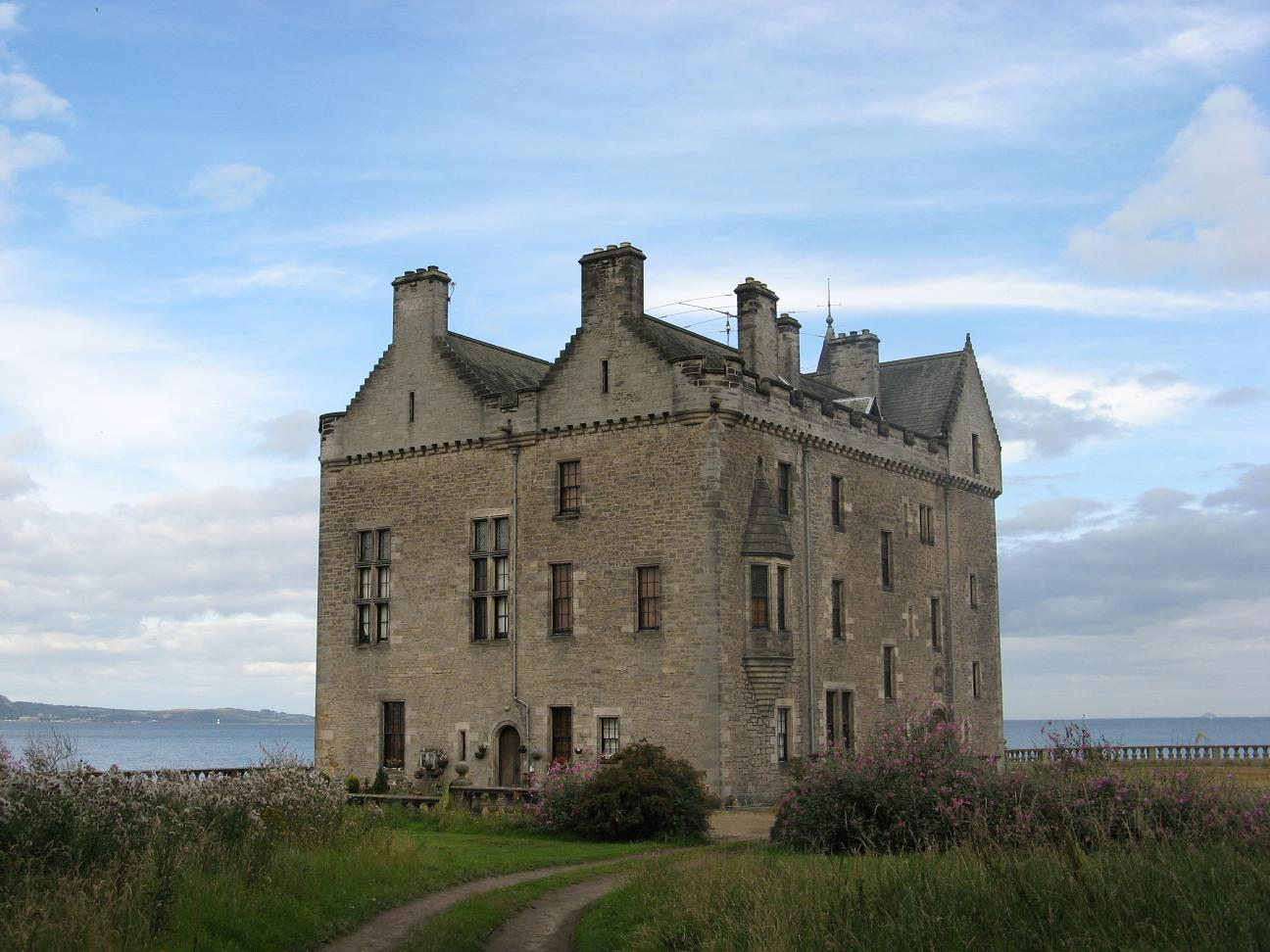
Barnbougle Castle seen from the south-west

Primrose was a merchant in London until the death of his father on 26 November 1755, when he succeeded as the 3rd Earl of Rosebery, the 3rd Viscount of Rosebery, the 3rd Viscount of Inverkeithing, the 3rd Lord Primrose and Dalmeny, the 7th Baronet Primrose, of Carrington. After inheriting the earldom, he left immediately for an 18-month Grand Tour, visiting Rome and Venice, where he spent a good deal of time with architect Robert Adam, whom he had known at home.

On his return from his Grand Tour, he worked to free the Roseberry estate of debt, reorganise its farming practises, and plant trees. He was appointed a Representative peer for Scotland in 1768, 1774, and 1780.

He was elected and invested as a Knight of the Order of the Thistle on 4 March 1771.

== Personal life ==
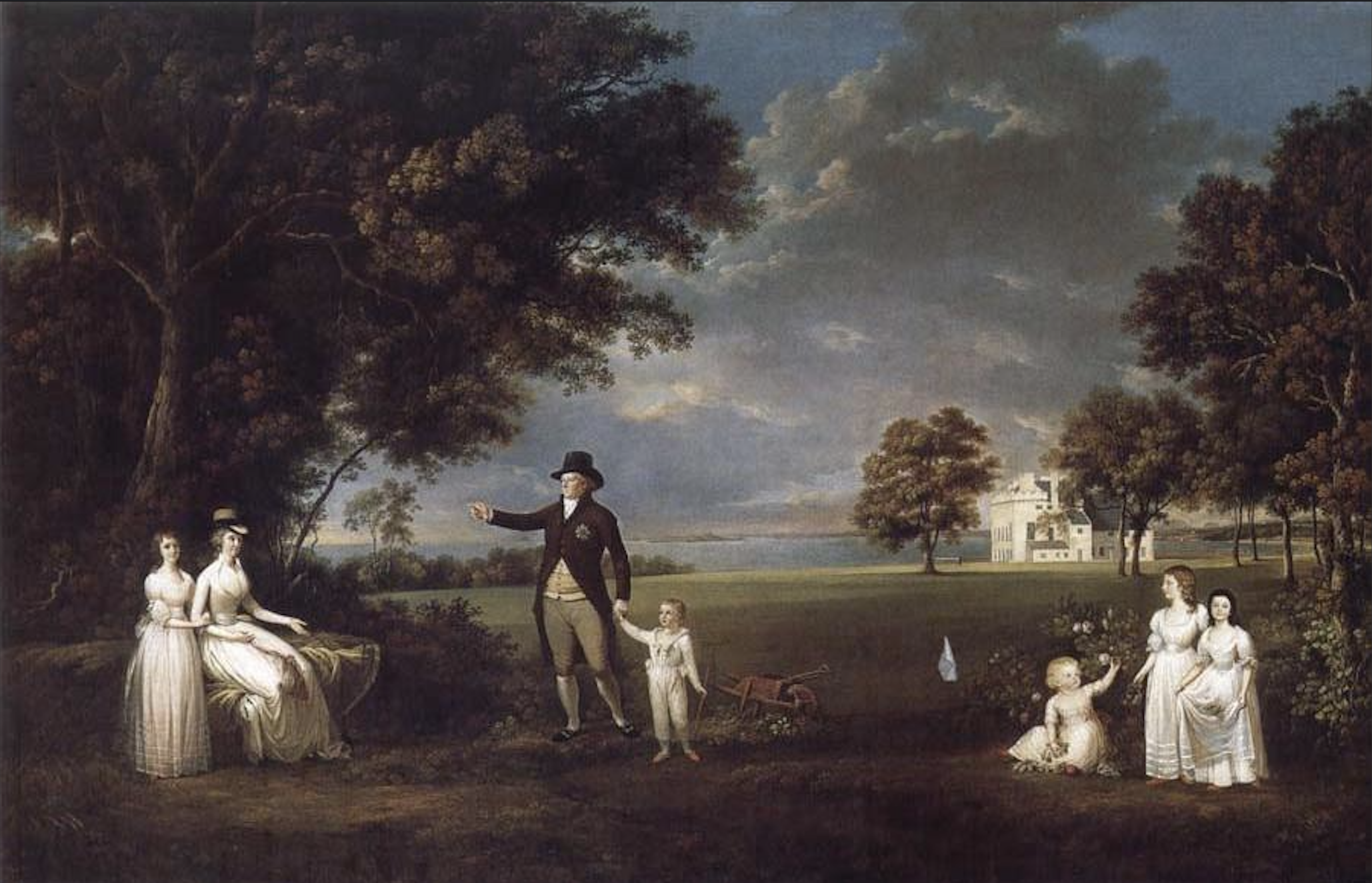
The Earl of Rosebery with his family outside of Barnbougle Castle, by Alexander Nasmyth, 1788

On 19 May 1764, he married heiress Susan Ward, a daughter of Sir Edward Ward, 5th Baronet. Susan died, without issue, on 20 August 1771, leaving him her Norfolk estate.

On 17 July 1775, he married, secondly, Mary Vincent, daughter of Sir Francis Vincent, 7th Baronet, and Mary Howard (the daughter of Lt.-Gen. Hon. Thomas Howard, who served as Governor of Berwick, and Mary Moreton, the youngest daughter of William Moreton, Bishop of Meath). Before his death in 1814, they lived at Barnbougle Castle and had five children, including:

- Lady Charlotte Primrose (c. 1776–1864), who married Gen. Kenneth Howard, 1st Earl of Effingham, son of Lt.-Gen. Thomas Howard, in 1800. After his death in 1845, she married Thomas Holmes in 1858.
- Lady Mary Primrose (1777–1847), who married Henry John Shepherd, son of Sir Samuel Shepherd and Elizabeth White (sister of Attorney General John White), in 1808.
- Lady Dorothea Arabella Primrose (1779–1825), who married William Hervey of Bodwell Hall, Carnavon, son of Thomas Hervey, Esq., in 1801.
- Archibald John Primrose, 4th Earl of Rosebery (1783–1868), who married Harriett Bouverie, daughter of Hon. Bartholomew Bouverie (a son of the 1st Earl of Radnor), in 1808. They divorced in 1815, (Note: The 4th Earl's wife, Harriet, caused a society scandal when she had an affair with her brother-in-law Sir Henry St John-Mildmay, 4th Baronet (the widower of her deceased sister Charlotte). She divorced Lord Rosebery and married St John-Mildmay in Stuttgart after obtaining a special permission by the King of Württemberg.) and he married Hon. Anne Margaret Anson, daughter of Thomas Anson, 1st Viscount Anson and Lady Anne Margaret Coke (a daughter of the 1st Earl of Leicester), in 1819.
- Hon. Francis Ward Primrose (1785–1860), who married Percy Gore, daughter of Col. Ralph Gore of Barrowmount, County Kilkenny, in 1829.

Lord Rosebery died in Dalmeny on 25 March 1814 and was succeeded in his titles by his eldest son, Archibald. His widow died on 9 March 1823.

=== Descendants ===
Through his eldest son, he was a grandfather of Archibald John Primrose, Lord Dalmeny (1809–1851), who predeceased the 4th Earl so the earldom passed directly to his son, Archibald Primrose, 5th Earl of Rosebery (1847–1929), who briefly served as Prime Minister of the United Kingdom from 1894 to 1895.

== Arms ==
Coat of arms of Neil Primrose, 3rd Earl of Rosebery
Crest A demi-lion gules holding in the dexter paw a primrose or. Escutcheon Quarterly: 1st and 4th, vert, three primroses within a double tressure flory counterflory or (Primrose); 2nd and 3rd, Argent, a lion rampant, double queued sable (Cressy). Supporters Two lions or. Motto Fide et fiducia (By fidelity and confidence). Orders The Most Ancient and Most Noble Order of the Thistle.

Peerage of Scotland
Preceded by James Primrose	Earl of Rosebery; 1755–1814	Succeeded by Archibald John Primrose
