= Fern (disambiguation) =

Fern is the common name for plants in the class Polypodiopsida.

Fern may also refer to:

== Places ==
=== In the United Kingdom ===
- Fern, Angus, see List of listed buildings in Fern, Angus
- Fern, Buckinghamshire, a hamlet

=== In the United States ===
- Fern, Iowa, an unincorporated community
- Fern, Pleasants County, West Virginia, an unincorporated community
- Fern, Wisconsin, a town
  - Fern (community), Wisconsin, an unincorporated community

== Other uses ==
- FERN, the Forests and the European Union Resource Network
- Fern (letter), in Ogham, a medieval Irish alphabet
- Fern (moth), common name of the geometer moth Horisme tersata
- Fern (name), a given name and surname
- Fern (rapper) (born 1979), Puerto Rican rapper
- Fern (TV series)
- USS Fern, several ships

== See also ==
- Fearn (disambiguation)
- Ferns (disambiguation)
