= Lady Mary Shepherd =

Scottish philosopher (1777–1847)

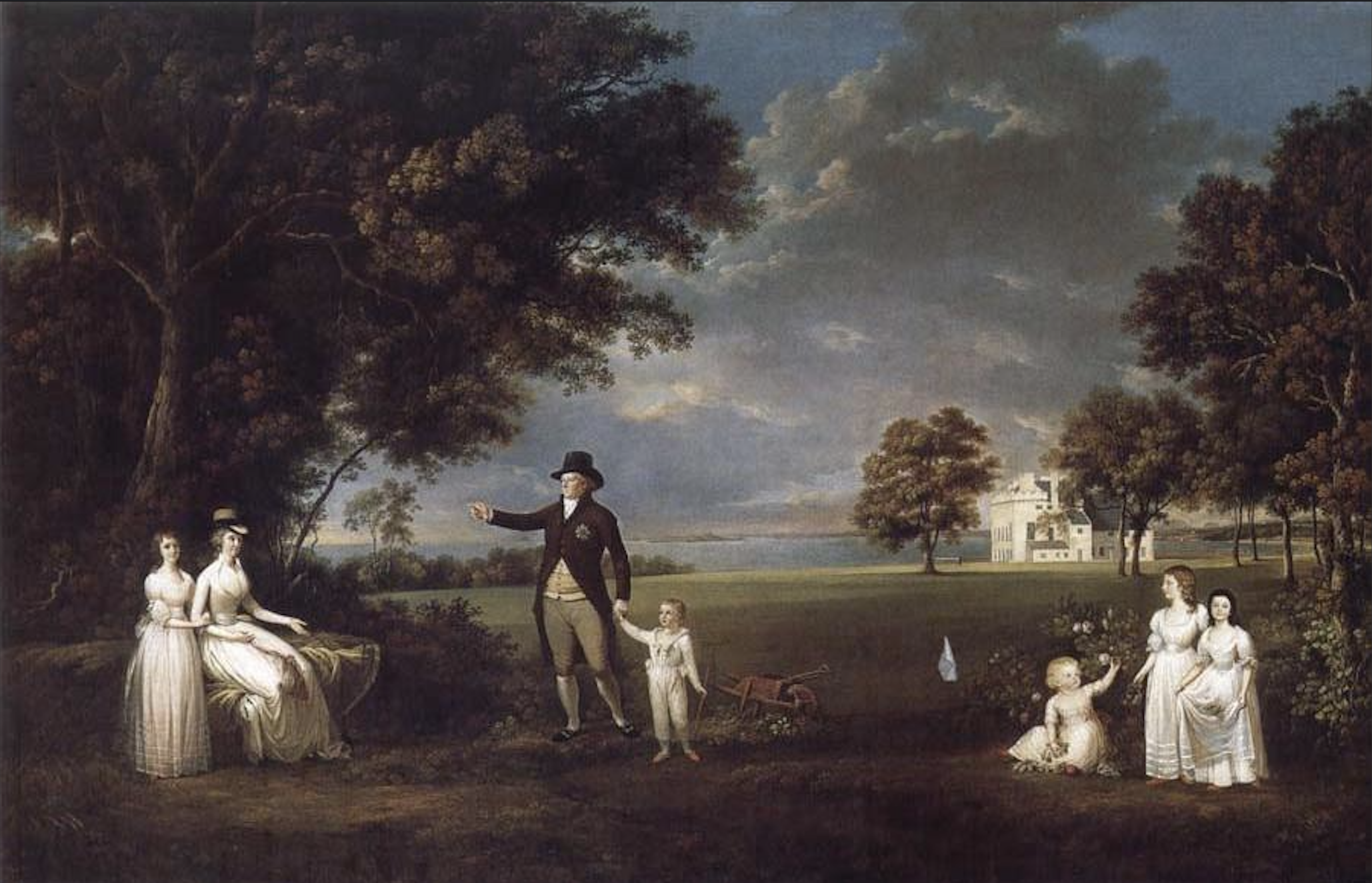
- The 3rd Earl of Rosebery with his family outside of Barnbougle Castle. Painted by Alexander Nasmyth in 1788. Mary Primrose is second from the right.
- Born: Mary Primrose; December 31, 1777; Barnbougle Castle, Edinburgh, Scotland
- Died: January 7, 1847; Hyde Park, London
- Occupation: philosopher
- Spouse: Henry John Shepherd (m. 1808)
- Children: Mary Elizabeth Shepherd; Henry Primrose Shepherd; Maria Charlotte Shepherd
- Parents: Mary Vincent; Neil Primrose, 3rd Earl of Rosebery

Education
- Education: private tutor, Mr. Pillans

Philosophical work
- Era: 19th-century philosophy
- Region: Western philosophy; Scottish philosophy
- Language: English
- Notable works: Essays on the Perception of an External Universe and Subjects Connected with the Doctrine of Causation; Lady Mary Shepherd’s Metaphysics; Observations on Mr. Fearn’s Lines of the Human Mind; On the Causes of Single and Erect Vision

Lady Mary Shepherd, (née Primrose; 31 December 1777 – 7 January 1847) was a Scottish philosopher who published two philosophical books, one in 1824 and one in 1827. According to Robert Blakey, in her entry in his History of the Philosophy of the Mind, she exercised considerable influence over the Edinburgh philosophy of her day.

== Life ==
There is an entry in the Encyclopedia of Women that states that not much is known about the thinker that is Lady Mary Shepherd. This highlights the problem at hand which is needing to better understand her life and its contributions, and how those contributions have helped shape the world today of philosophy and for women in science. Lady Mary Primrose was the second of five daughters of Neil Primrose, 3rd Earl of Rosebery. She was born along the Firth of Forth close to Edinburgh at Barnbougle Castle on the family estate near Dalmeny, Midlothian. Shepherd had four other siblings. Her older brother Archibald Primrose, had a successful life and eventually became a Member of Parliament and 4th Earl of Rosebery.

Mary (née Primrose) Shepherd was born in her family's Barnbougle Castle which sat in the parish of Dalmeny. Mary's experience was typical of that of a child from a wealthy and successful aristocratic Scottish family. The Primrose family split their time between two different homes or estates. One of these was in the parish of Dalmeny, another estate was located in London. Mary Shepherd had a great situation for a female who wanted to be able to focus on her own thoughts, and truly analyze the world around her as well as within her own mind. This is true because she lived with her family in Dalmeny until the age of 30. As previously stated, because she grew up in a family of wealth and money was never an issue, which also during that time period, was rarely a problem for aristocratic Scottish families. While her brothers went to school, she instead was taught at home by a tutor. The Primrose family had large economic and social standing, this status allowed Mary to study under a private tutor named Mr. Pillans. Her tutor, Mr. Pillans, actually offered a much more difficult education, that he was also able to personalize and create a structure just for Shepherd. This difference in intensity helped to pique her interest in philosophy even more. In her daughters memoir, it states how thankful Mary was for Mr. Pillans and how much of an influence he had on her during the early part of her childhood.

The help and education she received from Mr. Pillans persuaded her to develop her interest in Philosophy. Mr. Pillans taught subjects such as history, mathematics, geography, and Latin. She was never forced to follow a subject that she did not enjoy, which allowed her to develop a passion on her own.

This is from a letter written by Mary herself to Charles Babbage that further sheds light on the topic. “I can truly say that from a very early age, I have examined my thought, as to its manner of reasoning in numbers; and from time to time have applied such notices to other reasonings, either for amusement or improvement; — indeed chiefly in order to chastise the vague, illusory, illogical method of reasoning admitted with every part of discourse, whether gay, or serious, & into each department of literature however important its object.” -Lady Mary Shepherd

Not only did the children of the Primrose family have access to large sums of money and other obvious luxuries of wealth, but they also had access to a large personal library. Not only was this library vast, but it existed in a time and place that had a climate which was conducive to learning and growing mentally. Apparently she took full advantage of this library says her daughter with this quote. “…once took out of one pocket a volume of Milton, and out of the other Pope’s translation of the Odyssey. After a time he took hold of her chin and, while turning her head, said in a kind of melting voice, ‘Child, thee needn’t keep at books whilst we’re traveling — does your mother put such strict orders on you?” (Brandreth 1886, p. 33). This quote goes to show how much passion and force Lady Mary Shepherd must have felt for learning. This was an indicator of scholarly things to come in her life.

She lived with her family for most of her life until she married an English barrister, Henry John Shepherd (1783–1855), in 1808 at the age of 30. She relocated with her new husband to London and they resided there for the rest of their lives. She was older than expected for a woman to be getting married, but did not settle for a man older than her as Henry was only 25 at the time of marriage. Henry did not have the same burning passion for philosophy that Mary had but was rather interested in drama. For example: The Countess of Essex, A Tragedy was a play written by Henry however, it was possibly never even produced. Their differing interests did not get in the way of their marriage as Mary actually enjoyed the freedom she had compared to other women in that time period. Some people found their marriage to be weird due to Mary putting her career first and Henry not having an issue with it.

The Shepherds had a total of three children, two daughters and one son. Their first child, Mary Elizabeth Shepherd was born the same year Mary and Henry got married, 1808. Next came their son Henry Primrose Shepherd in 1814, and finally their second daughter, Maria Charlotte Shepherd in 1815. Out of all their children, Mary Elizabeth had the most success in her life as she was actually the one who wrote the memoir explaining her mothers life. Sadly, their other children did not follow their older siblings due to health issues. Maria Charlotte only lived to the age of 15 and Henry John dealt with health issues from a young age.

The possibility of an affair between Mary Shepherd and James Bandinel is revealed in the Bandinel Family Papers in a section written by James's niece, Julia Le Mesurier, to her aunt. Julia divulged the following information in her letter, “when at [?Yundimoor], uncle James (James Bandinel) told my sisters that Lady Mary Shepherd wanted to run off with him, but he said, ‘No, Mary, we are very well as we are. Why cannot we go on so?’ She was so angry with his refusal that she quite quarreled with him & would not see him” (Project Vox Team, 2021).

Although Shepherd's philosophical books only appeared in the 1820s, a memoir by her daughter indicates that their composition in fact predated her marriage. In the first, an essay on the relation between cause and effect, she criticized the views of David Hume, Thomas Brown and the physiologist William Lawrence. In her second book of essays, on the perception of an external universe, she argued against both the idealism of George Berkeley and Thomas Reid's epistemological reliance on natural instinct.

Shepherd's correspondence shows a continuing interest in philosophical questions. A private philosophical controversy with the amateur philosopher John Fearn over the relation between perception and physical extension was published in Parriana (1828). John Fearn called Shepherd "philosophic Lady." After learning of its publication, Shepherd wrote in defense of her position in Fraser's.

Charlotte Nooth dedicated her 1816 novel, Eglantine, to Shepherd.

Mary Shepherd died at the age of 69 in 1847 in Hyde Park in London, but not before leaving an everlasting legacy in the world of philosophy. Charles Lyell and William Whewell recognized and described Shepherd as an ‘unanswerable logician, in whose argument it was impossible to find loophole or flaw’ according to her daughter, Mary Elizabeth. Whewell regarded Shepherd so highly as to teach his students at Cambridge implementing one of her works as a textbook. Shepherd maintained connections throughout the philosophical and academic world at large with other influential people at the time such as Elizabeth Barrett Browning, Mary Somerville, Sydney Smith, and Thomas Malthus.

She was known for her research, writings, and her influence on others within her social groups. Shepherd was known to have a small, close-knitted group of intellectuals that she shared constant ideas with. She influenced her friends like Charles Babbage with mathematics, David Ricardo with economics, and even Samuel Taylor Coleridge with his poetry. She played such an influential role on so many people outside of the philosophical world, as well as in it.

An unpublished poem authored by Samuel Taylor Coleridge regarding Mary Shepherd remarks,

“Lady Mary Shepherd,

As restless as a Leopard

Tho‘ not so lithe and starry,

Did wait on S. T. Coleridge

To learn the extreme polar ridge

Of Metaphysic Scholarship.

With Sall Atticum corn’d

With Paper-spice-pepper’d

With Book-garnish adorn’d

Enter Lady Mary Shepherd

Imbued with a taste for

Prose, poesy, paste

Metaphysics to lull her

Polemics

But what’s that to you?

She is a desperate Scholar

Like the heavens, deep blue!” (Project Vox Team, 2021).

Mary Shepherd describes how her inclination and passion for philosophical thinking is derived from her academic and intellectual upbringing in a letter she wrote to Charles Babbage stating, “I can truly say that from a very early age, I have examined my thought, as to its manner of reasoning in numbers; and from time to time have applied such notices to other reasonings, either for amusement or improvement; — indeed chiefly in order to chastise the vague, illusory, illogical method of reasoning admitted with every part of discourse, whether gay, or serious, & into each department of literature however important its object,” (Project Vox Team, 2021).

“…the mind strives, if possible, to find the very essences of things from the bare comparison of the relations of its ideas: for, although we be philosophers enough to know it is impossible to do so, we are for ever endeavoring to catch at, and yet for ever disappointed at not meeting with, those essences.” —Lady Mary Shepherd, in Fraser’s Magazine for Town and Country (1832, 708).

== Works ==
- An Essay upon the Relation of Cause and Effect, controverting the Doctrine of Mr. Hume, concerning the Nature of the Relation; with Observations upon the Opinions of Dr. Brown and Mr. Lawrence, connected with the same subject, 1824
- Essays on the Perception of an External Universe and other Subjects Connected with the Doctrine of Causation, 1827
- 'Observations of Lady Mary Shepherd on the "First Lines of the Human Mind"', in Parriana: or Notices of the Rev. Samuel Parr, L.L.
- 'Lady Mary Shepherd's Metaphysics', Fraser's Magazine, Vol. 5, No. 30 (July 1832), pp. 697–708.
- (Mistakenly attrib.)Enquiry respecting the Relation of Cause and Effect: in which the Theories of Professors Brown, and Mr. Hume, are Examined; with a Statement of Such Observations as are Calculated to Shew the Inconsistency of these Theories; and from which a New Theory is Deduced, More Consonant to Facts and Experience. Also a New Theory of the Earth, Deduced from Geological Observations (Edinburgh: James Ballantyne, 1819)
