= Ferns (disambiguation) =

Ferns are plants of the class Polypodiopsida.

Ferns may also refer to:

- Ferns, County Wexford, Ireland, a small historic town
- Roman Catholic Diocese of Ferns, south-east Ireland
- Alex Ferns (born 1968), Scottish actor and media personality
- Lyndon Ferns (born 1983), South African retired swimmer, former world record holder
- Rube Ferns (1873–1952), American boxer, world welterweight champion

== See also ==
- Bishop of Ferns and Leighlin (Church of Ireland)
- Bishop of Ossory, Ferns and Leighlin (Church of Ireland)
- Ferns Inquiry, an Irish government inquiry into allegations of clerical sexual abuse in the Irish Catholic Diocese of Ferns
- Fern (disambiguation)
