= Nicholas Vansittart, 1st Baron Bexley =

British politician

The Right Honourable The Lord Bexley PC FRS FSA
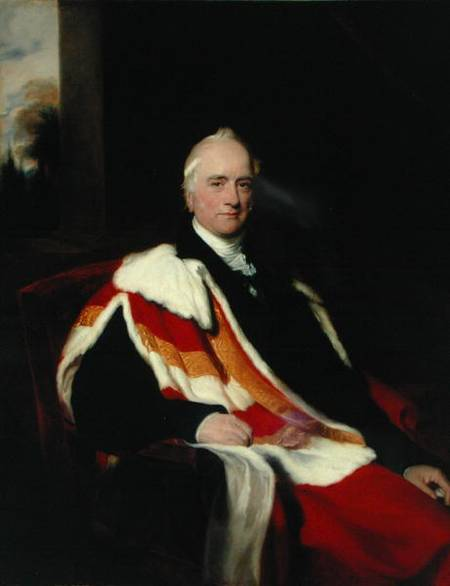
- Portrait by Sir Thomas Lawrence

Chancellor of the Exchequer
- In office 12 May 1812 – 31 January 1823
- Monarchs: George III; George IV
- Prime Minister: The Earl of Liverpool
- Preceded by: Spencer Perceval
- Succeeded by: F. J. Robinson

Chancellor of the Duchy of Lancaster
- In office 13 February 1823 – 26 January 1828
- Monarch: George IV
- Prime Minister: The Earl of Liverpool; George Canning; Viscount Goderich
- Preceded by: Charles Bathurst
- Succeeded by: The Earl of Aberdeen

Personal details
- Born: 29 April 1766 Bloomsbury, Middlesex, England
- Died: 8 February 1851 (aged 84) Foots Cray, Kent, England
- Party: Tory
- Spouse(s): Catherine Isabella Eden (1778–1810)
- Education: Christ Church, Oxford

Nicholas Vansittart, 1st Baron Bexley, PC, FRS, FSA (29 April 1766 – 8 February 1851) was an English politician, and one of the longest-serving Chancellors of the Exchequer in British history.

== Background and education ==
The fifth son of Henry Vansittart (died 1770), the Governor of Bengal, Vansittart was born in Bloomsbury, Middlesex, and raised in Bray, Berkshire. Educated at Christ Church, Oxford, he took his degree in 1787, and was called to the bar at Lincoln's Inn. From the early 1770s he was living with his mother at 60 Crooms Hill, Greenwich.

== Political career ==
Vansittart began his public career by writing pamphlets in defence of the administration of William Pitt, especially on its financial side, and in May 1796 became Member of Parliament for Hastings, retaining his seat until July 1802, when he was returned for Old Sarum. In February 1801 he was sent on a diplomatic errand to Copenhagen, and shortly after his return was appointed joint Secretary to the Treasury, a position which he retained until the resignation of Henry Addington's ministry in April 1804. Owing to the influence of his friend, the Duke of Cumberland, he became Chief Secretary for Ireland under Pitt in January 1805, resigning his office in the following September. With Addington, now Viscount Sidmouth, he joined the government of Charles James Fox and Lord Grenville as Secretary to the Treasury in February 1806, leaving office with Sidmouth just before the fall of the ministry in March 1807.

During these and the next few years Vansittart's reputation as a financier was gradually rising. In 1809 he proposed and carried without opposition in the House of Commons thirty-eight resolutions on financial questions, and only his loyalty to Sidmouth prevented him from joining the cabinet of Spencer Perceval as Chancellor of the Exchequer in October 1809. He opposed an early resumption of cash payments in 1811, and became Chancellor of the Exchequer when the Earl of Liverpool succeeded Perceval in May 1812. Having forsaken Old Sarum, he had represented Helston from November 1806 to June 1812; and after being member for East Grinstead for a few weeks, was returned for Harwich in October 1812.

== Chancellor of the Exchequer ==
When Vansittart became Chancellor of the Exchequer the country was burdened with heavy taxation and an enormous debt. Nevertheless, the continuance of the Napoleonic Wars compelled him to increase the customs duties and other taxes, and in 1813 he introduced a complicated scheme for dealing with the sinking fund. In 1816, after the conclusion of peace, a large decrease in taxation was generally desired, and there was an outcry when the Chancellor proposed only to reduce, not to abolish, the property or income tax. The abolition of this tax, however, was carried in parliament, and Vansittart was also obliged to remit the extra tax on malt, meeting a large deficiency principally by borrowing. He devoted considerable attention to effecting real or supposed economies with regard to the national debt. He carried an elaborate scheme for handing over the payment of naval and military pensions to contractors, who would be paid a fixed annual sum for forty-five years; but no one was found willing to undertake this contract, although a modified plan on the same lines was afterwards adopted.

Vansittart became very unpopular in the country, and he resigned his office in December 1822. His system of finance was severely criticised by William Huskisson, Tierney, Brougham, Hume and Ricardo. On his resignation Liverpool offered Vansittart the post of Chancellor of the Duchy of Lancaster. Accepting this offer in February 1823, he was raised to the peerage as Baron Bexley, of Bexley in the County of Kent, in March, and granted a pension of £3000 a year. He resigned in January 1828. In the House of Lords, Bexley took very little part in public business, although he introduced the Spitalfields Weavers Bill in 1823, and voted for Catholic Emancipation in 1824. He took a good deal of interest in the British and Foreign Bible Mission, the Church Missionary Society and kindred bodies, funded Kenyon college and seminary on the US western frontier (the seminary is now named Bexley Hall in his honour) and assisted in founding King's College London. He was elected a Fellow of the Royal Society in 1822. He was also one of the vice-presidents of the American Colonization Society, whose aim was to repatriate African freedmen in the United States to the African continent.

== Family ==
Lord Bexley married Catherine Isabella (1778–1810), daughter of William Eden, 1st Baron Auckland, in July 1806. He withdrew from public life in the spring of 1809 to take her on rest cures at Malvern and Torquay. The marriage was childless. He died at Foots Cray, Kent, on 8 February 1851. As he had no issue the title became extinct on his death.

Coat of arms of Nicholas Vansittart, 1st Baron Bexley
Crest An eagle's head, couped at the neck, between two wings elevated and displayed sable, the whole resting on two crosses patée argent. Escutcheon Ermine, an eagle displayed sable, on a chief gules a ducal coronet or between two crosses patée argent. Supporters Dexter, a horse regardant argent, gorged with a ducal coronet or; and pendent therefrom by a gold chain, a shield sable, charged with an ostrich feather argent, quilled and escrolled, gold (allusive to the badge or cognizance of John of Gaunt, duke of Lancaster). Sinister, an eagle regardant, wings elevated and displayed sable, gorged with a ducal coronet, and pendent therefrom a portcullis or. Motto GRATA QUIES (Grateful Repose)

== Legacy ==
The Australian explorer Phillip Parker King named one of the bays on the coast of Kimberley in Western Australia "Vansittart Bay" after Lord Bexley.

== Archives ==
There are nine volumes of Vansittart's papers in the British Library.

Political offices
Preceded by Charles Long	Secretary to the Treasury (junior); 1801–1802	Succeeded by John Sargent
Preceded by John Hiley Addington	Secretary to the Treasury (senior); 1802–1804	Succeeded by William Huskisson
Preceded by Sir Evan Nepean, Bt	Chief Secretary for Ireland; 1805	Succeeded by Charles Long
Preceded by William Huskisson	Secretary to the Treasury (senior); 1806–1807	Succeeded by William Huskisson
Preceded by Spencer Perceval	Chancellor of the Exchequer; 1812–1823	Succeeded by F. J. Robinson
Preceded by Charles Bathurst	Chancellor of the Duchy of Lancaster; 1823–1828	Succeeded by The Earl of Aberdeen
Parliament of Great Britain
Preceded by John Stanley; Robert Dundas	Member of Parliament for Hastings; 1796–1801; With: Sir James Sanderson, Bt 1796–1798; William Sturges 1798–1801	Succeeded by Parliament of the United Kingdom
Parliament of the United Kingdom
Preceded by Parliament of Great Britain	Member of Parliament for Hastings; 1801–1802; With: William Sturges 1801–1802	Succeeded by The Lord Glenbervie; George William Gunning
Preceded by George Hardinge; John Horne Tooke	Member of Parliament for Old Sarum; 1802–1812; With: Henry Alexander 1802–06; The Lord Blayney 1806–07; Josias Porcher from 1807	Succeeded by Josias Porcher; James Alexander
Preceded by Viscount Primrose; Sir John Shelley, Bt	Member of Parliament for Helston; 1806–1807; With: John de Ponthieu	Succeeded by John de Ponthieu; Thomas Brand
Preceded by Charles Ellis; George Gunning	Member of Parliament for East Grinstead; 1812; With: Charles Ellis	Succeeded by George Gunning; James Stephen
Preceded by John Hiley Addington; William Huskisson	Member of Parliament for Harwich; 1812–1823; With: John Hiley Addington 1812–1818; Charles Bathurst 1818–1823	Succeeded by George Canning; J. C. Herries
