= USS Fern (1871) =

Gunboat of the United States Navy

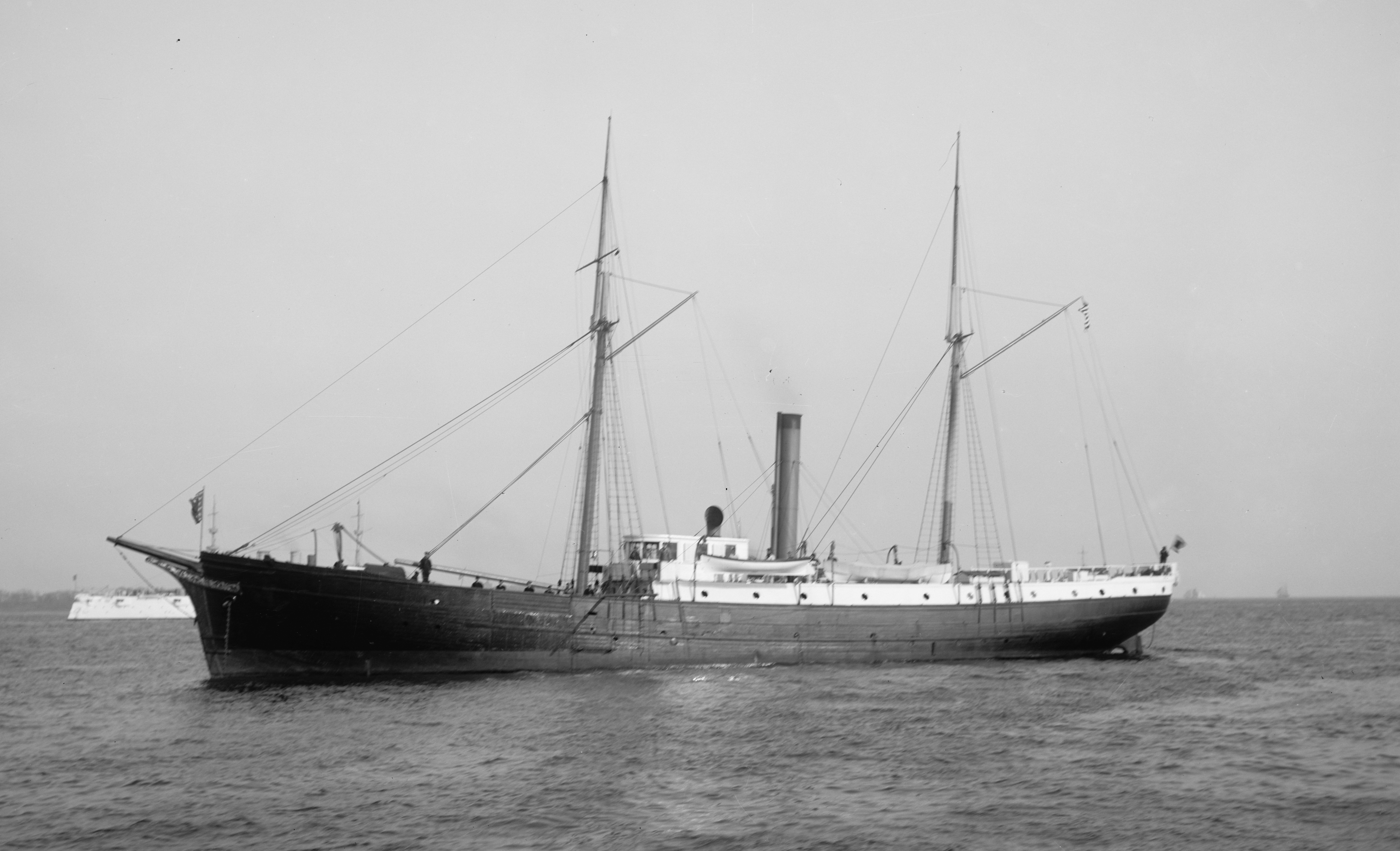
- Fern at anchor

History

United States
- Name: USLHT Fern
- Operator: U.S. Lighthouse Service
- Builder: Thomas Stack
- Launched: 1871
- Identification: Signal letters G.V.L.K
- Fate: Transferred to the Navy, 30 January 1891

United States
- Name: USS Fern, 1891-1905; USS Gopher, 1905-1923
- Operator: U.S. Navy, 1891-1898; Washington, D.C. Naval Militia, 1898-1904; Minnesota Naval Militia, 1904-1917; U.S. Navy, 1917-1919; Ohio Naval Militia, 1919-1923
- Commissioned: 22 April 1891
- Identification: Call sign NGX, NYY
- Fate: Sank, 21 August 1923

General characteristics as built in 1871
- Displacement: 840 long tons (850 t)
- Length: 160 ft (49 m)
- Beam: 28 ft (8.5 m)
- Draft: 11 ft 9 in (3.58 m)
- Speed: 9 kn (10 mph; 17 km/h)
- Complement: 12

USLHT Fern was built for the United States Lighthouse Service in New York in 1871. Her primary mission was to supply lighthouses along the Atlantic and Gulf Coasts with fuel for their lights and provisions for their keepers. Over her two-decade career, the Lighthouse Service outgrew her capacity and she was replaced by a supply vessel twice her size.

in 1891 the ship was transferred to the United States Navy and commissioned as USS Fern. During her first five years with the Navy she served primarily as a freighter moving equipment and supplies between the naval shipyards on the Atlantic Coast.

In 1896 Fern was assigned to the North Atlantic Squadron and was used to bring supplies to the combatant ships in the squadron. In 1898 when the Spanish-American War broke out she was the second Navy ship to reach Havana after the sinking of USS Maine. Fern played a small but notable part in the Navy's operations in Cuba during the war.

The ship spent the remainder of her naval career as a training ship. She was renamed USS Gopher when she was assigned to the Minnesota Naval Militia in 1905. She sank in a gale while under tow in 1923.

== Construction and characteristics ==
In 1870 there was only one lighthouse tender to maintain all the buoys and lighthouses on the west coast of the United States, USLHT Shubrick. Consequently, the Lighthouse Service was obliged to charter commercial vessels to do much of its work. The United States Congress appropriated $90,000 for a lighthouse tender for the 13th Lighthouse District, which then included Oregon and Washington, on 15 July 1870. The expectation of the Lighthouse Board was that the new tender would lower its costs by reducing charter expenses.

Fern was built at the shipyard of Thomas Stack which was located at the foot of North 6th Street in the Williamsburg section of Brooklyn, New York. Her hull was constructed of white oak and cedar. She was 160 feet (49 m) long overall, and 155 feet (47 m) long on the waterline. Her beam was 27.3 feet (8.3 m), her full-load draft was 11.75 feet (3.58 m), and her depth of hold was 13 feet (4.0 m). Her gross tonnage was 548.64. She displaced 840 tons, with a normal coal supply aboard. Her coal bunkers could hold 80 tons.

Fern had a single propeller which was powered by an inverted compound steam engine with a nominal 300 horsepower. The engine's two cylinders had diameters of 36 and 22 inches with a stroke of 34 inches. Her engine was designed by Charles W. Copeland and built by DeLameter Iron Works. Steam for the engine was provided by a coal-fired boiler. She was capable of cruising at 9 knots.

The ship had two masts. The foremast could set a couple of jibs, a square-rigged topsail and a gaff-rigged foresail. Her mainmast could set sails fore and aft as well as a gaff-rigged topsail.

Her naval complement in May 1891 was 7 officers and 45 men.

The Lighthouse Service named its tenders for plants. Fern was named for the Fern, a class of vascular plants. She was the first of two ships of that name in the Lighthouse Service, the second USLHT Fern being launched in 1915. Both these lighthouse tenders were transferred to the United States Navy during portions of their careers. They were predated in the Navy by another USS Fern, a tugboat that was in service during the Civil War.

== Service history ==
=== United States Lighthouse Service (1871–1891) ===
Fern sailed from New York on 21 December 1871 for San Francisco. The trip via the Strait of Magellan took 87 days including stops in Rio de Janeiro, Brazil, and Callao, Peru. At her new station, Fern made several trips along the California coast between San Francisco and San Diego. Among the supplies she carried were men and construction materials for a fog signal at Point Reyes.

She spent only nine months on the west coast before she was ordered back to the Atlantic. Her return to the east coast was driven by the need to replace USLHT Guthrie, which was sent to support the construction of two lighthouses in Louisiana, and USLHT Pharos, which was to be sold. Fern sailed from San Francisco for New York on 18 October 1872. She arrived back in New York on 16 January 1873 having once again transited the Strait of Magellan. Fern was assigned to the 3rd Lighthouse District. Her primary role was to supply lighthouses and lightships along the Atlantic and Gulf Coasts with fuel for their lamps, as well as food, heating fuel, and other supplies for the lighthouse keepers. Fern would supply the northern lighthouses in New England during the ice-free summer, and the Gulf Coast installations during the winter. The ship occasionally performed other tasks such as towing lightships into harbor and placing buoys.

In the fall of 1878, Fern underwent a major refit, including the replacement of her boiler. This work was done at David Carll's shipyard on City Island in the Bronx.

Fern assisted several vessels in distress during her career with the Lighthouse Service. The schooner Jessie Irving collided with the schooner Hoffman in the fog during April 1878. Fern towed the wrecked Jessie Irving to New York. In 1888, she towed the disabled schooner Kit Carson into Vineyard Haven, Massachusetts after she went aground and damaged her rudder.

The volume of supplies which the ship was required to deliver grew substantially during her service for two reasons. First, the number of lighthouses and buoys increased as the Lighthouse Service expanded. Second, the volume of fuel required doubled as expensive lard was replaced by cheap mineral oil as the primary illuminant. In 1887 Fern delivered 167,940 gallons of mineral oil, 90 tons of other supplies, 1,100 boxes of chimneys, and 1,500 other packages. She steamed 11,500 miles, consuming 650 tons of coal on the seven trips required to make these deliveries. As early as 1882 the Lighthouse Board reported that Fern was too small to handle all the freight deliveries, and suggested that Congress fund a vessel more than twice her size. It renewed this suggestion annually until 1887 when funding for a replacement supply steamer, USLHT Armeria, was authorized.

=== United States Navy (1891–1898) ===
Fern's replacement, USLHT Armeria was commissioned on 30 December 1890. No longer needed by the Lighthouse Service, Fern was transferred to the U.S. Navy on 30 January 1891. The Navy used her to carry personnel, freight, and dispatches among its shipyards and other bases on the east coast. She replaced USS Fortune, which was deemed too small for that role. Fern's naval career began with a visit to the Brooklyn Navy yard on 29 January 1891 for repairs.

She was commissioned as USS Fern on 22 April 1891 and began a career of visits between Navy installations in Portsmouth, Boston, Newport, New York, Philadelphia, Norfolk, Annapolis, and Washington, D.C. Her cargoes were quite diverse. She carried three anchors and over 600 fathoms of chain for USS Detroit and USS Montgomery. She took the guns off the USS Dolphin when she was decommissioned in 1892. She transported munitions, and a propeller for USS Raleigh. She delivered the first four self-propelled torpedoes in the fleet to USS New York in 1893.

Fern was regularly employed in the sea trials of new Navy ships to determine if they met contractual speed specifications. These included USS Columbia, USS Marblehead, USS Minneapolis, USS Ericsson, and USS Katahdin.

Fern had a number of mishaps during her naval career. She was rammed by the British tramp steamer Chicago at 3:50 am on 30 October 1891. They were ten miles off the Thimble Island Light in Chesapeake Bay at the time. Fern was hit on her port quarter, which crushed the captain's cabin and damaged her steering gear. No damage was done below the waterline and there were no injuries, so both ships were able to proceed unassisted. Fern returned to the Norfolk Naval Shipyard for repairs. The United States sued the Chicago for $3,477.65 in damages. Fern went aground at the entrance to the harbor at Annapolis, Maryland in February 1892 and again in February 1893. Fern went aground yet again in September 1892 in a fog outside of Norfolk. In March 1895 a fire broke out in the captain's cabin, near the ship's magazine where 400 pounds of smokeless powder was stored. The fire was extinguished before it reached the magazine.

In November 1895 Fern arrived at the Portsmouth Navy Yard for an extensive refit which included replacing her boiler. In April 1896, after her refit was completed, she was assigned to the North Atlantic Squadron as a dispatch boat. Her role was to carry personnel and supplies to and from the ships of the squadron. One contemporary report said she was called "the beef boat" because she delivered food to the ships of the squadron.

During this period, Fern removed several wrecks that were hazards to navigation including the British steamer Brinkburn off Fenwick Island, Delaware, and the coal barge Joel Baker off Cape May, New Jersey. In January 1898 Fern destroyed by gunfire wreck of the Norwegian barque Vasa on the Frying Pan Shoals. Her armament at the beginning of 1898 was reported to be a single 6-pounder gun.

==== Spanish-American War (1898) ====
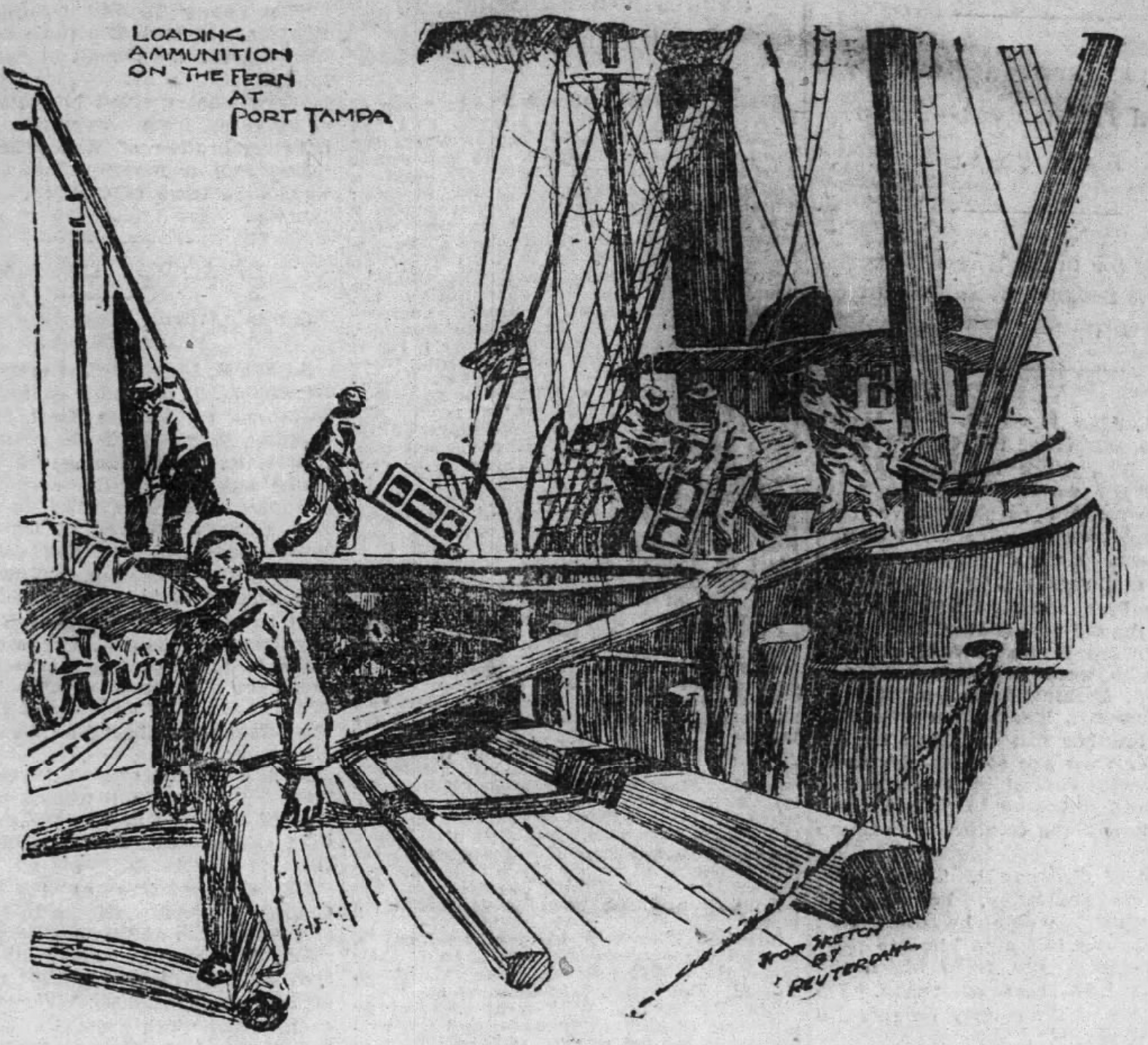
A May 1898 sketch of loading Fern with ammunition from a rail car at Tampa

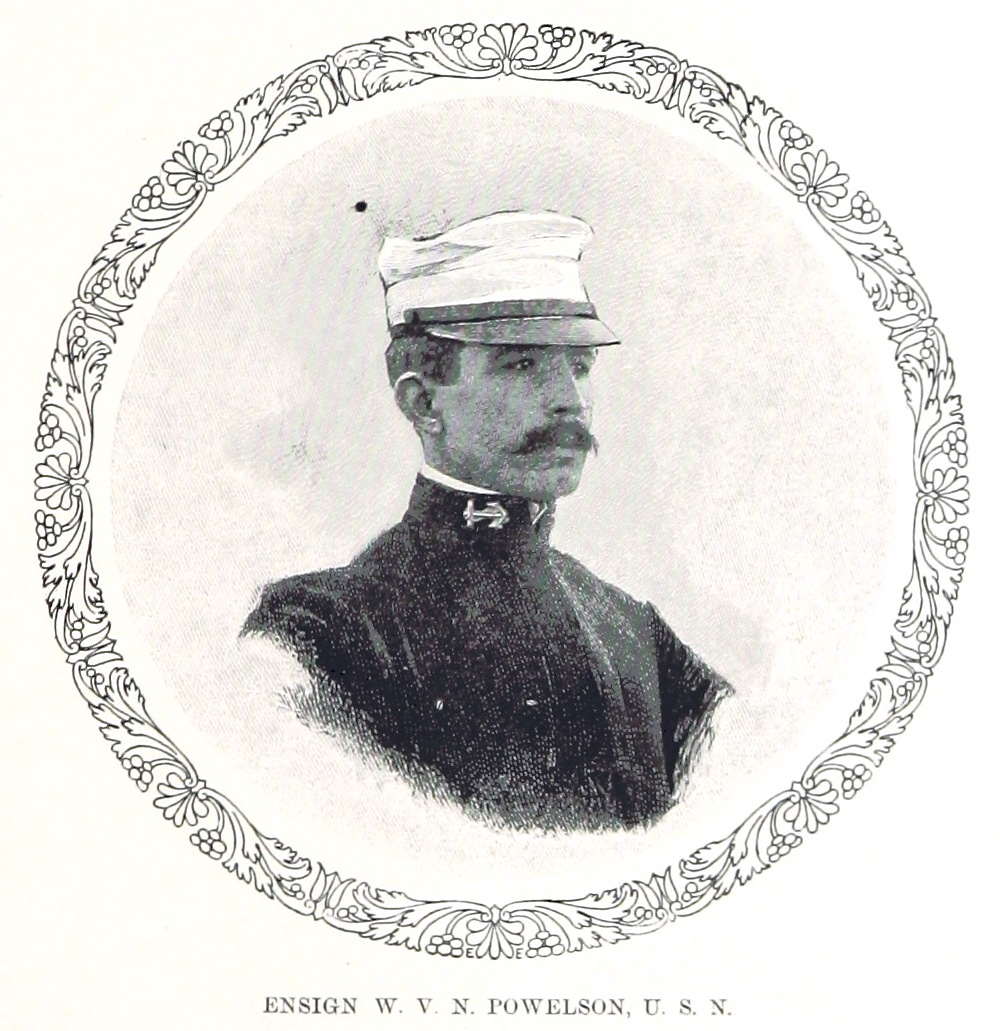
Ensign W.V.N. Powelson of Fern organized early diving and salvage efforts on USS Maine in 1898

At 2:45 am on 16 February 1898 the commandant of Naval Station Key West, Commander James A. Forsyth, received a telegram reporting the explosion of USS Maine in Havana Harbor. He dispatched to Cuba USLHT Mangrove at 3:00 am and Fern at 5:15 am. Fern reached Havana on 17 February 1898. Captain Charles Sigsbee of the Maine made his headquarters on Fern until the cruiser USS Montgomery arrived on 9 March 1898. Commander Richard Wainwright, the executive officer of Maine, also aboard Fern, was responsible for early diving and salvage efforts on the wreck, aided by Fern's Ensign W.V.N. Powelson. A variety of items recovered from the sunken battleship were brought aboard Fern. Fern left Havana the day Montgomery arrived. She sailed to Matanzas and Sagua La Grande to deliver humanitarian supplies to starving reconcentrados. Fern returned to Key West on 14 March 1898.

Sigsbee thought that Montgomery, a major combatant, might not be safe in Havana Harbor in the atmosphere of heightened emotions following the sinking of Maine, and recommended that she be ordered away. The less threatening Fern was sent back to Cuba to relieve her, and Sigsbee and his staff moved back aboard on 17 March 1898. On 6 April 1898, Lieutenant Commander William S. Cowles, captain of Fern, ordered Maine's ensign lowered for the final time. On 9 April 1898 Fern sailed from Havana with Consul General Fitzhugh Lee, effectively ending diplomacy with Cuban authorities. She arrived in Key West the next day.

On 15 April 1898 Fern embarked 80,000 pounds of powder and shells for the fleet from two rail cars at Port Tampa. Fern returned to Tampa on 23 April 1898 for another four rail car loads of ammunition which she took to Key West. Cowles was replaced there by Lieutenant Commander Herbert Winslow as captain of Fern. While Fern was loading ammunition on 25 April 1898, Congress declared war on Spain, officially beginning the Spanish-American War. She sailed for Key West, escorted by USS Annapolis, on 27 April 1898.

American troops landed on the Cuban coast near Daiquiri on 22 June 1898. The landing was successful, but a lack of small vessels to transfer troops and equipment to shore from the seagoing transports was an issue. Fern towed two barges from Key West to be used to lighter General Shafter's men and supplies ashore. On 3 July 1898 Fern and USS Resolute reached the America fleet off Santiago de Cuba towing a barge and thus both ships were present when the Battle of Santiago de Cuba took place the next day.

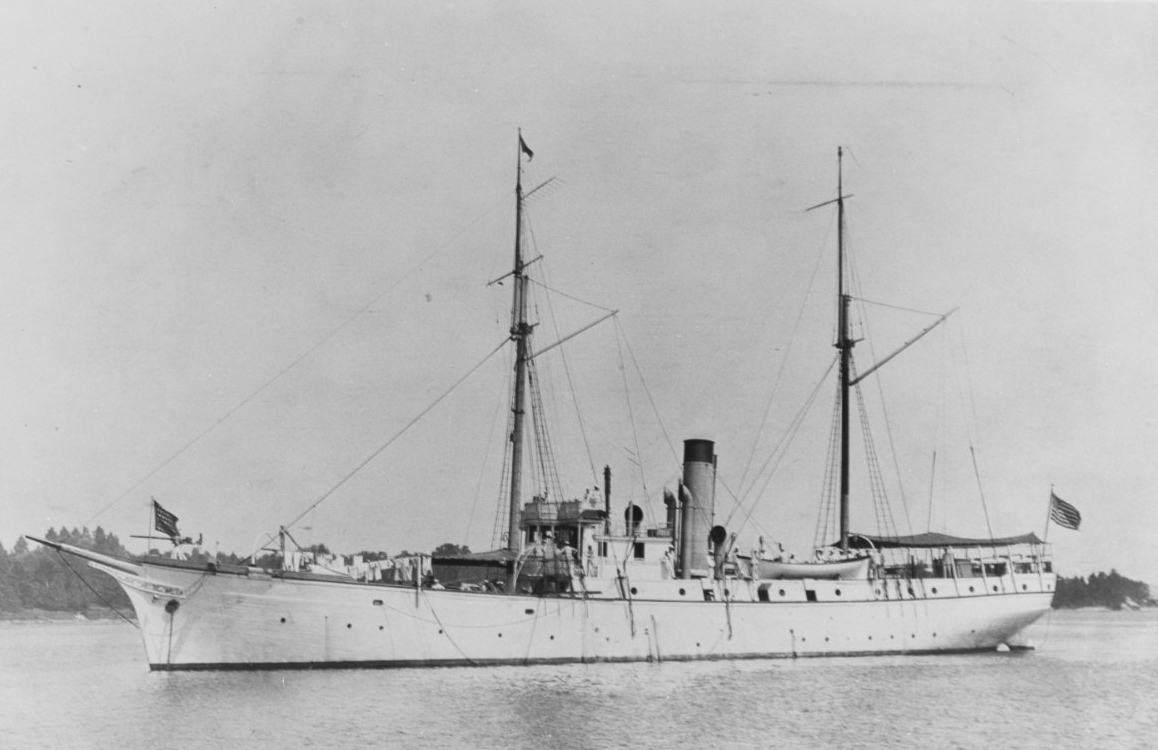
USS Fern, likely before 1905

In late June 1898 Fern was assigned to carry mail between Key West and "Postal Station No. 1" at Santiago de Cuba. One of her deliveries totalled 107 bags of mail. Her service as a mail boat continued until at least 24 August 1898 when she visited Guantanamo Bay.

Hostilities in the war came to an end on 12 August 1898. By 2 September 1898 Fern had been withdrawn from the Caribbean and was at Hampton Roads, Virginia.

=== District of Columbia Naval Militia (1898–1905) ===
At the close of hostilities with Spain, the Navy loaned a dozen small vessels which it no longer needed to state naval militias. Fern was one of these. Fern was loaned to the District of Columbia Naval Militia for use as a training ship, and decommissioned on 22 October 1898. Fern went on annual training cruises with the militia, some of which included target practice. The militia used her to break a channel through ice in the Potomac in February 1899.

=== Minnesota Naval Militia (1905–1917) ===
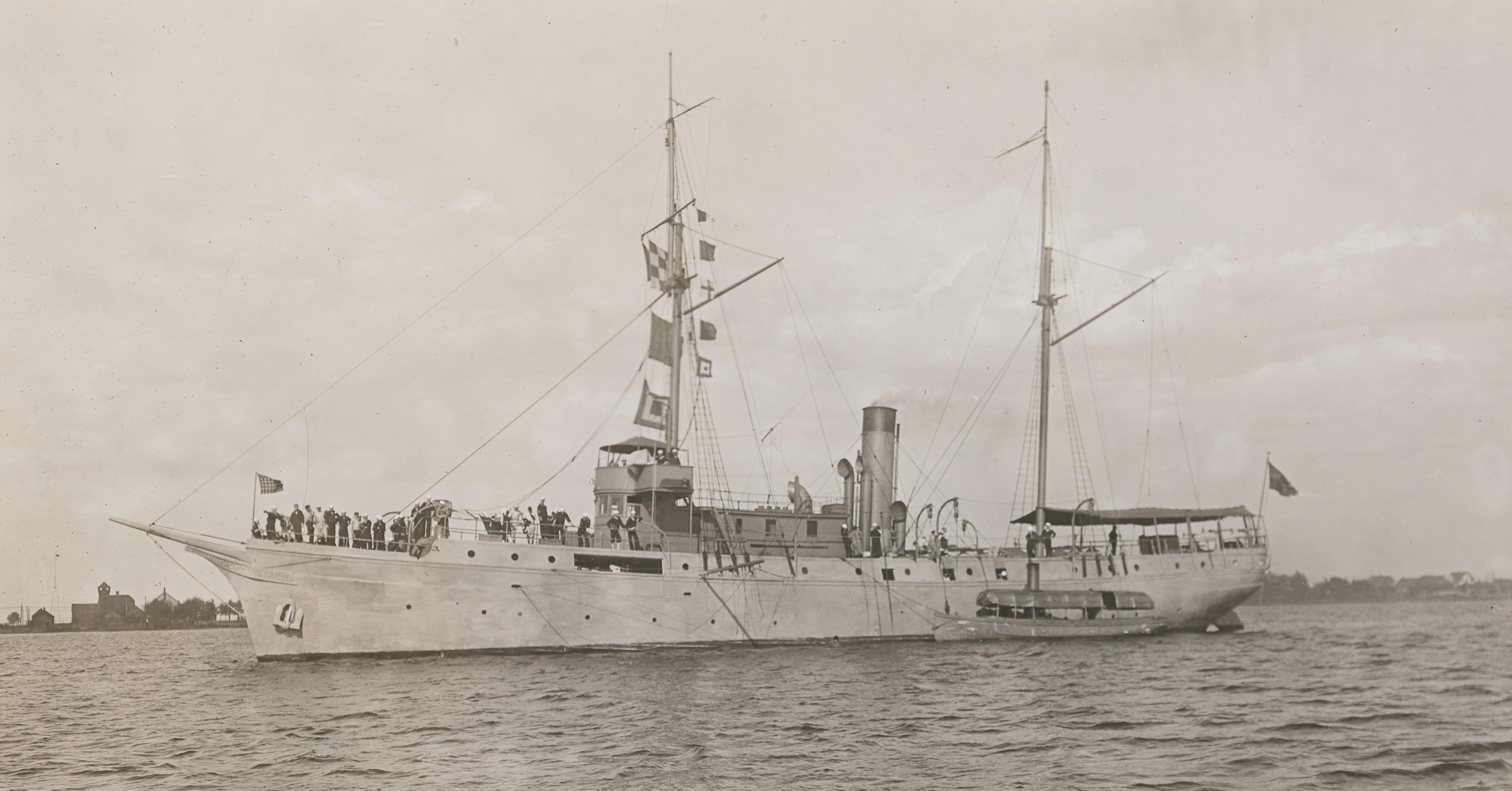
Gopher in Duluth Harbor

In February 1905 work began to transfer Fern to Duluth for use by the Minnesota Naval Militia. She was refit at the Norfolk Navy Yard and sailed for her new station on 23 July 1905. She stopped in Detroit on 10 August 1905 and sailed on the next day. Guy A. Eaton, Commander of the Minnesota Naval Reserve, reported that President Theodore Roosevelt suggested changing Fern's name to Gopher, as a nod the Minnesota as the "Gopher State". Minnesota Congressman J. Adam Bede stated that he suggested the name change to the president, who concurred. Whatever the provenance, Fern was renamed Gopher on 27 December 1905.

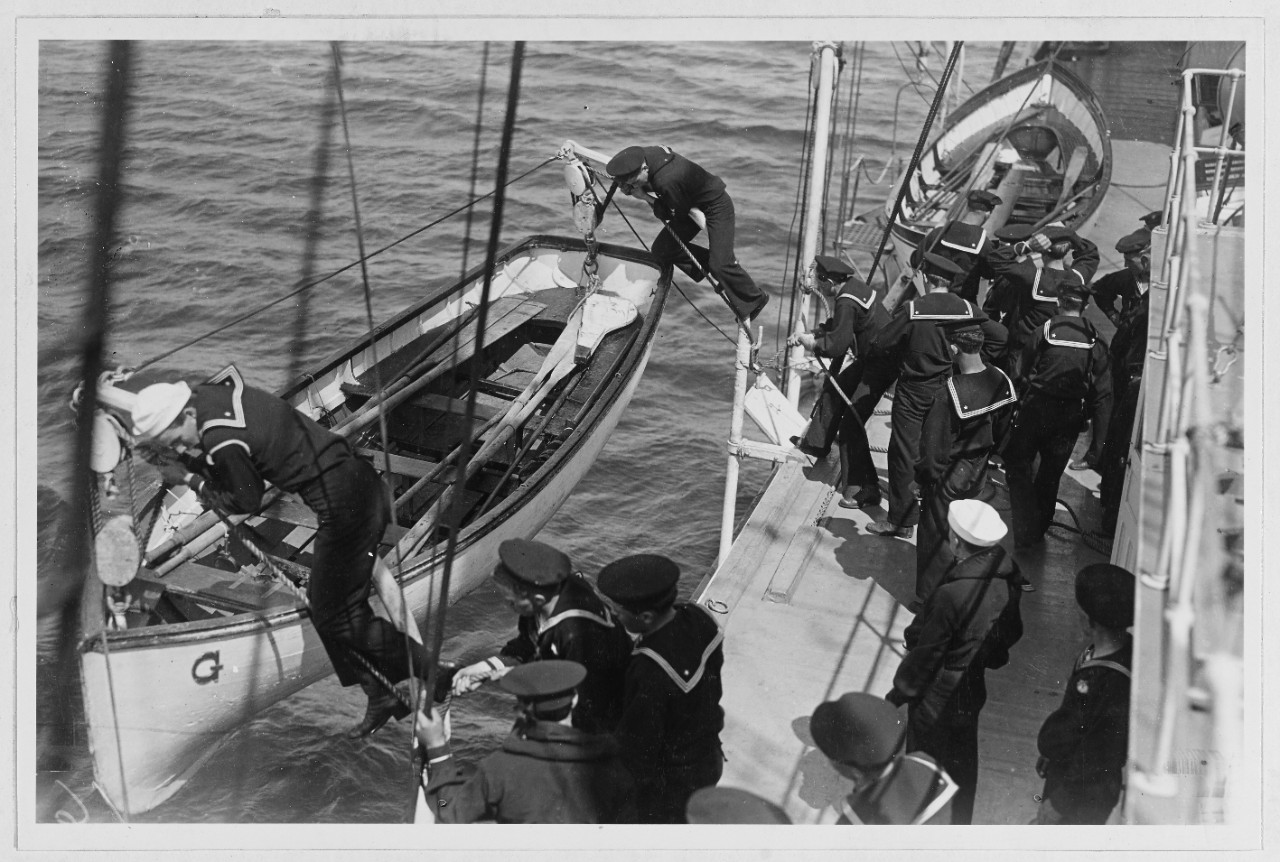
Launching one of Gopher's boats in 1906

Gopher went on regular training cruises and maneuvers with the Minnesota Naval Militia from 1905 to 1917. 1913 was a particularly busy year when the ship went to sea six times, cruising a total of 2,336 miles. She was also employed in natural disasters. Forest fires in September 1908 forced some settlements on Lake Superior to be evacuated. Gopher and her boats were able to rescue a number of refugees.

In 1909 a wireless telegraphy set was installed aboard Gopher. She was assigned the call sign NGX, and later in her career, NYY.

=== U.S Navy (1917–1919) ===
With United States entry into World War I, Gopher's white hull was repainted gray in early 1917. She was recommissioned on 30 May 1917 and was assigned duty as a practice ship at the Great Lakes Naval Training Station. She trained members of the Naval Reserve at ports in the 9th Naval District, principally Chicago, until she was placed out of commission on 19 April 1919. As at the end of the Spanish-American War, the Navy sought to dispose of many small vessels at the end of World War I, including Gopher.

=== Ohio Naval Militia (1919–1923) ===
Gopher was recommissioned on 15 May 1921 for service with the Ohio Naval Militia at Toledo, Ohio. She went on training cruises with the militia in 1921, and 1922.

== Loss of Gopher ==
On 1 October 1922, she was placed in reduced commission, and on 5 August 1923 departed for Boston. While in passage, she rammed and damaged a lock in the Soulanges Canal and was apprehended and held by the Canadian Government at Quebec. Upon her release, she was taken in tow by Wandank, but on 21 August 1923 she sank during a northwest gale in the Gulf of St. Lawrence. Gopher was later decommissioned as of the date of her sinking.
