= Benjamin Shaw (MP) =

English politician

Benjamin Shaw (c 1770 – 6 November 1843) was an English politician.

He was elected at the 1812 general election as a Member of Parliament (MP) for the rotten borough of Westbury in Wiltshire, but was not re-elected in 1818.

Parliament of the United Kingdom
Preceded by John de Ponthieu; Henry Lascelles	Member of Parliament for Westbury; 1812 – 1818; With: Benjamin Hall to 1814; Ralph Franco from 1814	Succeeded by Ralph Franco; Lord Francis Conyngham
