= Benjamin Hall (industrialist) =

British politician (1778–1817)

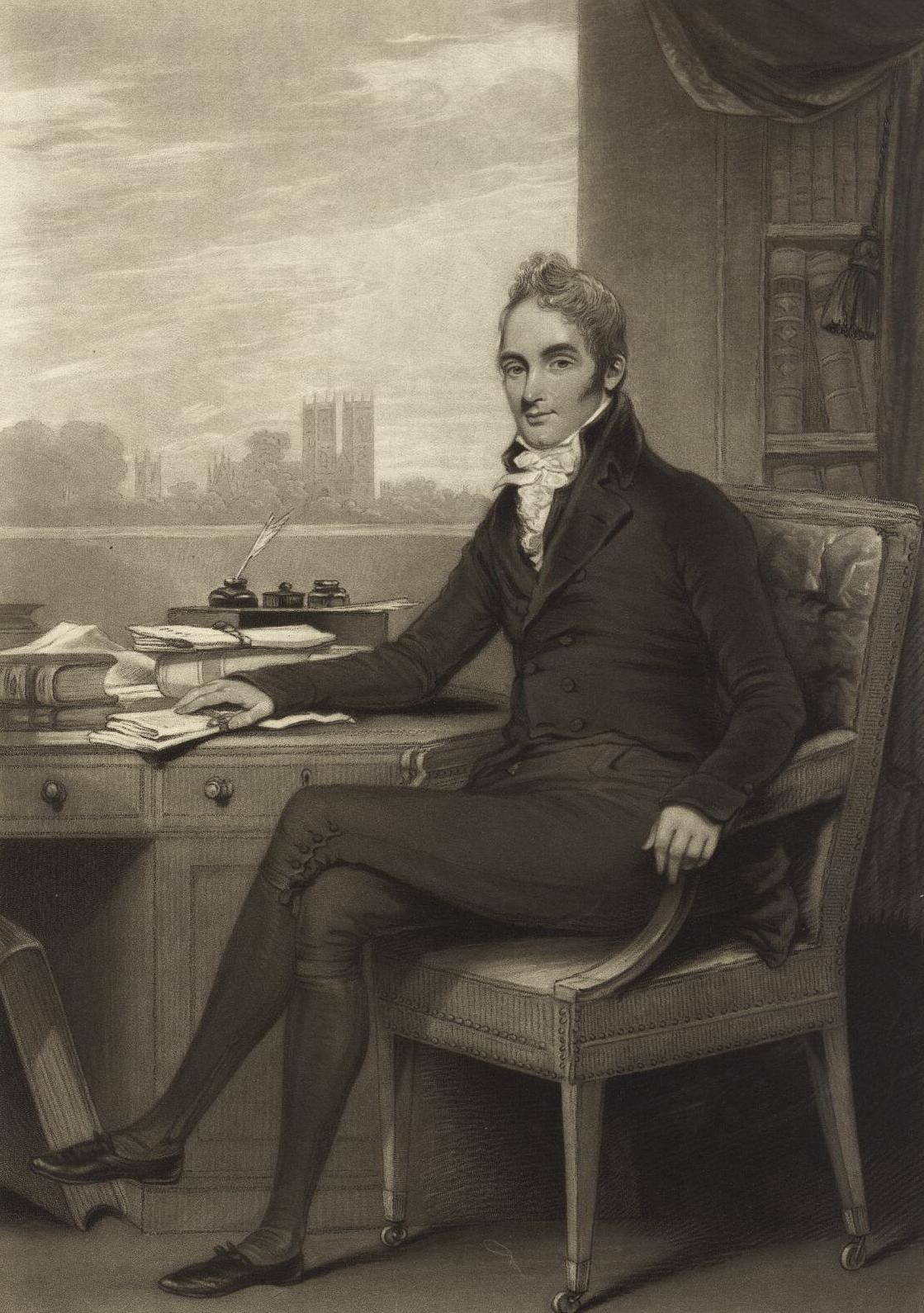
Benjamin Hall

Benjamin Hall (29 September 1778 – 31 July 1817) was an industrialist, politician and prominent figure in South Wales.

== Background, education and connections ==
Benjamin Hall was born on 29 September 1778, the eldest son of the Reverend Benjamin Hall, chancellor of the Diocese of Llandaff, and Elizabeth Grant. He was educated at Westminster School and received a Queens Scholarship to study at Christ Church, Oxford in 1794, from where he graduated with a BA in 1799 and MA in 1801. He had joined Lincoln's Inn in 1798 and was called to the bar in 1801.

In December 1801, Hall married Charlotte, the daughter of ironmaster Richard Crawshay, in what historian P. A. Symonds calls an "advantageous marriage" - her dowry was £40,000. His father-in-law made him a partner in the Cyfarthfa Ironworks in 1803 and in 1808 passed the Abercarn estate to him. This munificence was followed in 1810 with a bequest from his father-in-law of a 37.5 per cent share in the ironworks, which covered a significant amount of land and houses as well as the mine and quarry workings.

== Member of Parliament ==
Hall was the first industrialist to win a Welsh county seat in Parliament. He served as MP for Totnes in Devon from 1806 to 1812 and, after losing that seat, for Westbury in Wiltshire from 1812. In 1814, he transferred his seat to Glamorganshire, Wales until his death. He ended his association with Lincoln's Inn in 1816.

== Family and heir ==
Hall died on 31 July 1817 and a monument was erected in his memory at Llandaff Cathedral in his Glamorganshire constituency. He had bought Hensol Castle for £45,500 in 1815 to fulfil an election promise that he would own a residence in Glamorgan, some people having suggested that his personal loyalties lay with his business interests in neighbouring Monmouthshire. A year later, he sold his share in the ironworks to his brother-in-law, William Crawshay, for £90,000.

Hall and his wife had six sons and a daughter. His eldest son, Benjamin Hall, 1st Baron Llanover, a social reformer and politician who as First Commissioner of Works, oversaw the final phase of the construction of the Palace of Westminster, with "Big Ben", the largest bell in its clock tower, accordingly being named after him. Benjamin Hall senior had been called "Slender Ben" on account of his build.

Parliament of the United Kingdom
Preceded by William Adams; Vicary Gibbs	Member of Parliament for Totnes; 1806–1812; With: William Adams 1806–1811; Thomas Courtenay 1811–1812	Succeeded by Ayshford Wise; Thomas Courtenay
Preceded by Henry Lascelles; John de Ponthieu	Member of Parliament for Westbury; 1812–1814; With: Benjamin Shaw	Succeeded by Ralph Franco; Benjamin Shaw
Preceded by Thomas Wyndham	Member of Parliament for Glamorganshire; 1814–1817	Succeeded by Sir Christopher Cole
