= John de Ponthieu =

Member of Parliament for Westbury
- In office 1810–1812 Serving with Henry Lascelles
- Preceded by: Henry Lascelles; Francis Whittle
- Succeeded by: Benjamin Hall; Benjamin Shaw

Member of Parliament for Helston
- In office 1806–1807 Serving with Nicholas Vansittart, Thomas Brand
- Preceded by: Viscount Primrose; Sir John Shelley, Bt
- Succeeded by: Sir John St Aubyn, Bt; Richard Richards

Personal details
- Born: 27 April 1765
- Died: 26 April 1813 (aged 47); London, England
- Relations: Charles Wilkes (cousin)
- Parent(s): Henry de Ponthieu; Anne Sykes

John de Ponthieu (27 April 1765 – 26 April 1813) was an English politician who served as a member of parliament for Helston and Westbury.

== Early life ==
De Ponthieu was born on 27 April 1765. He was the second, but eldest surviving, son of Anne (née Sykes) de Ponthieu (d. 1817) and Henry de Ponthieu (1731–1808), a merchant and amateur naturalist. They lived at Princes Street, Bedford Row, Middlesex. His father, together with his brothers, Josias and John de Ponthieu and brother-in-law Israel Wilkes III, (Note: Israel Wilkes III (1722–1805) was a brother of John Wilkes, the radical journalist who served as MP for Aylesbury and Middlesex, High Sheriff of Buckinghamshire, Sheriff of London, and Lord Mayor of London.) was a member of the firm de Ponthieu and Wilkes.

His maternal grandparents were Anne (née Beaufils) de Ponthieu and Huguenot merchant, Josias de Ponthieu (son of Charles de Ponthieu, a refugee officer from Saintonge, and Marguerite de La Rochefoucauld). Through his aunt Elizabeth de Ponthieu, he was a first cousin of the banker Charles Wilkes.

== Career ==
De Ponthieu was educated by R. Bland in Bromley-by-Bow. A member of Bruce, de Ponthieu, Bazett & Co. until his death, he was shareholder and writer for the East India Company in Bombay in 1783, he was a factor in 1790 before becoming secretary and accountant to the Military Board in 1795. He returned to England by 1801 and succeeded to his father's estate in 1808.

De Ponthieu, like his business partners Patrick Craufurd Bruce, George Simson, and Henry Fawcett of Scaleby Castle, sought to purchase a seat in Parliament and was returned, briefly, on two different occasions. He was first returned for Helston from 1806 to 1807, as a guest of Christopher Hawkins. From 24 March 1810 until his retirement in 1812, he represented Westbury under the patronage of Lord Liverpool.

== Personal life ==
De Ponthieu, who never married, lived at 43 Portland Place, Middlesex, and acquired a residence at Esher.

He died at his home in London on 26 April 1813. He was buried at Esher with his parents. His 1803 will, which was contested by his business partners, left £20,000 to his unmarried sister Anne, who died in 1823.

== Notes ==
Parliament of the United Kingdom
Preceded by Viscount Primrose; Sir John Shelley, Bt	Member of Parliament for Helston; 1806–1807; With: Nicholas Vansittart 1806–1807; Thomas Brand 1807–1807	Succeeded by Sir John St Aubyn, Bt; Richard Richards
Preceded by Henry Lascelles; Francis Whittle	Member of Parliament for Westbury; 1810–1812; With: Henry Lascelles	Succeeded by Benjamin Hall; Benjamin Shaw
