= Henry John Shepherd =

English Member of Parliament

Member of the Parliament of England for Shaftesbury
- In office 17 June 1818 – 9 March 1820 Serving with John Bacon Sawrey Morritt

Personal details
- Born: 1784
- Died: 21 May 1855 (aged 70–71)
- Spouse: Lady Mary Shepherd
- Parent: Samuel Shepherd

Henry John Shepherd (1784 – 21 May 1855) was an English politician who served as a Member of Parliament (MP) for Shaftesbury.

== Biography ==
Henry John Shepherd was the son of the judge Samuel Shepherd. In 1808 he married Lady Mary Shepherd, the daughter of Lord Rosebury and entered Parliament for Shaftesbury on the interest of his brother-in-law.

== See also ==
- List of MPs elected in the 1818 United Kingdom general election
