= Archibald Primrose, 4th Earl of Rosebery =

British politician

Archibald John Primrose, 4th Earl of Rosebery, KT, PC, FRS (14 October 1783 – 4 March 1868), styled Viscount Primrose until 1814, was a British politician.

== Early life ==
Primrose was born on 14 October 1783. He was the eldest son of Neil Primrose, 3rd Earl of Rosebery and, his second wife, Mary Vincent. Among his siblings were Lady Charlotte Primrose (wife of Gen. Kenneth Howard, 1st Earl of Effingham) Lady Mary Shepherd, Lady Dorothea Arabella Primrose (wife of William Hervey of Bodwell Hall), and Hon. Francis Ward Primrose (who married Percy Gore).

His paternal grandparents were James Primrose, 2nd Earl of Rosebery and Mary Campbell (a daughter of the Hon. John Campbell, himself a son of the 9th Earl of Argyll, and Elizabeth Elphinstone, a daughter of the 8th Lord Elphinstone). His maternal grandparents were Sir Francis Vincent, 7th Baronet and Mary Howard (the daughter of Lt.-Gen. Hon. Thomas Howard, who served as Governor of Berwick, and Mary Moreton, the youngest daughter of William Moreton, Bishop of Meath).

He was educated at Pembroke College, Cambridge, gaining his MA in 1804.

== Career ==
He was Member of Parliament for Helston from 1805 to 1806 and Cashel from 1806 to 1807.

He succeeded to the earldom in 1814, and was created Baron Rosebery, of Rosebery in the County of Edinburgh, in the Peerage of the United Kingdom, in 1828. He was appointed a Privy Counsellor in 1831 and a Knight of the Thistle in 1840. He was a Fellow of the Royal Society.

== Personal life ==
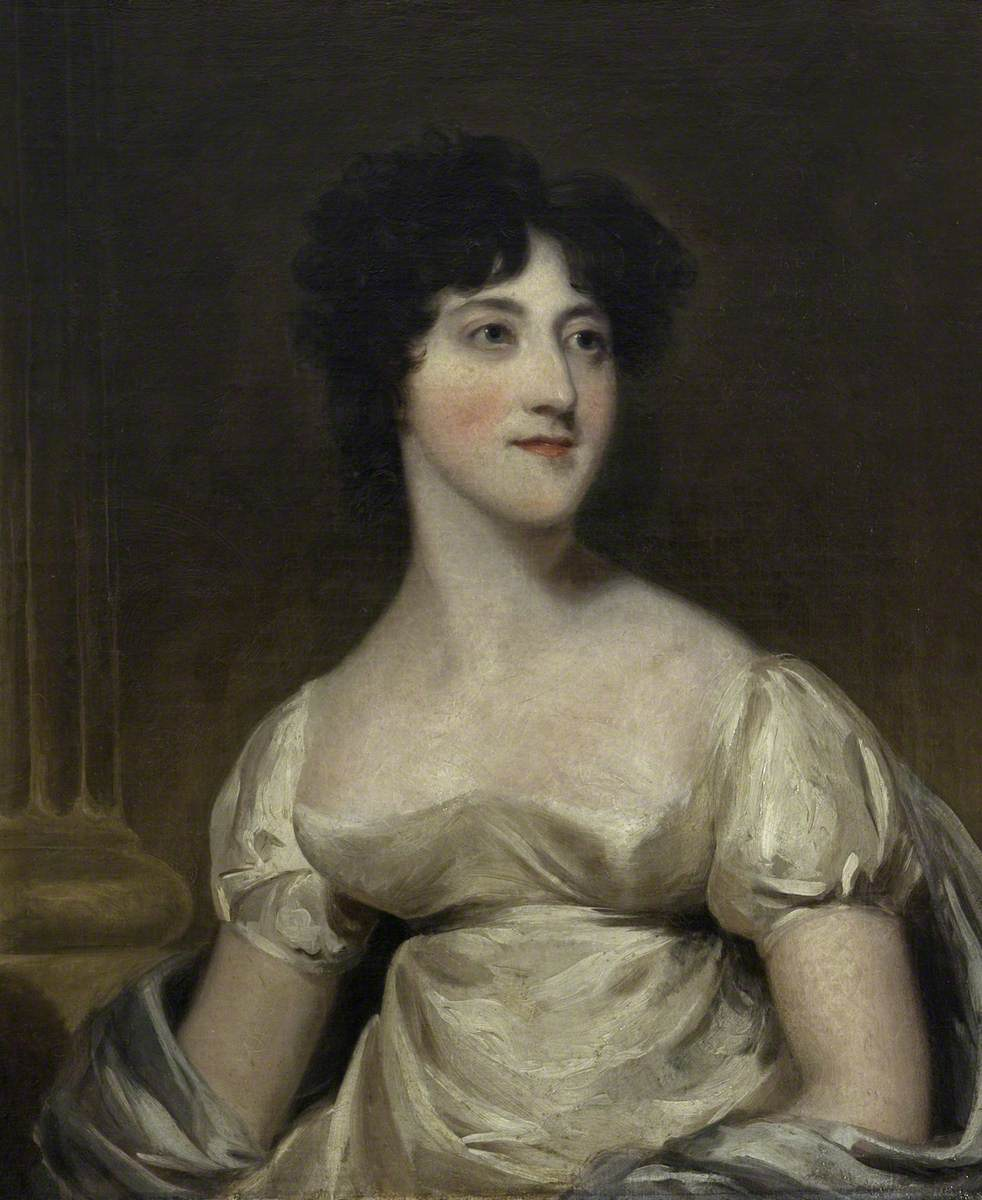
Portrait of his second wife, the former Hon. Anne Margaret Anson, by Thomas Barber, c. 1815

Lord Rosebery married firstly Harriett Bouverie (d. 1834), daughter of Hon. Bartholomew Bouverie (a son of the 1st Earl of Radnor) in 1808. Before their divorce in 1815, they had four children:

- Archibald John Primrose, Lord Dalmeny (1809–1851), MP for Stirling Burghs who married Lady Catherine Stanhope, a daughter of Philip Stanhope, 4th Earl Stanhope and Hon. Catherine Smith (a daughter of the 1st Baron Carrington), in 1843.
- Lady Harriet Primrose (1810–1876), who married Sir John Dunlop, 1st Baronet, son of Lt.-Gen. Sir James Dunlop, 21st of that Ilk, in 1835.
- Lady Mary Anne Primrose (1812–1826), who died unmarried at age 14.
- Hon. Bouverie Francis Primrose CB FRSE (1813–1898), who married Hon. Frederica Sophia Anson, daughter of Thomas Anson, 1st Viscount Anson and Lady Anne Margaret Coke (a daughter of the 1st Earl of Leicester), in 1838. Frederica was a younger sister of the 4th Earl's second wife Anne.

Lady Roseberry caused a society scandal when she had an affair with her brother-in-law, Sir Henry St John-Mildmay, 4th Baronet (the widower of her deceased sister Charlotte). She divorced Lord Rosebery and married St John-Mildmay in Stuttgart after obtaining a special permission by the King of Württemberg. Lord Roseberry then married Anne Margaret Anson (1796–1882), the eldest daughter of Thomas Anson, 1st Viscount Anson and Lady Anne Margaret Coke (a daughter of the 1st Earl of Leicester) in 1819. They had two children:

- Lady Anne Primrose (1820–1862), who married, as his third wife, the Rt. Hon. Henry Tufnell, MP for Ipswich and Devonport, in 1848.
- Lady Louisa Primrose (1822–1870), who died unmarried.

Lord Rosebery died on 4 March 1868.

=== Descendants ===
He was the grandfather of Archibald Primrose, 5th Earl of Rosebery, who succeeded him to the title of Lord Primrose and briefly served as Prime Minister of the United Kingdom from 1894 to 1895.

== Arms ==
Coat of arms of Archibald Primrose, 4th Earl of Rosebery
Crest A demi-lion gules holding in the dexter paw a primrose or. Escutcheon Quarterly: 1st and 4th, vert, three primroses within a double tressure flory counterflory or (Primrose); 2nd and 3rd, Argent, a lion rampant, double queued sable (Cressy). Supporters Two lions or. Motto Fide et fiducia (By fidelity and confidence). Orders The Most Ancient and Most Noble Order of the Thistle.

Parliament of the United Kingdom
Preceded by John Penn; Davies Giddy	Member of Parliament for Helston; 1805–1806; With: Davies Giddy 1805–1806; Sir John Shelley, Bt 1806	Succeeded by Nicholas Vansittart; John de Ponthieu
Preceded by William Wickham	Member of Parliament for Cashel; 1806–1807	Succeeded by Quintin Dick
Honorary titles
Preceded by The Earl of Hopetoun	Lord Lieutenant of Linlithgowshire; 1843–1863	Succeeded by The Earl of Hopetoun
Peerage of Scotland
Preceded by Neil Primrose	Earl of Rosebery; 1814–1868	Succeeded by Archibald Primrose
Peerage of the United Kingdom
New creation	Baron Rosebery; 1828–1868; Member of the House of Lords (1828–1868)	Succeeded by Archibald Primrose
Baronetage of Nova Scotia
Preceded by Neil Primrose	Baronet (of Carrington); 1814-1868	Succeeded by Archibald Primrose
