= Fern, Pleasants County, West Virginia =

Unincorporated community in West Virginia, United States

Fern
- Unincorporated community
- Location within the state of West Virginia Fern (the United States)
- Coordinates: 39°20′52″N 81°3′59″W
- Country: United States
- State: West Virginia
- County: Pleasants
- Elevation: 797 ft (243 m)
- Time zone: UTC-5 (Eastern (EST))
  - Summer (DST): UTC-4 (EDT)
- GNIS ID: 1678516

Fern is an unincorporated community in Pleasants County, West Virginia, United States. The Fern Post Office no longer exists.
