= Charles Fearne =

English jurist (1742–1794)

Charles Fearne (1742–1794) was an English jurist.

== Life ==
The son of Charles Fearne, judge-advocate of the Admiralty, he was born in London, and was educated at Westminster School.

Fearne adopted the legal profession, but devoted time and money to experiments: he saw a commercial application to morocco leather, and designed a musket. He died in 1794, leaving his widow and family in impecunious circumstances.

== Works ==
Fearne's 1772 work, "Essay on the Learning of Contingent Remainders and Executory Devices", is deemed to have done "more than any other to preserve the Rule in Shelley's Case as black letter law (as distinguished from a rule of construction)." His Essay on the Learning of Contingent Remainders and Executory Devises, the work which has made his reputation as a legal authority, and which passed through numerous editions, was called forth by a decision of Lord Mansfield in the case of Perrin v. Blake, and had the effect of reversing that decision.

An edition in 1797 was by his former pupil John Joseph Powell, and the Essay on the Nature and Operation of Fines and Recoveries (1783) by William Cruise was inspired by Contingent Remainders.

A volume entitled Fearne's Posthumous Works was published by subscription in 1797 for the benefit of his widow.
