= Ferne Koch =

American photographer

Ferne Koch (née Goodman; April 8, 1913 – October 13, 2001) was an American photographer.

== Education ==
Koch attended the University of Houston, where she studied photography. Later, she attended workshops taught by Richard Avedon and Edward Weston.

== Work ==
Koch's career as a photographer began in the 1940s in Paris, where she produced documentary photographs.

== Collections ==
Her work is included in the collections of the Museum of Fine Arts, Houston, the Amon Carter Museum of American Art, and the Dallas Museum of Art.

Her archives are held by Harry Ransom Center at the University of Texas at Austin. The archives contain her negatives, slides and photographic prints, as well as ephemera and printed documents.
