= USLHT Fern =

Former USLHS lighthouse tender

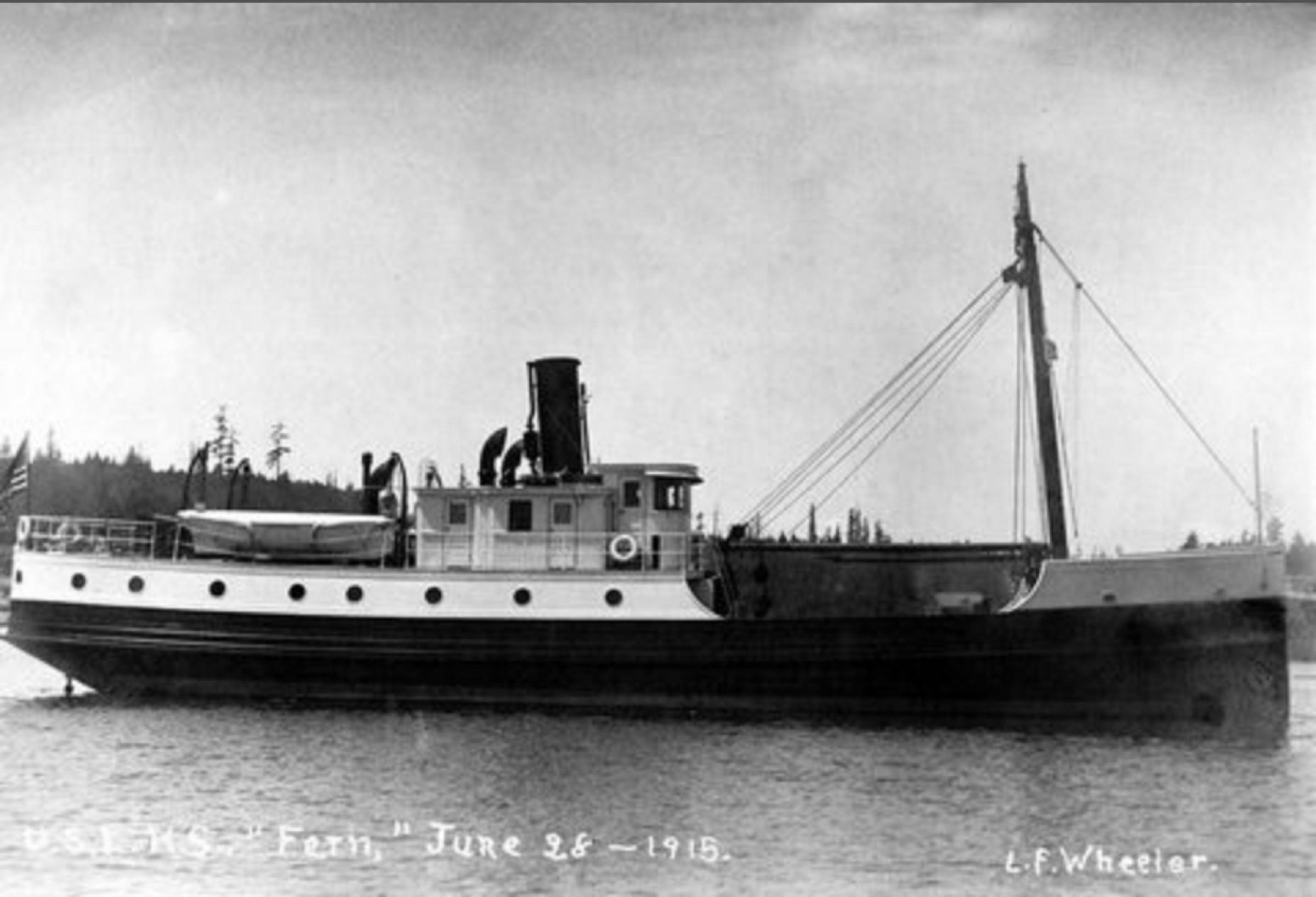
- USLHT Fern in 1915

History

United States Lighthouse Service
- Name: USLHT Fern
- Operator: U.S. Lighthouse Service 1915-1917; U.S. Navy 1917-1919; U.S. Lighthouse Service 1919-1934
- Builder: Hall Brothers Marine Railroad & Shipbuilding Co.
- Cost: $62,000
- Launched: 6 February 1915
- Commissioned: 25 June 1915
- Home port: Ketchikan, Alaska
- Identification: Radio call sign: NAFV, WWDN
- Fate: Sold in 1934 for $3,176

United States
- Name: Fern
- Identification: Official number: 234815; Radio Call Sign: WTNG
- Fate: Sold, 1940 or 1941

United States Army
- Name: S. D. Mason
- Operator: U.S. Army Corps of Engineers (1941–1943); U.S. Army Transport Service (1943–1948)
- Identification: Pennant number FS-551
- Fate: Sold, 1948 or 1949

United States
- Name: Fern 1949-1980; Northern I 1981-?
- Identification: Official number: 234815
- Fate: unknown

General characteristics as built in 1915
- Displacement: 317 tons, fully loaded
- Length: 112 ft (34 m)
- Beam: 22 ft (6.7 m)
- Draught: 8.5 ft (2.6 m)
- Installed power: 300 bhp (220 kW)
- Propulsion: 1 propeller
- Speed: 10 knots (19 km/h; 12 mph)
- Complement: 4 officers, 6 men

USLHT Fern was a lighthouse tender built for the United States Lighthouse Service in 1915. She was designed to maintain aids to navigation in the protected waters of the inside passage in Southeast Alaska. She was placed under U.S. Navy orders in World War I, but returned to Lighthouse Service control in 1919. Fern continued her work for the Lighthouse Service in Alaska until she was sold in 1934.

Her new owners employed her as a commercial freighter. Fern carried mail, food, supplies, and people along the coast of Alaska from Ketchikan to Unalaska. In the military construction boom in Alaska before and during World War II, she was first chartered and then purchased by the U.S. Army Corps of Engineers for use as a coastal freighter. The Army renamed her S. D. Mason.

After the war she was sold by the government, and renamed Fern. She served as a coastal freighter, and fishing boat until she disappears from historical records in 1981. Her ultimate fate is unknown.

== Construction and characteristics ==
Congress appropriated $200,000 for the construction of a new lighthouse tender in acts on 27 May 1908 and 4 March 1909. In a further act, on 27 July 1912, it allowed the Lighthouse Service to split this funding between two ships, and use $60,000 to acquire a smaller tender for the protected waters of the Inside Passage in Alaska.

On 1 April 1913, the Lighthouse Service opened bids for its first design for Fern. This ship was to be 80 feet (24 m) long, and powered by two gasoline engines. None of these bids was accepted.

In February 1914, the Lighthouse Service called for sealed bids to build a larger, more powerful Fern. The Lighthouse Service opened ten bids on 1 April 1914. Hall Brothers Marine Railroad & Shipbuilding Company of Winslow, Washington was the lowest. It provided two alternatives. For $62,000, it would build to the specification except that it would replace the oak hull planking, which would have to be shipped from the east, with Douglas fir, which could be obtained locally. A $59,000 bid would incorporate the same planking substitution and also substitute a cast bronze propeller for the Monel propeller called for in the specifications. In addition to making the two lowest bids, Hall Brothers had the additional advantage of proximity to Alaska, where the ship would be stationed, over the five shipyards on the East Coast and Great Lakes which bid.

Hall Brothers' $62,000 proposal was accepted by the Lighthouse Service, and a contract was signed on 17 April 1914. Her keel was laid on 11 June 1914. Fern was launched on 6 February 1915 and placed in commission on 25 June 1915.

Fern's hull was built of wood, fastened with copper. Her frames were oak, and her planking was Douglas fir. Her hull was sheathed in copper, to discourage marine growth, to a level one foot above her waterline. She was 112 feet (34 m) long overall, with a beam of 22 feet (6.7 m). Her depth of hold was 10 feet (3.0 m). Her fully loaded draft was 8.5 feet (2.6 m). Her full-load displacement was 317 tons, and her light displacement was 245 tons. In 1937, when she was used as a freighter, her gross register tonnage was 207, and her net register tonnage was 170.

Fern had a triple-expansion steam engine with high, medium, and low-pressure cylinders of 10, 17.5, and 28 inches in diameter, with a stroke of 18 inches. It generated 300 horsepower to drive a single propeller. Her engine was built by Heffernan Engine Works of Seattle. Steam for the engine was produced by an oil-fired boiler manufactured by the Almay Water Tube Boiler Company of Providence, Rhode Island. This propulsion system produced an average speed of 10 knots during her builder's trials.

Fern carried an 18-foot (5.5 m) gas launch, and a whaleboat of the same size, also built by Hall Brothers.

Her complement in 1915, when she was commissioned, was 4 officers and 6 men. Her crew quarters were considered comfortable in 1915. She had electric lights, steam heat, and running hot and cold water. The captain's quarters, on the bridge deck, had a bedroom, office, and private head. A separate stateroom with a private head on the main deck was reserved for the Inspector of the 16th Lighthouse District, for whenever he chose to travel with the ship. There were separate dining rooms for the officers and men. The men were berthed in the forecastle, while the officers had staterooms on the main deck aft.

United States lighthouse and buoy tenders were traditionally named for plants. Fern's namesake was the Fern, a large group of vascular plants which are common in Southeast Alaska where she spent her government career. She was the second of three tenders to bear the name. The first Fern was a lighthouse tender launched in 1871, and the third Fern was an ice-breaking river tender launched in 1942.

== U.S. government service (1915–1934) ==
=== U.S. Lighthouse Service (1915—1917) ===
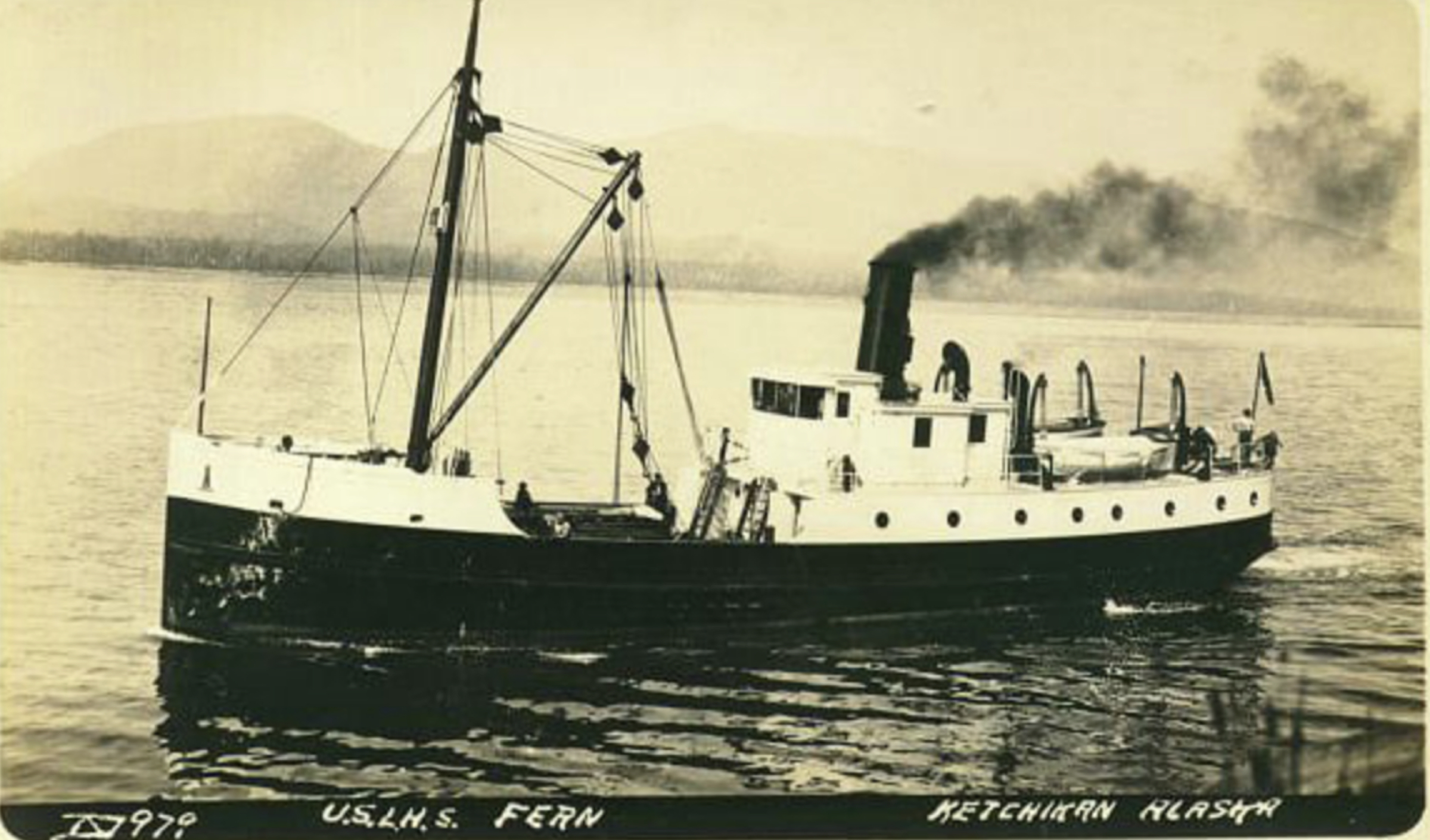
USLHT Fern at Ketchikan

Fern was assigned to the 16th Lighthouse District, and spent most of her government career working in the protected waters of Southeast Alaska. She arrived in Ketchikan, her homeport, for the first time on 4 July 1915, having steamed from Seattle in 69 hours. Her primary mission was building and maintaining aids to navigation, and supplying the remote lighthouses of her area with food, fuel, and personnel. Although she burned oil for fuel, she regularly took on coal to distribute to the lighthouses.

Fern had her major maintenance done in Seattle, typically during the winter when the weather was too rough for the ship to work on her buoys in Alaska.

=== United States Navy (1917–1919) ===
The United States entered World War I on 6 April 1917. President Woodrow Wilson issued executive order 2588 on 11 April 1917 transferring a number of lighthouse tenders to the War Department and Navy Department. Fern was transferred to the U.S. Navy, and left Alaska for the Bremerton Navy Yard on 17 April 1917. There she was armed with a two 3-pounder guns. While she was assigned to the 13th Naval District, Fern remained in Ketchikan, her personnel were civilians, her work remained maintaining aids to navigation, and she was integrated with the Lighthouse Service for much of her activity.

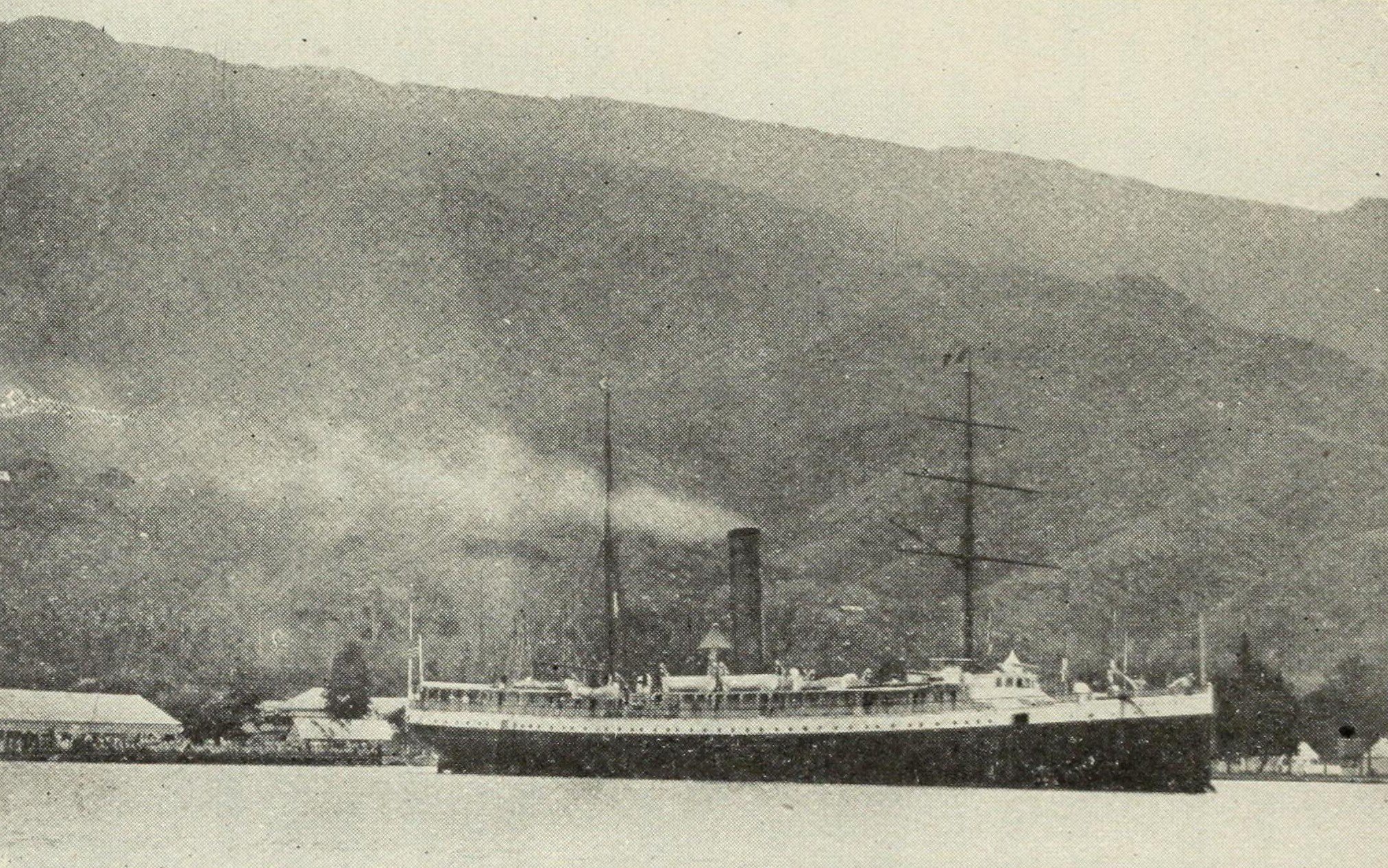
Alaska Steamship Company's Mariposa

As one of the only government vessels in Southeast Alaska waters, Fern was occasionally called upon to execute search and rescue missions. On 18 November 1917 the Alaska Steamship Company's Mariposa was underway in Sumner Strait when she hit a rock at Strait Island near Point Baker, Alaska. She had 269 passengers and almost $1 million in freight aboard when the accident occurred. The ship quickly settled to the bottom in shallow water. The day was calm, allowing all the passengers and 93 members of the crew to be safely evacuated to Wrangell. Fern carried all the passenger baggage to Wrangell.

While assigned to the Navy, Fern had her annual maintenance work done at the Bremerton Navy Yard. During her 1919 maintenance she had her first radio installed, and was issued the call sign NAFV.

After the war, on 1 July 1919, the components of the Lighthouse Service which had become part of the Navy, including Fern, were returned to the supervision of the Department of Commerce.

=== U.S. Lighthouse Service (1919–1934) ===
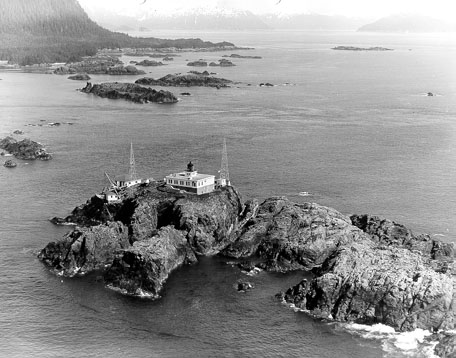
In 1925, Fern carried construction materials to build the Cape Spencer Light

Once again under Lighthouse Service orders, Fern continued to service her buoys and lighthouses. Her crew built a number of small lights and marks, and carried construction supplies to larger projects. In 1925 she brought construction materials to Cape Spencer to build the lighthouse there.

She also continued her search and rescue efforts. In December 1920 the Standard Oil tanker Atlas went aground in Wrangell Narrows with a cargo of gasoline and oil, and 20 crew aboard. Fern and USLHT Cedar were dispatched to assist. Much of her cargo spilled into the sea, but Atlas was towed back to Ketchikan by Cedar. The U.S. Forrest Service boat Ranger 4 was wrecked on Strait Island in August 1922, on the same reef where Mariposa sank in 1917. Fern was able to refloat her, but Ranger 4 was so damaged that she sank while under tow. The US Coast and Geodetic Survey steamer Explorer developed boiler trouble in Clarence Strait in October 1928, and Fern towed her to Ketchikan for repairs.

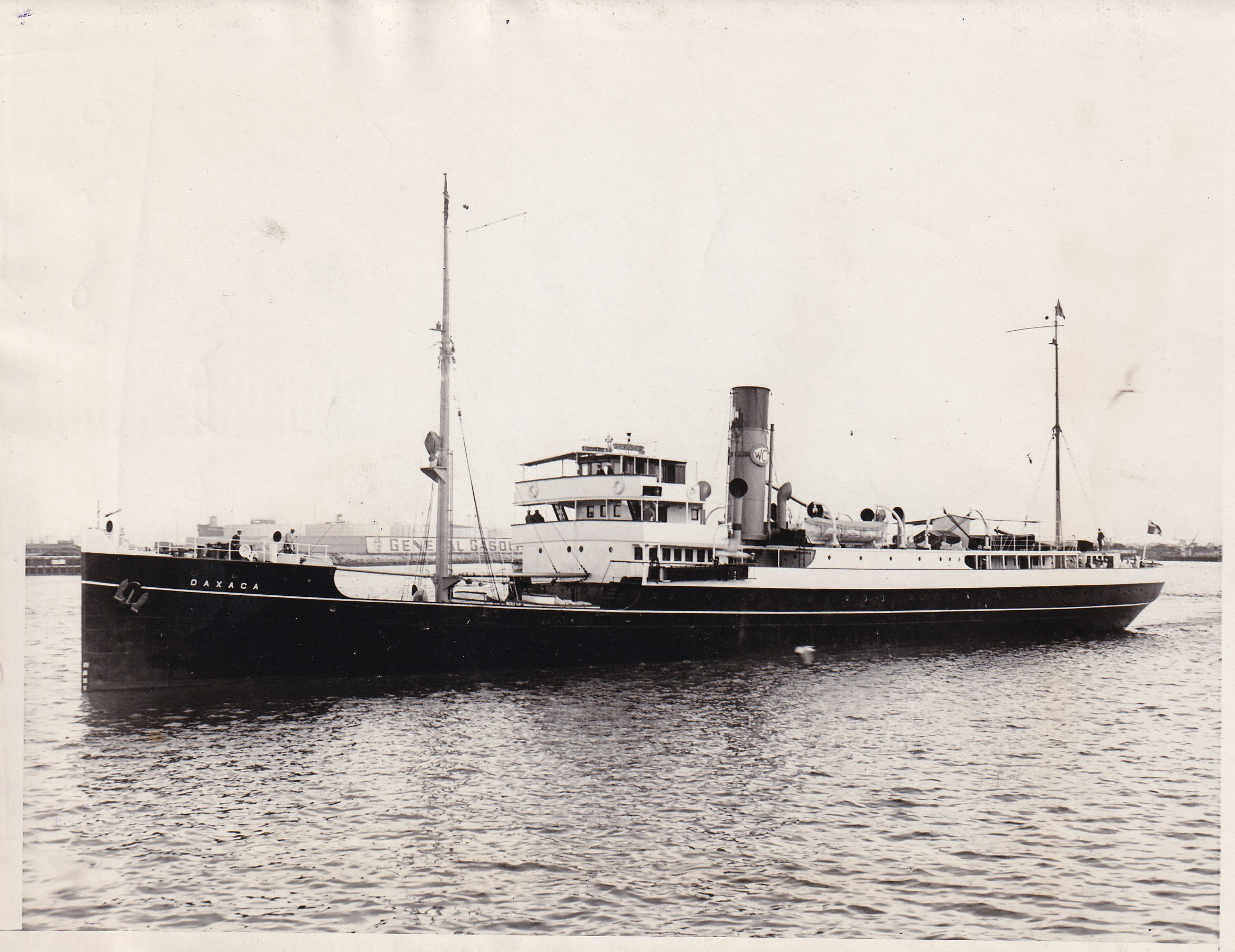
Fern rescued the passengers and crew of Oaxaca when she went aground in 1928

On 12 July 1928 the steam yacht Oaxaca went aground off Keene Island in Wrangell Narrows. This vessel was 255 feet (78 m) long. She was the personal yacht of G. Allan Hancock, one of the richest people in California. Fern was dispatched to the scene and transported Hancock, his 15 guests, 35 crew, and all their baggage safely to Petersburg.

In December 1922, Fern was disabled when she lost her rudder. USCGC Cedar towed her to Prince Rupert, British Columbia for dry-docking and the installation of a new rudder.

=== Obsolescence and sale ===
In June 1924, Commissioner of Lighthouses George R. Putnam sailed aboard Fern from Ketchikan to Juneau. His reaction to the ship is not recorded, but in his 1924 annual report, he suggested that Fern would have to be replaced in the next five years. In 1930, the Chambers of Commerce in Ketchikan and Seward lobbied Putnam and Congressman Albert Johnson to replace Fern with a larger, more capable vessel.

Fern was decommissioned and replaced in Ketchikan by the newly-built USLHT Hemlock in the summer of 1934. Fern sailed to the lighthouse depot in Seattle where she was offered for sale. The Lighthouse Service received eight bids for Fern on 3 September 1934, and V. S. Jenkins, a Seattle businessman, was the high bidder at $3,176. The ship was sold on 19 September 1934.

== Commercial operations (1934–1942?) ==
Jenkins sold Fern to Captain H. F. Haines, who sold her to Captain Peter Wold. Wold had her old steam engine and boiler removed and replaced them with a 300-horsepower Washington Iron Works Diesel engine in 1936. Seward, Alaska was her new home port.

Wold used her to carry freight, food, and mining supplies between Anchorage, Kodiak, Unalaska, Bristol Bay, and Good News Bay. Fern was not licensed by the Coast Guard to carry passengers but did so on several occasions. Captain Wold was fined $1,000 for carrying passengers in 1939.

On 13 June 1938 Wold was awarded a contract to carry the U.S. Mail from Seward to communities in Western Alaska, and Fern completed many of the deliveries. The subsidy for this service was about $50,000 per year. Fern went aground in False Pass on 23 December 1938 during one of her mail runs. She was loaded with holiday gifts and supplies for the Aleutians. She was refloated after more than a week on the beach without apparent damage, but late for Christmas. In June 1939 Fern was about 35 miles from Mount Veniaminof when the volcano erupted. Ash and sand landed on the ship's deck and visibility was reduced to about a mile. The mail contract ended in December 1940.

In 1941 Wold won a $40,000 government contract to transport construction material on Fern to Annette Island, likely for the U.S. Army Corps of Engineers which was building an airfield there. Wold sold the ship to the U.S. Army Corps of Engineers in late 1941 or early 1942.

== U.S. Army service (1942?–1947?) ==
Before and during World War II, the Seattle District of the Army Corps of Engineers was tasked with a number of construction projects in Alaska. As there were few sources of construction supplies in the territory, and shipping to Alaska was limited, the District began chartering and buying a heterogeneous collection of vessels which could move its supplies, equipment, and personnel from Seattle. Fern was one of these. After her purchase she was renamed S. D. Mason, classed as a freight-supply boat, and given the pennant number FS-551. Her namesake was Sampson Douglas Mason, who served as an engineer with the Seattle District of the Army Corps of Engineers for 27 years prior to his retirement in 1923.

The Seattle District's fleet, including S. D. Mason, was transferred from the Army Corps of Engineers to the Army Transport Service on 20 April 1943.

== Commercial operations (1947?–1981?) ==
By July 1947, S. D. Mason had been purchased by Harold A. Arensten, in partnership with Peter Wold, and Andrew Anderson. Arentsen owned the Big Port Walter Packing Company, a herring reduction plant at Big Port Walter on Baranof Island, Alaska. He changed her name back to Fern. Arensten was a business partner with Peter Wold in ownership of Fern in the 1930's. It is possible that Arensten's familiarity with the ship as Fern suggested changing her name back. Her Federal documentation listed her as a freighter, so it is likely that he used her to supply the plant. Arensten owned her at least through 1956, when he left the herring business at Big Port Walter.

Fern was converted into a fishing vessel and fished for halibut in Alaska until 1964 when a Russian trawler swept away her gear. At this point she was equipped for crabbing. Her history through this period is largely undocumented but for one incident. On 13 September 1964 Fern collided with the fishing vessel Locks near Unalaska. Locks sank. Through a series of owners, she retained the name Fern until at least 1979. In 1981 her Federal documentation lists her as Northern I. Her ultimate fate is unknown.
