= Samuel Shepherd =

British barrister, judge and politician

The Right Honourable Sir Samuel Shepherd KS FRSE

Solicitor General for England and Wales
- In office December 1813 – 1817

Attorney General for England and Wales
- In office 1817 – June 1819

Lord Chief Baron of the Scottish Court of Exchequer
- In office June 1819 – February 1830

Personal details
- Born: 6 April 1760
- Died: 3 November 1840 (aged 80)
- Children: Henry John Shepherd
- Education: Merchant Taylors' School
- Profession: Barrister, judge, politician

Sir Samuel Shepherd KS PC FRSE (6 April 1760 – 3 November 1840) was a British barrister, judge and politician who served as Attorney General and Lord Chief Baron of the Scottish Court of Exchequer.

== Early life and career ==
Shepherd was born on 6 April 1760 to Henry Shepherd, a London jeweller. From 1773 to 1774 he was educated at Merchant Taylors' School and then at a different school in Chiswick, entering the Inner Temple in July 1776. After a pupillage under Charles Runnington he was called to the Bar on 23 November 1781. He soon joined the home circuit, a place where, along with the Court of Common Pleas, he had great success. From 1790 onwards he gradually became deaf, rejecting the honour of being made a King's Counsel in 1793 but accepting a promotion to Serjeant-at-Law in 1796, becoming a King's Serjeant the next year and, after the death of Serjeant Cockell, King's Ancient Serjeant. In 1812 he became Solicitor-General of the Duchy of Cornwall.

He came to fame in 1810 in his defence of Francis Burdett in his dispute with the House of Commons.

== Political and judicial work ==
In December 1813, Shepherd was made Solicitor General for England and Wales, and returned to Parliament for Dorchester on 11 April 1814. He received a knighthood from the Prince Regent on 11 May 1814, and became Attorney General for England in 1817. Shepherd was an excellent and popular lawyer, who would have become far more successful if it was not for his deafness; he refused the offices of both Lord Chief Justice of the Court of King's Bench and Chief Justice of the Common Pleas, partly due to his deafness and partly because he refused to hold a judicial office that involved the trial of prisoners. In London his address was 38 Bloomsbury Square.

In June 1819 he accepted the position of Lord Chief Baron of the Scottish Court of Exchequer, becoming a member of the Privy Council on 23 July, and as Lord Chief Baron advised Scottish judges on the application of English treason law to the participants of the Radical War. He moved to Edinburgh living at Newington House.

In 1820 he was elected a Fellow of the Royal Society of Edinburgh. His proposers were Sir William Adam of Blair Adam, Henry Mackenzie and Thomas Charles Hope. He served as the sciety's vice president from 1823 to 1830.

In February 1830 Shepherd was forced to retire due to ill health. He became totally blind in 1837. He died in a cottage at Streatley, Berkshire on 3 November 1840.

Newington House stood on what is now Blacket Avenue and was demolished in 1966.

== Family ==
On 1 January 1783, Shepherd married Miss Elizabeth White (d. 1833), daughter of John White of Hicks Hall in St Sepulchre in outer London, sister of John White the Attorney General of Canada. Their son, Henry John Shepherd KC (d. 1866), was a legal author.

Parliament of the United Kingdom
Preceded by Robert Williams; William à Court	Member of Parliament for Dorchester; 1814–1819; With: Robert Williams	Succeeded by Robert Williams; Charles Warren
Legal offices
Preceded by Joseph Jekyll	Solicitor-General of the Duchy of Cornwall; 1812–1813	Succeeded by William Draper Best
Preceded by Sir Robert Dallas	Solicitor General; 1813–1817	Succeeded by Sir Robert Gifford
Preceded by Sir William Garrow	Attorney General; 1817–1819	Succeeded by Sir Robert Gifford
