= Ferne Carter Pierce =

American farmer and politician (1920–1978)

Ferne Carter Pierce (September 10, 1920 – December 31, 1978), later Vincent, was an American farmer and politician who served as a Democratic member of the Illinois House of Representatives from 1957 to 1963.

== Biography ==
Born September 10, 1920 in Selma, California, daughter of cattleman and rancher. She was educated in Selma public schools at and Mills College for Women, in Oakland, California. She married Tim J. Pierce on December 29, 1944, with whom she had three children. She and her husband farmed cattle on a 1,000 acre farm near Malta, Illinois. In 1955–56, she was secretary-treasurer of the Women's Auxiliary of the American Angus Association. She was also involved as a precinct committeeman and secretary of the DeKalb County Democratic Central Committee.

In 1956, she was elected to the Illinois House of Representatives as one of three representatives from the 32nd district. The 32nd district included all or parts of Boone, DeKalb, McHenry, and Ogle counties in northern Illinois. She served as Vice Chair of the Roads and Bridges Committee from 1961–1962. While a member of the Illinois House, she was a member of the National Order of Women Legislators. Pierce was defeated for renomination in the 1962 Democratic primary. She died in 1978.
