= Hortense Ferne =

American artist

Hortense T. Ferne
- Born: 1885; New York City
- Died: 1976 (aged 89–90); New York City

Hortense T. Ferne (1885–1976) was an American artist. Her work is included in the collections of the Smithsonian American Art Museum, the Nelson-Atkins Museum of Art, the Philadelphia Museum of Art, the Chrysler Museum of Art, the Mattatuck Museum and the Metropolitan Museum of Art, New York.
