= John Fearn (sailor) =

English explorer (born c. 1768)

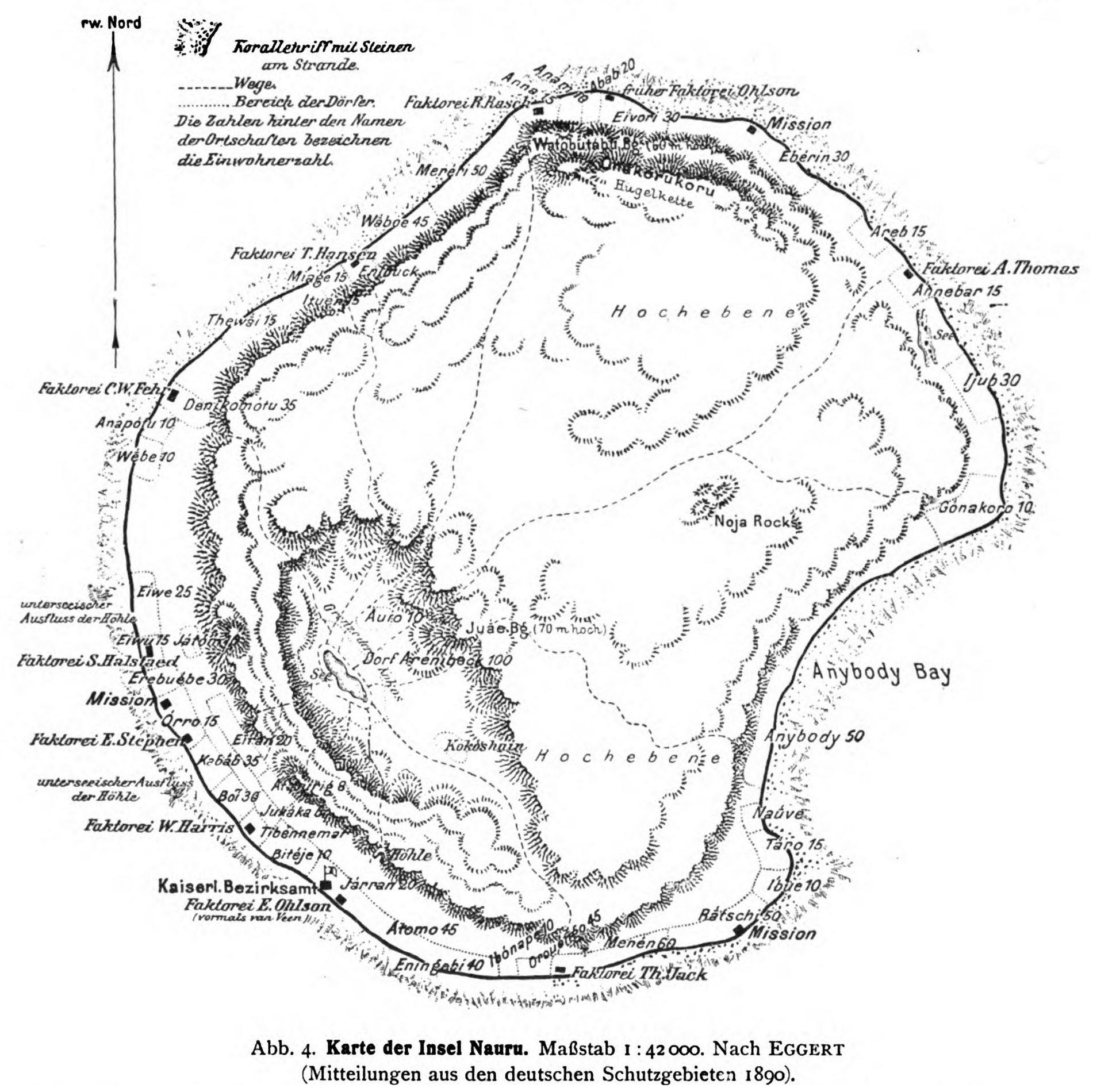
Map of Nauru, 1914

John Fearn (born c. 1768, fl. 1798) was an English ship captain, notable as the first European to report sighting the Pacific island of Nauru. He was probably born on 24 August 1768 in Kingston upon Hull.

== Voyage of discovery ==
Captain Fearn departed Calcutta in the first half of 1798 in command of the snow Hunter (300 tons), owned by Campbell, Clarke & Co of Calcutta. Among those on board was supercargo and partner in the firm that owned the vessel, Robert Campbell. The newly built vessel was named after the then governor of New South Wales, John Hunter, and carried a speculative cargo of mixed goods. It arrived at Sydney on 17 June 1798 where it, "came to a very advantageous market, the Colony being at the time of her arrival, in great want of stores and provisions".

Hunter departed Sydney 20 August 1798 bound for New Zealand. On arrival six weeks was spent at the Thames River, in the North Island, taking spars. She sailed from New Zealand in October and went on to discover Hunter Island (sometimes called Fearn Island) and then Nauru, which was sighted on 8 November 1798. Captain Fearn named it Pleasant Island due to its attractive appearance.

Fearn was commemorated on the obverse of a $10 Nauruan coin and on a Nauruan postage stamp issued in 1974.

Fearn has frequently been confused with his contemporary namesake, a British philosopher who spent some years as an officer in the Royal Navy.
