= Naomi Fearn =

German–American comic artist

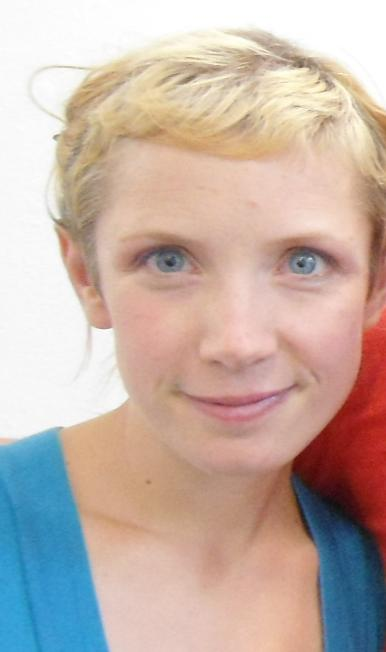
The German comic artist Naomi Fearn

Naomi Fearn (born 8 June 1976 in Stuttgart) is a German–American comic artist. Her autobiographical Comicstrip Zuckerfisch appeared in the Stuttgarter Zeitung from 2000 to 2014.

== Life ==
From 1986 she attended the Karls-Gymnasium in Stuttgart, in between she was in the US from June to December 1990, where she attended the San Francisco High School of Arts. She graduated from high school in 1996. From 1998 to 2003, she studied free graphic design at the Staatliche Akademie der Bildenden Künste Stuttgart.

As early as 1991, she contributed the illustrations for the children's book "Der kleine gelbe Bagger"; her first comics were later published in the magazine Moga Mobo. The comics created during this time as term paper work were accepted by Ehapa Verlag and published as part of the promotion of young talent. From December 2000, the adventures of the title heroine Nomi, her flatmates and the gay white rabbit appeared every Thursday in the Stuttgarter Zeitung. In 2003, Fearn moved to Berlin. Her last comic with a completed story is Dirt Girl. Collected Zuckerfisch strips from the Stuttgarter Zeitung were published in six volumes by Zwerchfell Verlag from 2002 to 2012. In July 2014, the Stuttgarter Zeitung ended Zuckerfisch.

Since 2017, Fearn has been drawing comic strips for the Berlin Tagesspiegel, initially weekly and since 2018 from Monday to Friday. The series is called "R2G-WG" and caricatures the three Berlin state politicians Michael Müller ("Michi"), Klaus Lederer ("Klausi") and Ramona Pop ("Poppi") of the red-red-green Senate Müller.

In addition to her comics, Fearn also illustrates books in the Tiger Team series by Thomas Brezina.

== Works ==
- Der kleine gelbe Bagger (Illustrations)
- Zuckerfisch. (2000) Ehapa Verlag, ISBN 3-7704-0501-3
- Zuckerfisch - mit Sahnemeerrettich. (2002) Zwerchfell Verlag, ISBN 3-928387-54-5
- Comictanke. Zwerchfell Verlag
- Dirt Girl. (2004) Zwerchfell Verlag, ISBN 3-928387-67-7
- Zuckerfisch - in Marinade. (2005) Zwerchfell Verlag, ISBN 3-928387-74-X
- Zuckerfisch - im eigenen Saft. (2006) Zwerchfell Verlag, ISBN 3-928387-76-6
- Katie Cat. (2008) Ehapa Comic Collection, ISBN 978-3-7704-3170-0. As illustrator, together with Stefan Dinter, a comic adaptation of the book of the same name by Thomas Brezina.
- Zuckerfisch - auf die Hand. (2009) Zwerchfell Verlag, ISBN 3-928387-88-X
- Zuckerfisch - mit Liebe gemacht. (2010) Zwerchfell Verlag, ISBN 978-3-928387-89-7
- Zuckerfisch - On The Rocks. (2012) Zwerchfell Verlag, ISBN 978-3-943547-03-0
