= USS Fern (1862) =

Tugboat of the United States Navy

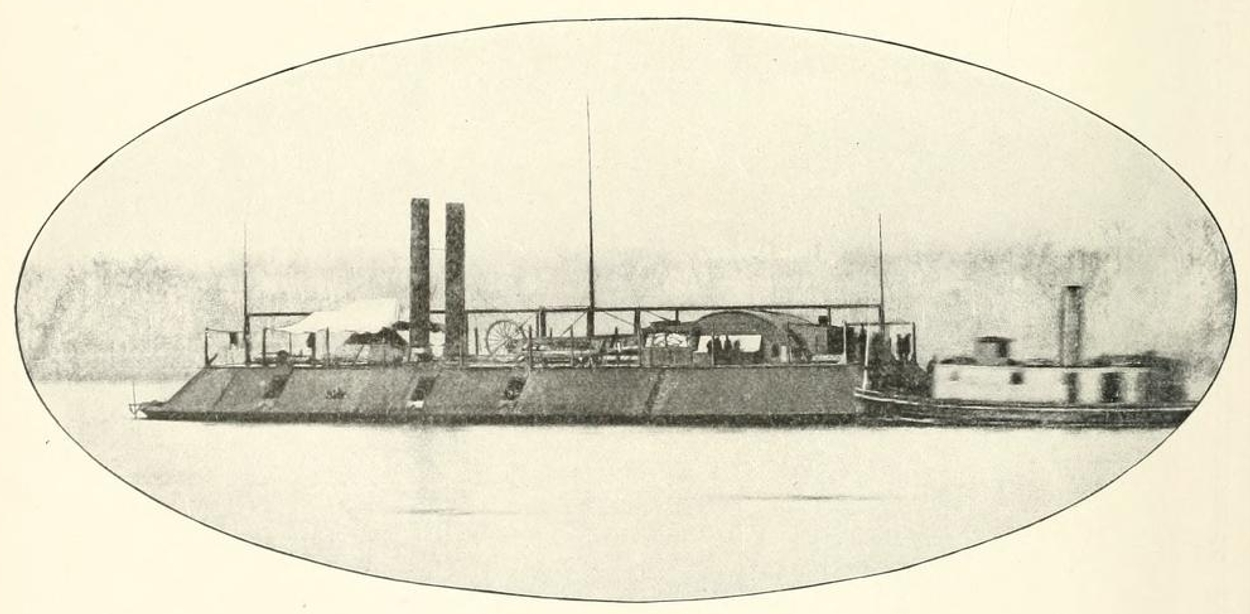
- USS Fern with a City-class ironclad in a left.

History

United States
- Commissioned: 19 October 1862
- Decommissioned: 12 August 1865
- Fate: Sold

General characteristics
- Displacement: 50 tons
- Draft: 6 ft (1.8 m)
- Propulsion: steam engine
- Speed: 10 knots (19 km/h; 12 mph)
- Armament: one 12-pounder gun

USS Fern was a tugboat acquired by the Union Navy during the American Civil War. Her task was to tow other ships and barges, and to provide other duties that a tug could easily do, such as dispatch running.

== Service history ==
The first ship to be named Fern by the Union Navy was a tug, formerly Intrepid, which operated under Master Alpheus Amiss with the War Department's Western Flotilla until 1 October 1862 when all these vessels were transferred to the Union Navy. Placed in the command of Amiss who was made Acting Ensign, she was renamed Fern about 19 October. By that time, the Western Flotilla was renamed the Mississippi River Squadron, which operated on western waters between Cairo, Illinois, and the mouth of the Red River. She towed barges loaded with troops, delivered dispatches, transported officers, and tended coal barges.

On 19 March 1863 during a joint expedition to penetrate the Yazoo River, she carried Major-General William T. Sherman up Steele's Bayou. From August 1863 to May 1865 she was stationed off Natchez, Mississippi, to tend and pump coal barges, and in early June 1865 participated in an expedition up the Red River to receive the surrender of Confederate Navy men and material. Fern was ordered to Mound City, Illinois, where on 12 August 1865 she was decommissioned and later sold.
