= Walker Fearn =

American diplomat

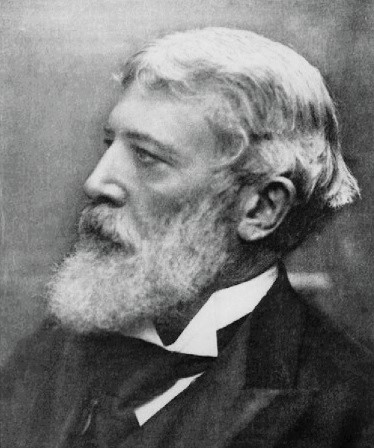
- Born: January 13, 1831; Huntsville, Alabama, US
- Died: April 7, 1899 (aged 68); Hot Springs, Virginia
- Occupation: Diplomat
- Relatives: LeRoy Pope Walker (uncle)

John Williams Walker Fearn (January 13, 1832 – April 7, 1899) was an American diplomat.

== Early life ==
Fearn, born in Huntsville, Alabama, was an 1851 graduate of Yale University. He was the nephew of LeRoy Pope Walker, the first Secretary of War of the Confederacy.

Following Yale University, Fearn continued to study law and was admitted to the Mobile bar in 1853.

== Career ==
He spent most of the 1850s on the staffs of the American embassies in Belgium and Mexico, then joined the Confederate diplomatic corps when the Civil War broke out in 1861. While in Europe, he attended the lectures of the College de France in Paris. After serving on unsuccessful missions to Spain, France, Russia, and Mexico, Fearn moved to New Orleans when the war was over to practice law.

From 1885 to 1889, Fearn served as the American minister to Serbia, Romania, and Greece. He later served as chief of the Department of Foreign Affairs for the World's Columbian Exposition in Chicago in 1893.

== Personal life ==
Fearn married Frances Hewitt of Louisville in 1865. They had four children including Mary Walker, Percy Le Roy, James Hewitt and Clarice Hewitt.

Their daughter Mary Walker married Prince Serge Wolkonsky.

John Walker Fearn died on April 7, 1899.
