= John Fearn (philosopher) =

British philosopher

John Fearn (1768 – 3 December 1837) was a British philosopher. Note: He has frequently been confused with John Fearn, the English whaling captain who was the first European to discover Nauru in 1798.

Little is known about Fearn's early life. He was probably born in May 1768 (baptised 11 May) in Chatham, Kent He spent some years as an officer in the Royal Navy, and after retirement devoted himself to philosophical writings.

He was particularly interested in ocular phenomena and visual perception. He was a friend of Samuel Parr and Basil Montagu.

Fearn died in Sloane St, Chelsea, on 3 December 1837.

== Works ==
- An Essay on Consciousness, or a Series of Evidences of a Distinct Mind, London, 1810, 2nd edit. 1812, 4to
- A Review of First Principles of Bishop Berkeley, Dr. Reid, and Professor Stewart, with an indication of other principles, London, 1813, 4to (also printed in the ‘Pamphleteer,’ No. vi.)
- An Essay on Immortality, London, 1814, 8vo.
- A Demonstration of the Principles of Primary Vision, with the consequent state of Philo- sophy in Great Britain, London, 1815, 4to
- A Demonstration of Necessary Connection, London, 1815, 4to
- A Letter to Professor Stewart on the Objects of General Terms, and on the Axiomatical Laws of Vision, London, 1817, 4to
- First Lines of the Human Mind, London, 1820, 8vo
- Anti-Tooke; or an Analysis of the Principles and Structure of Language exemplified in the English Tongue, London, 1824, 8vo
- A Manual of the Physiology of Mind, comprehending the First Principles of Physical Theology, with which are laid out the crucial objections to the Reideian Theory. To which is suffixed a paper on the Logic of Relation considered as a machine for Ratiocinative Science, London, 1829, 8vo
- A Rationale of the Laws of Cerebral Vision, comprising the Laws of Single and of Erect Vision, deduced upon the Principles of Dioptrics, London, 1830, 8vo
- The Human Sensorium investigated as to figure, London, 1832, 8vo
- An Appeal to Philosophers by name on the Demonstration of Vision on the Brain, and against the attack of Sir David Brewster on the Rationale of Cerebral Vision, London, 1837, 8vo.

== Sources ==
- James McMullen Rigg, Dictionary of National Biography, 1885–1900, Volume 18: Fearn, John, in Wikiquote
- Post-Reformation Digital Library: John Fearn
