= Primrose (surname) =

Primrose is a surname, and may refer to:

- Angus Primrose (missing at sea, 1980), British designer and naval architect
- Archibald Primrose, 1st Earl of Rosebery (1661–1723), Scottish politician
- Archibald Primrose, 4th Earl of Rosebery (1783–1868), British politician
- Archibald Primrose, 5th Earl of Rosebery (1847–1929), Prime Minister of the United Kingdom
- Archibald Primrose, Lord Carrington (1616–1679), Scottish Royalist lawyer and judge
- Archibald Primrose, Lord Dalmeny (1809–1851), Scottish politician
- Bouverie Francis Primrose (1813–1898), British landowner and administrator
- Christine Primrose (born 1950), Scottish Gaelic singer and music teacher
- Clarence Primrose (1830–1902), Canadian politician
- Diana Primrose (fl. c.1630), English author of a eulogy for Queen Elizabeth I
- Edward Primrose (born 1950), Australian composer and writer
- Eva Primrose, Countess of Rosebery (1892–1987), wife in her second marriage of Harry Primrose, 6th Earl of Rosebery
- Francis Ward Primrose (1785–1860), Scottish barrister and politician, son of Neil Primrose, 3rd Earl of Rosebery
- George H. Primrose (1852–1919), Canadian and American minstrel performer in the duo Primrose and West
- George Anson Primrose (1849–1930), British naval officer
- Gilbert Primrose (minister) (1566/7–1642), Scottish Calvinist minister
- Gilbert Primrose (surgeon) (c.1535–1616), Scottish surgeon
- Gilbert E. Primrose (1848–1935), Scottish footballer
- Graham Primrose (born 1939), Australian tennis player
- Hannah Primrose, Countess of Rosebery (1851–1890), Rothschild heiress and wife of Archibald Primrose, 5th Earl of Rosebery
- Harold Primrose (1910–1960), Australian rugby union footballer
- Harriet Primrose, Countess of Rosebery, British art consultant
- Harry Primrose, 6th Earl of Rosebery (1882–1974), British Liberal politician and peer
- Harry Primrose, 8th Earl of Rosebery (born 1967), British peer and Chairman of Sotheby's UK
- Henry Primrose (1846–1923), Scottish civil servant
- Hubert Primrose (1882–1942), Australian politician
- James Primrose (Clerk of the Privy Council of Scotland) (died 1641)
- James Primrose (physician) (died 1659), English physician, son of minister Gilbert Primrose
- James Primrose, 10th Laird of Burnbrae (1746–1827), last Laird of Burnbrae
- John Primrose (brewer) (c.1803–1876), Scottish distiller and brewer in South Australia
- John Primrose (sport shooter), Canadian sport trap shooter
- John Ure Primrose (1847–1924), Scottish merchant, Lord Provost of Glasgow and baronet
- Les Primrose (1890–1918), Australian rules footballer
- Neil Primrose (musician), Scottish drummer with the rock band Travis
- Neil Primrose (politician) (1882–1917), British politician and soldier
- Neil Primrose, 3rd Earl of Rosebery (1728–1814), Scottish peer and politician
- Neil Primrose, 7th Earl of Rosebery (1929–2024), Scottish peer
- Patrick Primrose (c.1605–1671), Scottish Dominican Catholic priest
- Peter Primrose (born 1955), Australian politician
- Philip Primrose (1864–1937), Canadian police officer
- Ronald Primrose, Lord Dalmeny (1910–1931), Scottish cricketer
- William Primrose (1904–1982), Scottish violist

== See also ==
- Clan Primrose
- Laird of Burnbrae
