= Primrose =

Primrose may refer to:

== Botany ==
- Primula vulgaris, commonly known as the primrose (also called the common primrose or English primrose)
- many other species of the genus Primula
- Primulaceae, family of flowering plants, commonly known as the primrose family
- Oenothera, commonly known as evening primrose, a plant genus
- Onagraceae, commonly known as the willowherb family or evening primrose family

== Places ==
=== Britain ===
- Primrose Hill in London

=== Canada ===
- Primrose Lake on the Alberta/Saskatchewan border

=== South Africa ===
- Primrose, Gauteng
  - Primrose (House of Assembly of South Africa constituency)

=== United States ===
- Primrose, Alaska
- Primrose, Georgia
- Primrose, Iowa
- Primrose, Kentucky
- Primrose, Nebraska
- Primrose, Ohio
- Primrose, Rhode Island
- Primrose, Tarrant County, Texas
- Primrose, Van Zandt County, Texas
- Primrose, Wisconsin
  - Primrose (community), Wisconsin

== People ==
=== Families ===
- Clan Primrose, Scottish clan headed by the Earl of Rosebery
  - Earl of Rosebery, title linked with the Clan Primrose
  - Laird of Burnbrae, title linked with the Clan Primrose

=== Surname ===
- Primrose (surname)

=== Given name ===
- Primrose (given name)

== Military warships and civilian freighters ==
- HMS Primrose, several Royal Navy ships
- MV Primrose, freight and passenger ferry
- MV Primrose, Hong Kong freighter grounded on North Sentinel Island.

== Other ==
- Primrose (musical), a musical comedy
- Primrose (group), South Korean pop group
- Primrose Brook, tributary of the Passaic River
- Primrose Day, anniversary of the death of British prime minister Benjamin Disraeli
- Primrose League, organisation founded in 1883 to promote Toryism
- Primrose High School, 11-19 comprehensive school in Leeds, UK
- Operation Primrose, the code name later given to the capture of German submarine U-110
- Primrose, video game for the Nintendo DSi
- Primrose ("Prim") Everdeen, fictional character in The Hunger Games trilogy
- Primrose, No. 27 of the SECR P Class

== See also ==
- Primrose Path (disambiguation)
