= Harry Primrose =

Harry Primrose may refer to:

- Harry Primrose, 6th Earl of Rosebery, British politician
- Harry Primrose, 8th Earl of Rosebery, British aristocrat and chairman of Sotheby's
