= James Primrose =

James Primrose may refer to:

- James Primrose (Clerk of the Privy Council of Scotland) (died 1641)
- James Primrose (physician) (died 1659), English physician, son of minister Gilbert Primrose
- James Primrose, 10th Laird of Burnbrae (1746–1827), last Laird of Burnbrae
