= British-American Project =

Organization

The British-American Project (BAP) is an organisation intended to strengthen links between the United Kingdom and the United States. BAP operates on a not-for-profit basis, funded through its membership and support from corporate partners. It was originally named the British-American Project for the Successor Generation.

== Goals ==
Established in 1985, BAP was created to help maintain and enrich the Special Relationship between the United Kingdom and the United States. The Project was the brainchild of Nick Butler, an economist at BP, who at that time was also a prospective Labour Party parliamentary candidate. Along with others in both countries who viewed the Special Relationship favorably, he had become concerned about a growing tide of anti-American sentiment among his generation in the UK. Butler's response was to propose a series of conferences, developing relationships between the participants and broadening understanding.

A US BAP organiser describes the BAP network as committed to "grooming leaders" while promoting "the leading global role that [the US and Britain] continue to play".

== Organisation ==
The British-American Project is affiliated with the Johns Hopkins University's Paul H. Nitze School of Advanced International Studies (SAIS). BAP is a non-profit, funded by its members and donations from corporate partners.

Nick Cohen, writing in The Observer in 1999, criticised the scheme on the grounds that it encouraged the adoption in Europe of policy from the United States.

Andy Beckett, writing in The Guardian in 2004, said of the organisation "You won't have heard of the British-American Project, but its members include some of the most powerful men and women in the UK". He writes that in the work of the organisation "a process of political education can be discerned of which J Howard Pew would have approved", and that "American notions such as less regulated capitalism, a smaller 'enabling state' and a world kept safe by the Pentagon came to be regarded as sensible, inevitable". He notes that people with military experience are important in BAP.

== Notable current and former members ==
=== Fellows ===
==== Politicians ====
- (United Kingdom) Douglas Alexander, Labour MP
- (United Kingdom) Rushanara Ali, Labour MP
- (United Kingdom) Stephen Dorrell, former Conservative MP and Liberal Democrat
- (United Kingdom) Steve Hilton, political commentator and former political adviser
- (United Kingdom) David Miliband, former Labour MP
- (United Kingdom) Peter Mandelson, Baron Mandelson, former Labour MP and former British ambassador to the United States, life peer
- (United Kingdom) Mo Mowlam, former Labour MP
- (United Kingdom) Geoff Mulgan, academic and former Director of the Prime Minister's Strategy Unit
- (United Kingdom) Jonathan Powell (Tony Blair's chief of staff)
- (United Kingdom) George Robertson, Baron Robertson of Port Ellen, former Labour MP
- (United Kingdom) Patricia Scotland, diplomat, barrister and Labour life peer
- Alan Sked, founder of the United Kingdom Independence Party (UKIP)
- (United Kingdom) Elizabeth Symons, Baroness Symons of Vernham Dean, trade unionist and Labour life peer
- (United Kingdom) Matthew Taylor (political strategist), former head of the Number 10 Policy Unit, Chief Executive of the NHS Confederation
- (United Kingdom) David Willetts, former Conservative MP, life peer
- (United Kingdom) Kate Forbes, Deputy First Minister of Scotland and Scottish National Party MSP
- (United Kingdom) Anas Sarwar, Scottish Labour Party Leader
- (United States) Diana Villiers Negroponte, trade lawyer and academic

==== Journalists ====
- (United Kingdom) Yasmin Alibhai-Brown, The Independent, The London Evening Standard
- (United Kingdom) George Brock, The Times
- (United Kingdom) Diane Coyle, The Independent
- (United Kingdom) Evan Davis, BBC
- (United States) Daniel Drezner, The Wall Street Journal, The New Republic, Foreign Affairs, Foreign Policy, The New York Times, Slate, Tech Central Station, among others
- (United Kingdom) Daniel Franklin, The Economist
- (United Kingdom) Jane Hill, BBC
- (United Kingdom) Isabel Hilton, The Independent, The Guardian, BBC
- (United States) Frederick Kempe, The Wall Street Journal
- (United Kingdom) Charles Moore, The Daily Telegraph, The Sunday Telegraph, The Spectator
- (United Kingdom) James Naughtie, BBC
- (United Kingdom) Jeremy Paxman, BBC
- (United Kingdom) Rowan Pelling, The Daily Telegraph
- (United Kingdom) Trevor Phillips, BBC
- (United Kingdom) Caroline St John-Brooks, The Times Educational Supplement, The Sunday Times
- (United States) Joel Stein, LA Times

==== Arts and media ====
- (United Kingdom) Margaret Hill, BBC current affairs producer
- (United Kingdom) Benjamin Zephaniah, poet

==== Other ====
- (United Kingdom) Janet Bloomfield, peace and disarmament campaigner
- (United Kingdom) Shami Chakrabarti, Former director, Liberty
- (United Kingdom) Caroline, Lady Dalmeny, former defence policy analyst
- (United Kingdom) Julia Hobsbawm, writer and public speaker
- (United Kingdom) Hardeep Singh Kohli British presenter and comedian
