= Hound Point =

Hound Point Terminal
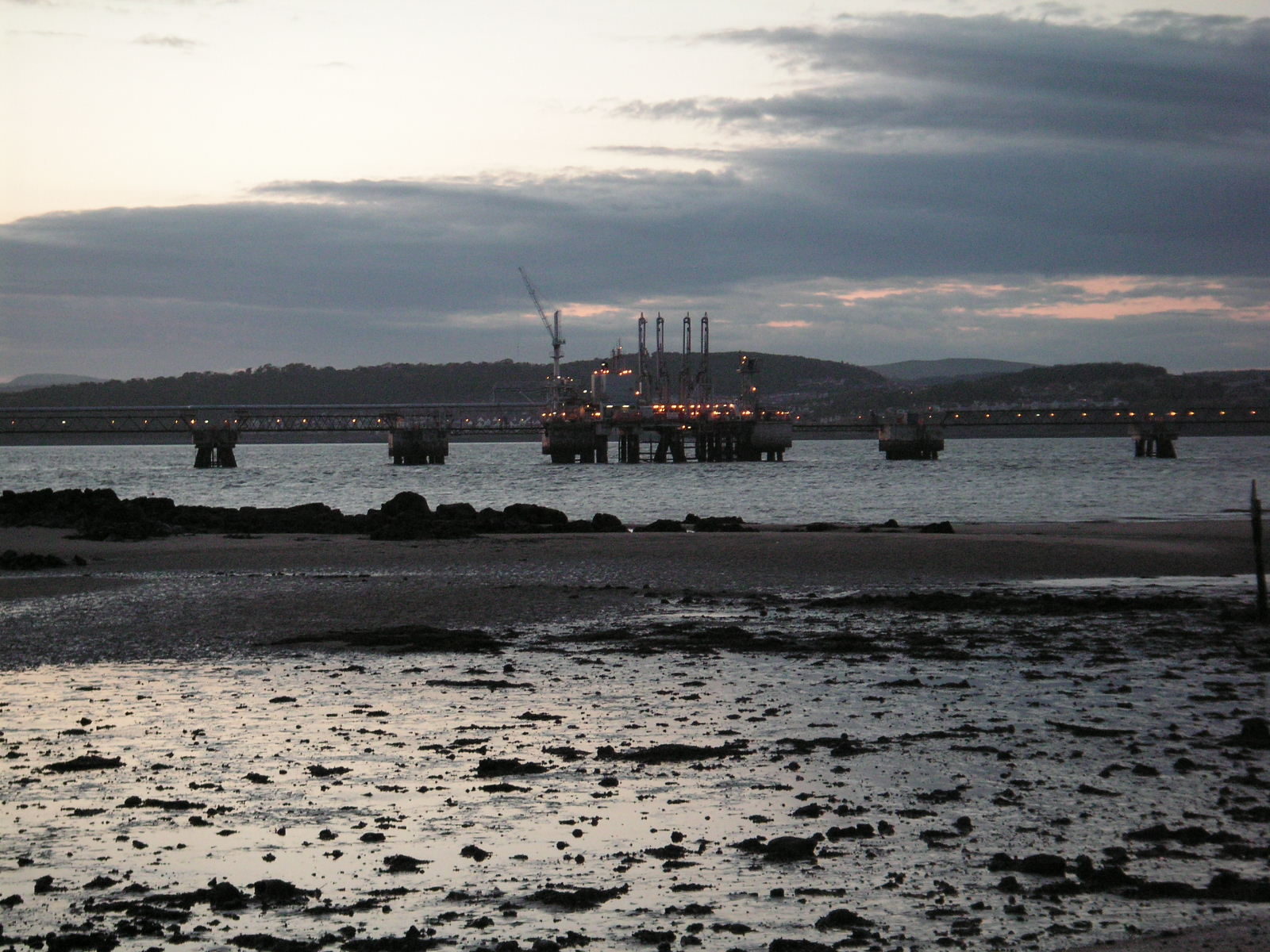
- Hound Point terminal at dusk
- Click on the map for a fullscreen view

Location
- Country: United Kingdom
- Location: South Queensferry, City of Edinburgh, Scotland
- Coordinates: 56.0059°N 3.3591°W

Details
- Opened: 1975
- Operated by: Ineos
- Owned by: Ineos
- Type of harbour: oil terminal, Panamax

Hound Point is a marine terminal off a rocky headland of that name on the southern shore of the Firth of Forth, Scotland, just east of the Forth Bridge at South Queensferry. Opened in 1975, it is owned and operated by Ineos as an oil-export terminal for North Sea oil and is the largest such facility in Scotland.

The terminal is made up of two sea-island berths that can load vessels of up to 350,000 DWT and a vapour recovery platform. Crude oil from the Forties pipeline undergoes stabilisation and gas processing and treatment at the Kinneil Terminal at Grangemouth before being pumped to a tank farm at Dalmeny on the southern shore of the Firth. The oil is then pumped to the Hound Point terminal where it is loaded onto tankers.

The name 'Hound Point' derives from a local legend concerning the lord of nearby Barnbougle Castle, currently Lord Rosebery. The legend states that one of the first lords set off to fight in the Crusades, leaving his beloved hunting-hound behind. At the moment the man was killed, the hound began howling uncontrollably, eventually dying of its grief. Ever since, the howling ghost of the hound is said to appear on the Point whenever the present lord is about to die.

== See also ==
- List of ports and harbours in Scotland
- List of Panamax ports#Great Britain
