= Neil Primrose =

Neil Primrose may refer to:

- Neil Primrose (politician) (1882–1917), British Liberal politician and soldier
- Neil Primrose, 3rd Earl of Rosebery (1728–1814), Scottish peer and politician
- Neil Primrose, 7th Earl of Rosebery (1929–2024), Scottish nobleman
- Neil Primrose (musician) (born 1972), drummer of the Scottish band Travis
