= John Primrose =

John Primrose may refer to:

- John Primrose, 4th Laird of Burnbrae (1590–1669)
- John Primrose, 5th Laird of Burnbrae (c.1617-?)
- John Primrose, 8th Laird of Burnbrae (c.1719-?)
- John Primrose (brewer) (c. 1803–1876) founder of South Australia's first successful brewery
- John Primrose (sport shooter), Canadian Olympic sport shooter
