= Thomas Robertson =

Thomas, Tom or Tommy Robertson may refer to:

- Thomas Robertson (priest) (fl. 1532–1559), Anglican archdeacon of Leicester and dean of Durham
- Thomas Alexander Robertson (1909–1973), better known by his pen name of "Vagaland", Shetland poet
- Thomas Bolling Robertson (born 1950), American diplomat, ambassador to Slovenia 2004–2008
- Thomas Campbell Robertson (1789–1863), British civil servant in India
- Thomas Chalmers Robertson (1907–1989), author, ecologist and conservationist from South Africa
- T. W. Robertson (Thomas William Robertson, 1829–1871), English dramatist and stage director
- Hamza Robertson (Tom Robertson, born 1982), English singer
- T. A. Robertson (Thomas Argyll Robertson, 1909–1994), Scottish MI5 intelligence officer
- Thomas Dolby (Thomas Morgan Robertson, born 1958), musician
- Thomas Robertson (minister) (died 1799), co-founder of the Royal Society of Edinburgh
- Thomas S. Robertson (fl. 1960s–2010s), Scottish-born American professor of marketing
- Thomas Graham Robertson, Lord Robertson (1881–1944), Scottish advocate
- Thomas Shaftoe Robertson (1765–1831), British actor and theatre manager

== Politicians ==
- Thomas A. Robertson (1848–1892), U.S. representative from Kentucky
- Thomas B. Robertson (1779–1828), U.S. representative, governor and federal judge from Louisiana
- Thomas Herbert Robertson (1849–1916), British politician, Conservative MP for Hackney South
- Thomas J. Robertson (1823–1897), U.S. senator from South Carolina
- Thomas Robertson (Australian politician) (1830–1891), New South Wales politician
- Thomas Robertson (Nova Scotia politician) (1852–1902), Canadian politician, member of parliament from Nova Scotia
- Thomas Robertson (Ontario politician) (1827–1905), Canadian politician, member of parliament from Ontario
- T. Atholl Robertson (1874–1955), Scottish politician, Liberal MP for Finchley 1923–24

== Sportspeople ==
- Thomas Robertson (footballer, born 1864) (1864–1924), Scottish footballer (Queen's Park FC and Scotland) and referee
- Thomas Robertson (footballer, born 1875) (1875–1923), Scottish footballer who played for Stoke, Liverpool and Southampton
- Tommy Robertson (1876–1941), Scottish international footballer
- Tom Robertson (Australian footballer) (1876–1942), Australian rules footballer
- Thomas Robertson (baseball) (1887–1947), American merchant and baseball player and coach
- Thomas Robertson (footballer, born 1905) (1905-1985), English footballer for Bury and Hartlepools United, see List of Bury F.C. players (1–24 appearances)
- Tom Robertson (Scottish footballer) (1908–1962), Scottish footballer (Ayr United, Dundee, Clyde)
- Tom Robertson (American football) (1917–1998), American football center
- Tom Robertson (rugby union) (born 1994), Australian rugby union football player

== See also ==
- Robertson (surname)
