= Harriet Primrose, Countess of Rosebery =

British peeress

The Right Honourable The Countess of Rosebery and Midlothian
- Born: Harriet Clapham
- Occupation: Art consultant
- Spouse: Harry Primrose, 8th Earl of Rosebery (m. 2022)

Harriet Primrose, Countess of Rosebery and Midlothian (née Clapham), styled as Lady Dalmeny between 2022 and 2024, is a British art consultant and the second wife of Harry Primrose, 8th Earl of Rosebery and 4th Earl of Midlothian.

== Career ==
Clapham works as an art consultant specializing in contemporary and old master artworks. Her work includes attending major auctions, such as those at Christie’s and Sotheby’s, where she bids on behalf of clients. She has held positions at the Gagosian gallery in London and with Société Générale Private Bank in Zürich as an art adviser.

In 2021, Harriet and Sabine Getty were announced as co-chairs of the National Gallery’s inaugural young patrons programme. The initiative, referencing Hans Holbein’s The Ambassadors, is intended to engage younger audiences with the gallery’s collection and activities.

== Marriage ==
In June 2021, Harry Primrose, Lord Dalmeny announced that he was engaged to Harriet. They married at Barnbougle Castle in 2022.

After the death of her father-in-law, Neil Primrose, 7th Earl of Rosebery, in 2024, her husband succeeded to the earldom and she became the Countess of Rosebery and of Midlothian.

== Personal life ==
In February 2023, Lady Dalmeny attended the opening of Saatchi Yates’ new gallery space on Bury Street in St James’s, London. The launch featured a solo exhibition by artist Omar El Lahib and was attended by figures from the contemporary art and cultural communities. Following the exhibition, guests, including Lady Dalmeny, participated in a private dinner at Quaglino’s. In November, Harriet co-hosted the launch of the “St. Moritz Pops Up” event at Sotheby’s New Bond Street, alongside Irma Camperio Ciani. The event featured a curated showcase of St. Moritz-inspired fashion and design and included the unveiling of an exhibition by Swiss artist Rolf Sachs. Guests included members of European aristocracy and figures from the art and fashion worlds, such as Prince Philippos and Princess Nina of Greece and Denmark, Electra Niarchos, and Katrin Henkel.

In November 2024, she and Irma Camperio Ciani co-launched The Maison, a pop-up shop in collaboration with de Gournay, in Chelsea, London. Later in the year, Harriet and her husband attended a dinner party at the National Gallery held in celebration of the opening of the Francis Bacon: Human Presence exhibition, where they were joined by other notable figures including Boris Johnson, James Blunt, and Dame Hannah Rothschild, among others.

She and her husband attended the Sotheby's Royal & Noble Jewels sale, where Harry serves as chairman. The event included a candlelit dinner and was attended by notable guests such as the Marquess and Marchioness of Blandford, the Viscountess Chelsea, Viscount Newport, the Duke of Feria, actress Jameela Jamil, among others.

In 2025, the Countess attended an auction at the V&A Museum, where her husband, Harry, auctioned a stay at SHA Wellness Clinic as part of Borne’s Wonderland Gala. The event was attended by approximately 300 guests, including Borne’s patron, Princess Beatrice, and her husband, Edoardo Mapelli Mozzi. In May, Primrose attended the Royal Caledonian Ball at Grosvenor House with her husband. Guests included the Earl and Countess of Kinnoull, Lady Delphi Primrose, Archie Campbell, the Marquess of Lorne, and the Earl and Countess of Belfast.
