= Barnbougle Castle =

Tower house in Dalmeny, Scotland

- Dalmeny, Scotland
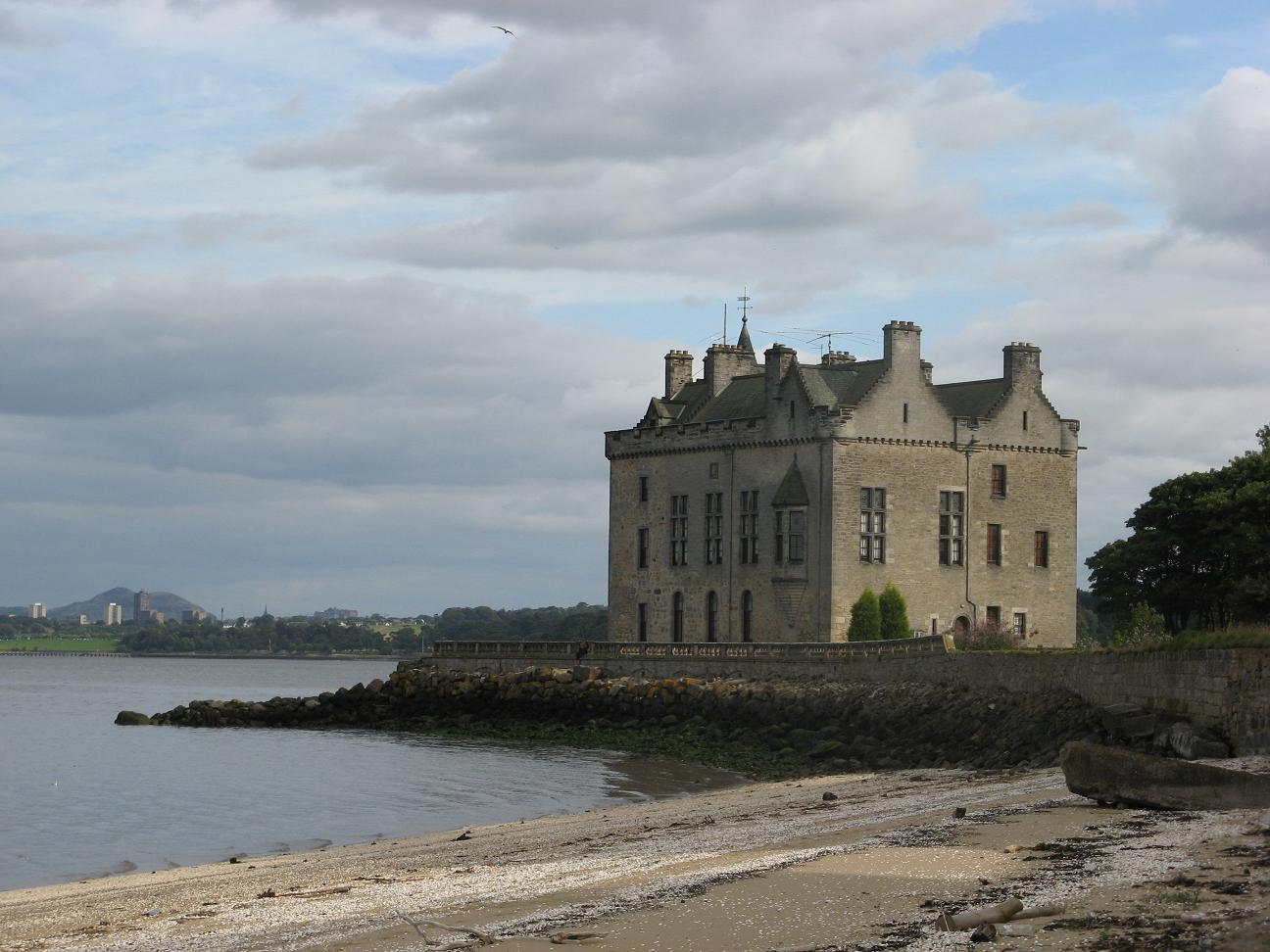
- Barnbougle Castle on the Firth of Forth, with Edinburgh in the distance

Site information
- Owner: Earl of Rosebery
- Condition: Rebuilt 1881, still in use

Location
- Location within City of Edinburgh
- Coordinates: 55.9924348°N 3.3342916°W

Site history
- Built: 13th century

Barnbougle Castle is a historic tower house on the southern shore of the Firth of Forth, between Cramond and Queensferry, and within the parish of Dalmeny. It lies within the Earl of Rosebery's estate, just north-west of Dalmeny House. Although its history goes back to the 13th century, the present castle is the result of rebuilding in 1881 by the 5th Earl of Rosebery, who served as Prime Minister from 1894 to 1895.

== Etymology ==
Older forms of the name include Barnbughall, Barbogle, Parnbogalle, and Pronbugele. This comes from the British brinn bugel, meaning 'shepherd's hill', or bar an bugel, 'shepherd's hill top', or alternatively pren bugel, 'shepherd's tree'. All these names likely refer to the high ground which rises immediately behind the shore, which overlooks the grazing around the mouth of the Cockle Burn.

== History ==
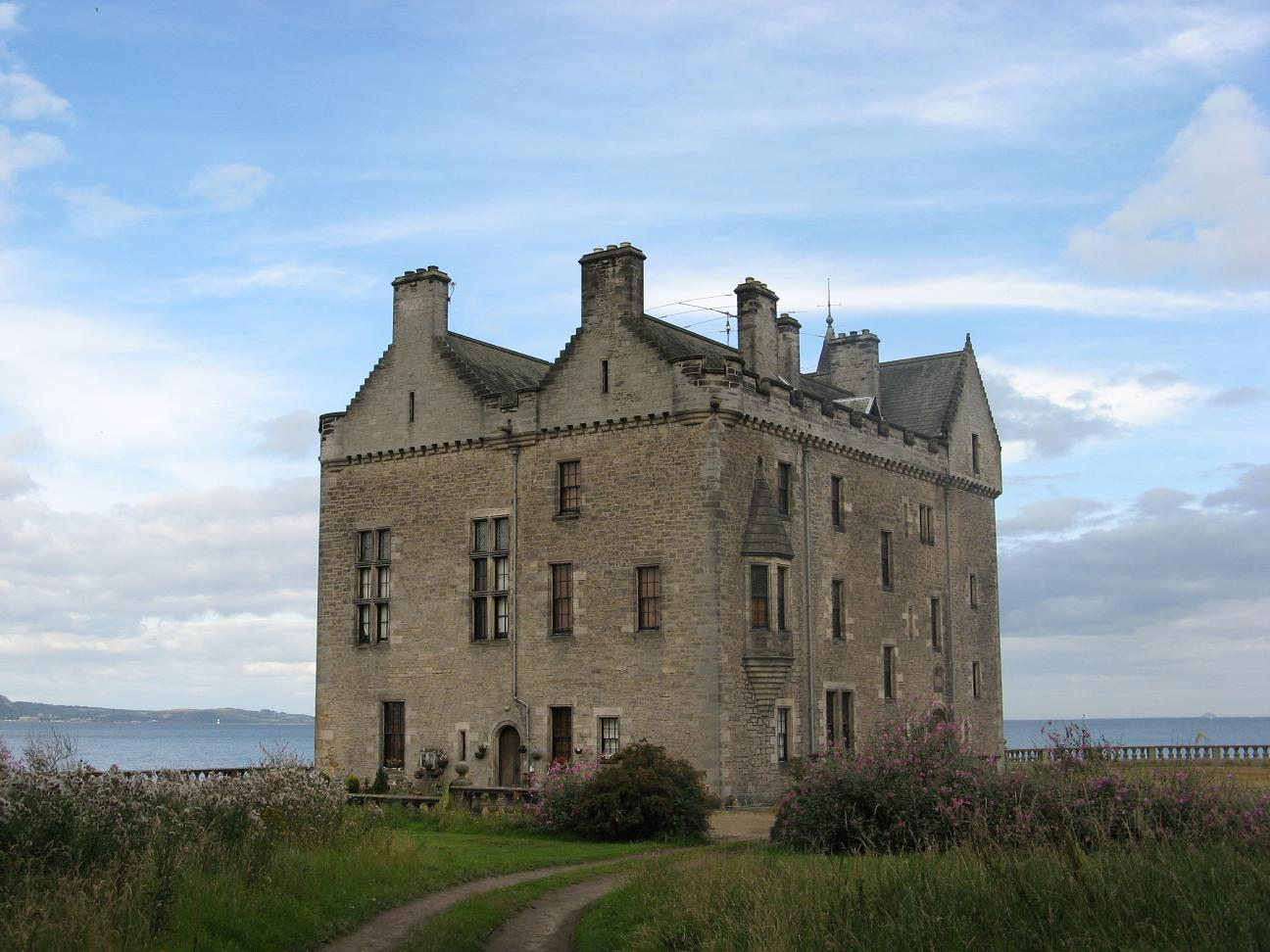
Barnbougle seen from the south-west

The first building at Barnbougle was a thirteenth-century tower house, constructed by the Mowbrays, a Norman family who were also lords of Dalmeny and Inverkeithing. Sir John Mowbray of Barnbougle, Laird of Dalmeny, was knighted by Sir Thomas Erskine at the battle of Homildon Hill in 1402.

The laird of Barnbougle in 1586, John Mowbray, was a supporter of Mary, Queen of Scots, his wife was a sister of William Kirkcaldy of Grange and two of their daughters served Mary in England. Gillis was betrothed to her apothecary, and Barbara married Gilbert Curll, the queen's secretary. It is thought that Mary gave Gillis Mowbray the jewellery now known as the "Penicuik Jewels".

The Links of Barnbougle was the scene of a judicial combat on 15 March 1597. James Carmichael had killed Stephen Bruntfield, Captain of Tantallon, in a duel on 22 December 1596. He was made to fight Adam Bruntfield in single combat at Barnbougle. The judges were the Duke of Lennox, the Laird of Buccleuch, and Sir James Sandilands. They wore lightweight clothes of satin and taffeta, one in blue, and one in red. Bruntfield killed Carmichael, according to some accounts in front of 5,000 spectators.

In 1615 the Mowbrays sold Barnbougle to Sir Thomas Hamilton, afterwards Earl of Haddington. It was sold again in 1662, by Sir Thomas' grandson, to Sir Archibald Primrose of Carrington, a senior judge who became Lord Justice General of Scotland in 1676. Sir Archibald's eldest son by his second marriage, also Archibald Primrose, was created Earl of Rosebery in 1703, and Barnbougle became the family seat. At some point during the 17th century, the original tower house was rebuilt or replaced.

In 1774, a plan for rebuilding the castle was drawn up by the architect Robert Adam. This proposal was for a triangular building, with the original tower at its seaward corner, but it was never executed. By the early 19th century, the castle had become dilapidated, and a wave supposedly washed into the dining room during supper. The 4th Earl of Rosebery had Dalmeny House constructed on the estate, and the family moved in on completion in 1817. Barnbougle was used to store explosives, and after being damaged in an accidental explosion, it was subsequently left as a ruin.

In 1881 the castle was entirely reconstructed and extended according to plans by James Maitland Wardrop, of Wardrop & Reid, in the Scots Baronial style. The older fabric of the north side was incorporated into the new building. It was primarily built to house the private library of Archibald, 5th Earl of Rosebery (1847–1929), who became Prime Minister in 1894. The collection specialised in Napoleonic as Rosebery was the author of Napoleon: The Last Phase. Lord Rosebery practised his speeches here, in a purpose-built gallery hall. Barnbougle remains a part of the Dalmeny Estate, and is still the property of the Rosebery family. It is a category A listed building.

== Description ==
The castle is built on a projecting rock terrace. It incorporates some of the fabric of the original castle on the north and east sides, but is mainly a late-nineteenth-century construction. There are three storeys and an attic; the building is rubble, dressed in ashlar sandstone. Features include crow-stepped gables, bartizans (small turrets) with water spouts on the two western corners and a crenellated parapet. A panel on the east wall is inscribed "Remove Not The Ancient Landmark Which Thy Fathers Have Set. Proverbs XXII.28". A 2.4-metre (7 ft 10 in) high obelisk sundial stands in the castle garden, having been moved there in 1890.

== Traditions ==
The antiquary William Wallace Fyfe recorded, in 1851, a legend associated with Barnbougle and nearby Hound Point. He relates that "whenever the death of any of its [Barnbougle's] lords is about to occur, the unwonted apparition of a black man, accompanied by a hound, appears upon the point, and winds from his bugle the death note of the baron. Hence the origin of the ancient name of Bar'n-bugle." Fyfe took the story as inspiration for a poem relating the adventures of "Sir Roger Mowbray" and his faithful dog on Crusade in the Holy Land, culminating in Sir Roger's death and closing with the words:

And ever when Barnbougle's lords
Are parting this scene below
Come hound and ghost to this haunted coast
With death notes winding slow.

A number of variations on this legend have been recorded, including versions where the baying of a hound, rather than a trumpet, precedes a death.
