= Dalmeny =

Village near Edinburgh, Scotland

Coordinates: 55.983°N 3.370°W

Dalmeny: Scottish Gaelic: Dùn Mheinidh
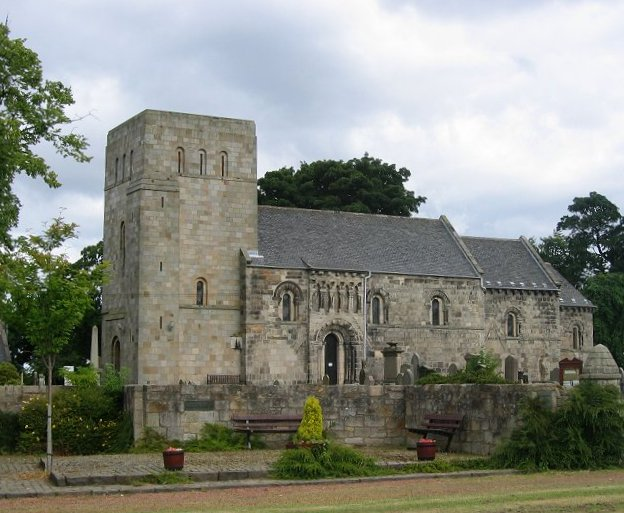
- Dalmeny Kirk, one of the finest Norman churches in Scotland

- Location within the City of Edinburgh council area Location within Scotland
- OS grid reference: NT1477
- Civil parish: Dalmeny
- Council area: City of Edinburgh
- Lieutenancy area: City of Edinburgh
- Country: Scotland
- Sovereign state: United Kingdom
- Post town: SOUTH QUEENSFERRY
- Postcode district: EH30
- Dialling code: 0131
- Police: Scotland
- Fire: Scottish
- Ambulance: Scottish
- UK Parliament: Edinburgh West
- Scottish Parliament: Edinburgh Western

Dalmeny (/dælˈmɛni/) is a village and civil parish in Scotland. It is located on the south side of the Firth of Forth, 1 mile (1.6 km) southeast of South Queensferry and 8 miles (13 km) west of Edinburgh city centre. It lies within the traditional boundaries of West Lothian, and falls under the local governance of the City of Edinburgh Council. Dalmeny is on the route used as the X99 Queensferry off-service loop.

== Name history ==
The 13th century form of the name, Dunmanyn (later Dunmanie and then Damenie, hence the modern form), indicates that the first element is Britonnic din or Gaelic dùn, a fort. A derivation from dùn Dùn nam Manach, "monk's fort", is unconvincing: there is no evidence to suggest there was ever a monastic settlement at Dalmeny. The name may rather be from din meyni, "stony fort", or din meyn an, "place of the stone fort", in reference to the ancient triple-walled fort that once stood on Craigie Hill in the east of the parish.

The second element has also been connected with Manau, an ancient name for the lands adjoining the Forth, which would give a meaning of "fort of Manau" (compare Slamannan, "mount of Manau", and Clackmannan, "stone of Manau").

== Infrastructure ==
The village has a primary school, which accommodates about 100 pupils, and a railway station near the south end of the Forth Railway Bridge, which also serves the larger town of Queensferry.

== Parish Church ==
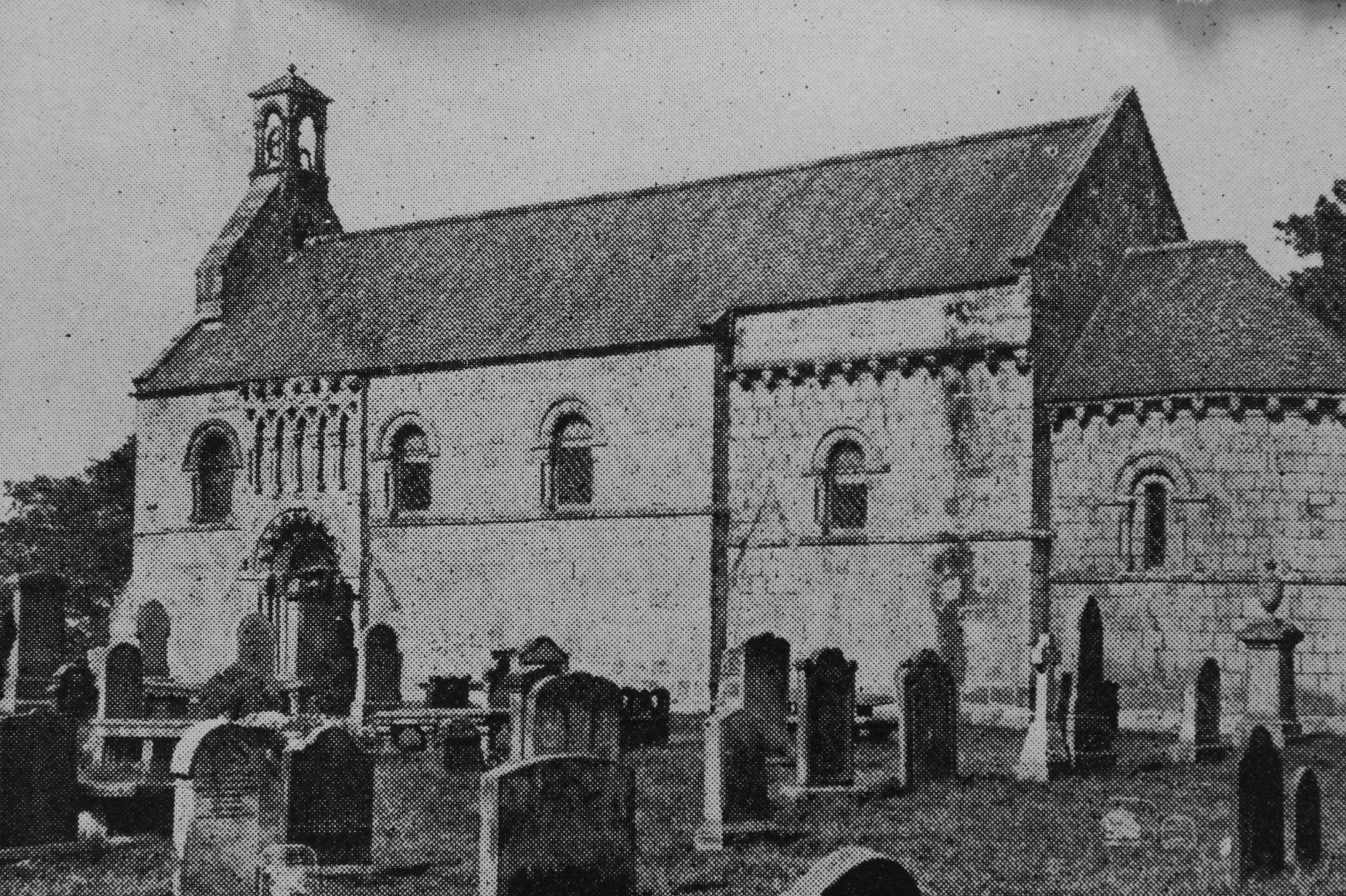
Dalmeny Church circa 1900

A timber chapel to St Adomnán may have existed since the 8th century. This was replaced by a stone church around 1130, probably by Gospatric, Earl of Dunbar, son of Waldeve, Lord of Allerdale, and the church had three altars: to St Cuthbert, St Bridget and Adomnán.

The church is recognised as the finest Norman/Romanesque parish church still in use in Scotland, and one of the most complete in the United Kingdom, lacking only its original western tower, which was replaced in a sympathetic style in 1937 having been long absent. The most notable feature is the ornate archway framing the small main entrance door on the south side. The aisleless nave, choir and apse survive almost complete from the 12th century. The refined sculptural detail of the chancel and apse arches is notable, as is a series of powerful beast-head corbels supporting the apse vault. These features are also extremely well preserved, with the original tool-marks still visible. The elaborate south doorway is carved with symbols representing a bestiary and an "agnus dei", enlivened with blind arcading above. The door is comparable to the north door at Dunfermline Abbey. Nearby is a rare 12th-century sarcophagus carved with 13 doll-like figures (possibly Christ and the 12 apostles) in niches (now very weathered). The churchyard also has a number of fine 17th- and 18th-century gravestones. Interments in the churchyard include the advocate and historian John Hill Burton (1809–81).

The north (Rosebery) aisle dates from 1671 and was remodelled in the late 19th century. This has elaborate but "inaccurate" Neo-Norman details. The church is a category A listed building.

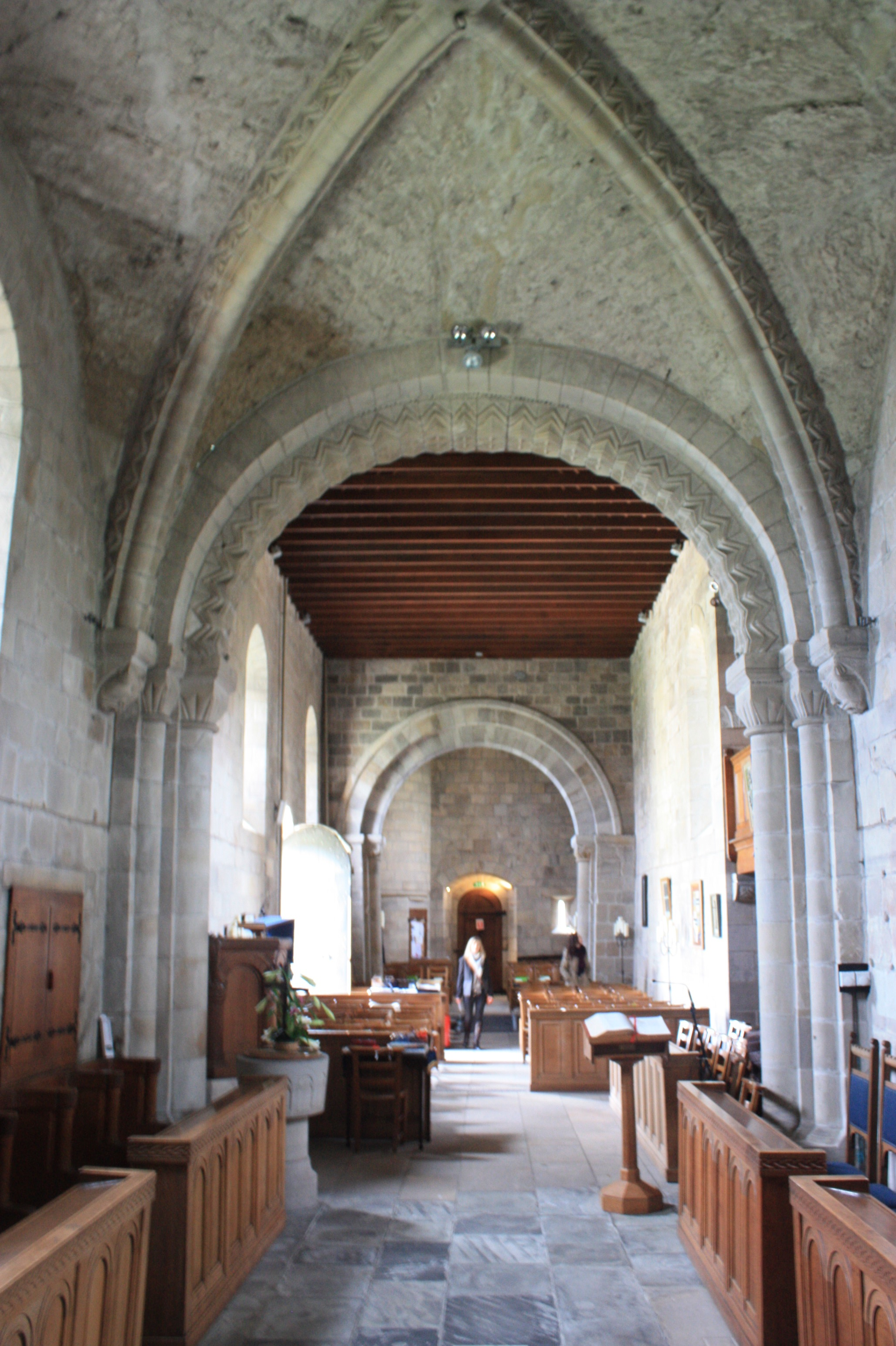
Dalmeny Kirk interior

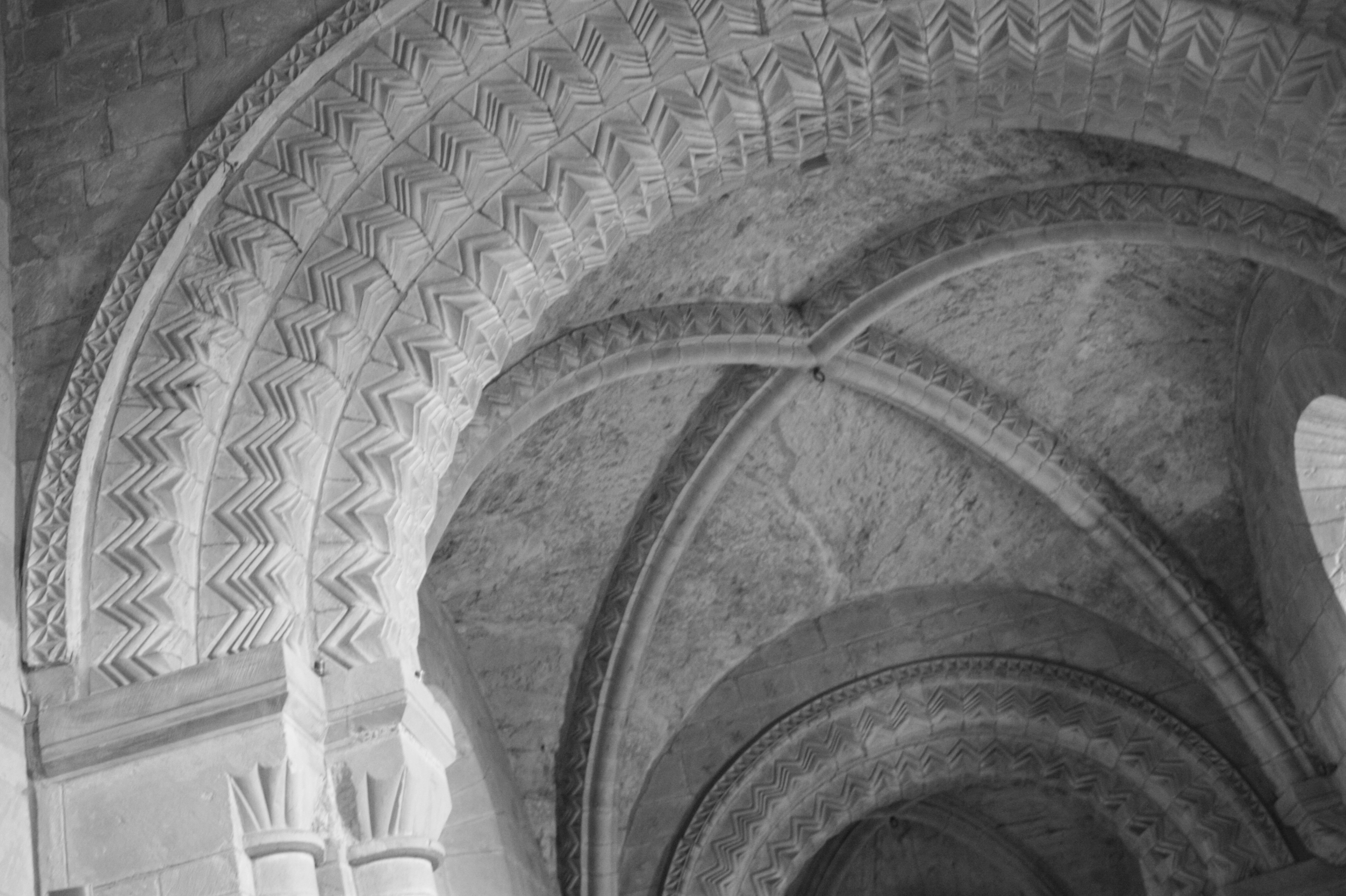
Fine 12th-century vaulting within Dalmeny Kirk

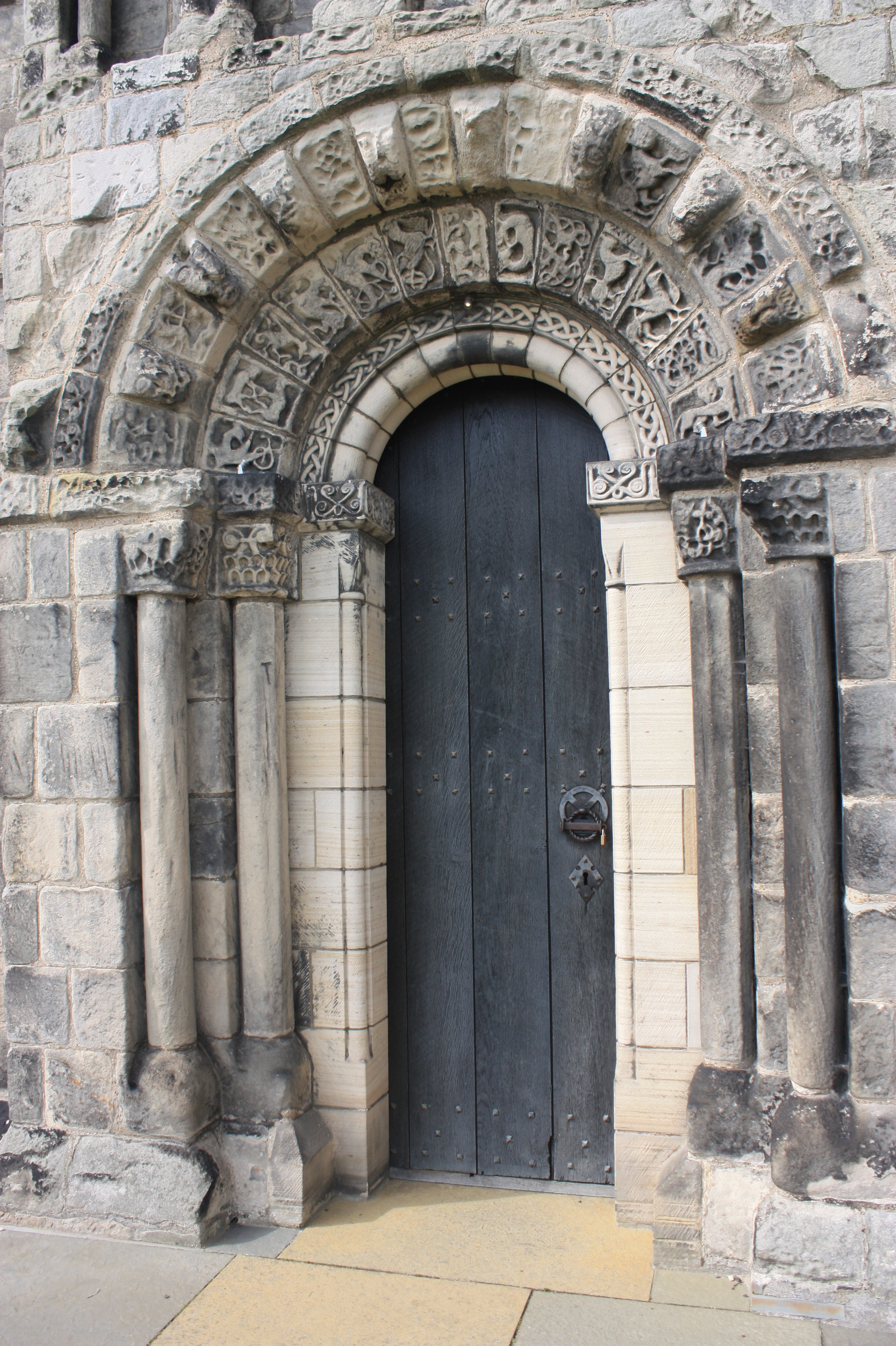
Well-detailed 12th-century entrance to Dalmeny Kirk

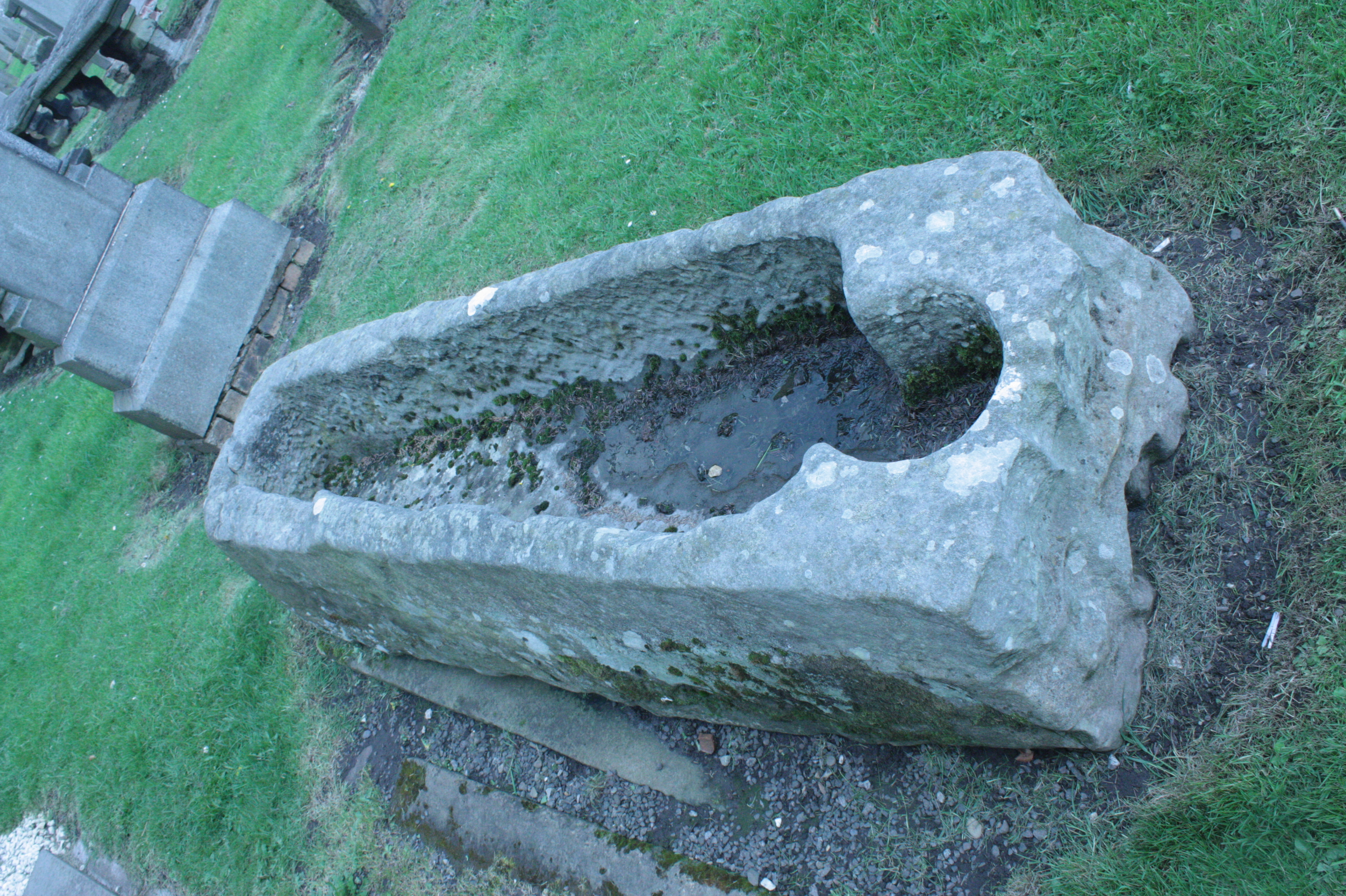
7th century stone coffin near the church entrance

== Location ==
When viewed from a distance the church appears to rise on a mound above the local topography. It is speculated that it is built on a pre-Christian burial mound. This would mean that the graveyard predates the church. A second detached mound of smaller size lies on the east road out of the village. This pre-dating is further evidenced by the 7th-century coffin stone near the door which appears to have been dug up during the 1937 restoration.

Besides the parish church, the most significant buildings are Dalmeny House and Barnbougle Castle, to the east of the village, home to the Earl of Rosebery. The most notable earl was Archibald, 5th Earl of Rosebery, who served as Prime Minister from 1894 to 1895 and is the grandfather of the present earl.

The village itself consists of early 19th-century cottages along the main street (built at the same time as Dalmeny House), with 20th-century housing to the south close to the A90. To the south of the A90 is the Dalmeny Tank Farm, a large oil-storage facility formerly operated by BP, but since 2018 by INEOS. The facility was constructed in the 1970s on a former oil shale mine, and is screened by a mound of the waste material from the mine. Oil is transferred from the site to tankers moored at the Hound Point Terminal in the Firth of Forth.

Dalmeny, along with Queensferry, Kirkliston, Cammo, Cramond, Barnton, Silverknowes, Gogar, Hermiston, and Newbridge, forms the Almond electoral ward of the City of Edinburgh Council.

== Notable people from Dalmeny ==
- John Chesser (1819–92), architect, was born in Dalmeny and later succeeded his father as clerk of works to the Dalmeny Estate.
- Archibald Primrose, 5th Earl of Rosebery (1847–1929), Prime Minister from 1894 to 1895.
- Lady Mary Shepherd, (1777–1847), philosopher.
- Sir Jack Stewart-Clark, Baronet (b. 1929), businessman and former Member of the European Parliament. Currently resident at Dundas Castle.
- Caroline, Lady Dalmeny, defence expert.
- Rev. Thomas Robertson (d. 1799) minister of Dalmeny, co-founder of the Royal Society of Edinburgh

== Bibliography ==
- Brailsford, Martyn, ed. (December 2017) [1987]. Railway Track Diagrams 1: Scotland & Isle of Man (6th ed.). Frome: Trackmaps. ISBN 978-0-9549866-9-8.
