= Diana Primrose =

Author of a eulogy to the deceased Queen Elizabeth (fl. 1630)

Diana Primrose (active c. 1630) was the author of a eulogy to the deceased Queen Elizabeth published as A Chaine of Pearle, Or a Memoriall of the peerless Graces, and Heroick Vertues of Queene Elizabeth of Glorious Memory. Composed by the Noble Lady, Diana Primrose (London, 1630). The work is made up of ten "Pearles" or short poems. As some of the poems describe virtues found in Elizabeth but some do not it is considered that they may represent social criticism, as well as a criticism of the then current ruler King James.

It is likely the poet used an allegorical pseudonym. The Primrose family was well established in Scotland at this time, though there is no record of a "Diana." Since no written documentation of the author's true identity exists, there is no consensus that this person was even female.

== Resources ==
- Greer, Germaine, et al., eds. "Diana Primrose." Kissing the Rod: an anthology of seventeenth-century women's verse. Farrar, Straus and Giroux, 1988. 83–89.
- anonymous. "Diana Primrose." Dictionary of Literary Biography 2008: 1–9.
- anonymous. "Given Names c. 1450–1650." 2010. Ancestry.com. April 2010
- Anonymous. "Pearls in Human History" 2010. American Museum of Natural History. April 2010
- —. "The Rich History of Pearls" 2006. Pearl Oasis. April 2010
- —. UNRV History. 2003–2010. April 2010 <>.
- Castelli, Jorge (2008). "Elizabeth 1 Queen of England". Tudor Place.
- Hopkins, Lisa. Maids and Mistresses, Cousins and Queens: Women's Alliances in Early Modern England. Shakespeare Studies (2001).
- Nichols, John. The Progresses and Public Processions of Queen Elizabeth. London: John Nichols and son, 1823.
- Primrose, Diana. "A Chaine of Pearle". Wynne-Davies, Marion. Women Poets of the Renaissance. London: J.M. Dent, 1998. 229–238, 328–337.
- Primrose, Diana. "A Chaine of Pearle". Helen Ostovich, Elizabeth Sauer. Reading Early Modern Women. London: Routledge, 2004. 380–381.
- Spenser, Edmund. The Faerie Queen. 1590. Early English Books Online. 7 April 2010
