= Harry Primrose, 8th Earl of Rosebery =

British aristocrat

The Right Honourable The Earl of Rosebery and Midlothian DL
- Born: Harry Ronald Neil Primrose; 20 November 1967 (age 58)
- Education: Trinity College, Cambridge
- Occupation: Auctioneer
- Spouse(s): Caroline Daglish (m. 1994; div. 2014) Harriet Clapham (m. 2022)
- Children: 5 (including Lady Delphi Primrose)
- Parent(s): Neil Primrose, 7th Earl of Rosebery; Deidre Reid

Harry Ronald Neil Primrose, 8th Earl of Rosebery, 4th Earl of Midlothian DL (born 20 November 1967), styled Lord Dalmeny between 1974 and 2024, known as Harry Dalmeny, is a British aristocrat and the Chairman of Sotheby's in the United Kingdom.

A member of the British aristocracy, he is the holder of ten noble titles, including the earldoms of Rosebery and Midlothian, to the Primrose family estate Dalmeny House, and to the chiefship of Clan Primrose.

Primrose is a Deputy Lieutenant for the county of Midlothian and is a member of the Royal Company of Archers.

== Early life and background ==
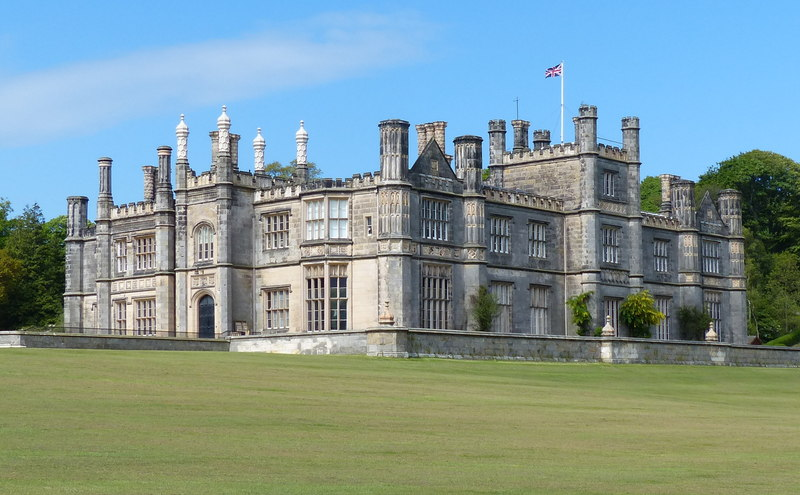
Dalmeny House in Scotland, the family seat of the earls of Rosebery

Harry Primrose was born in 1967, and is the son of Neil Primrose, 7th Earl of Rosebery. He is a great-grandson of Prime Minister Archibald Primrose, 5th Earl of Rosebery, and Hannah de Rothschild, the richest woman in Britain. The earls of Rosebery own Dalmeny House and also owned Mentmore Towers until 1977.

He was educated at the Dragon School, Oxford, and Eton College. He then studied art history at Trinity College, Cambridge.

== Career ==
Lord Dalmeny joined Sotheby's in 1990 to work in the Country House sale department. In 2000, he became a director of Sotheby's and from 2003 to 2007 was chairman of Sotheby's Olympia.

In 2001, Dalmeny sold his inherited Gilbert Stuart's 1796 George Washington (Landsdowne portrait) to the National Portrait Gallery at the Smithsonian Institution where it had been on indefinite loan since 1968. To prevent his auctioning it at Sotheby's, a U.S. donor paid the US$20 million that Primrose had requested from the Gallery.

He also took on responsibility for the single-owner sales department in 2006 and became deputy chairman, Sotheby's UK in 2007. He became chairman of Sotheby's in 2017.

As Sotheby's director of country house sales in the UK, Lord Dalmeny has been the auctioneer for some of the most high-profile auctions in Europe, including the Duke of Devonshire's sale at Chatsworth House and the 2004 record sale at Hopetoun House of Jack Vettriano's painting The Singing Butler for £744,800.

In 2014, the Primrose family sold the painting Rome, From Mount Aventine by J. M. W. Turner for £30.3m to fund restoration work on Dalmeny House. The painting, regarded as one of Turner's finest, had been bought by the Prime Minister Archibald Primrose in 1878.

In 2019, Dalmeny presided over the auction of Claude Monet's 1890 painting Meules for US$110.7 million at Sotheby's New York, a record for an impressionist work.

In 2025, Lord Rosebery took part in an auction at the V&A Museum, where he auctioned a stay at SHA Wellness Clinic during Borne’s Wonderland Gala. The event was attended by approximately 300 guests, including his wife, the Countess, as well as Borne’s patron, Princess Beatrice, and her husband, Edoardo Mapelli Mozzi.

== Personal life ==
In 2013, Lord Dalmeny rode in the Queen's carriage at Royal Ascot.

In late 2024, Rosebery attended a dinner party at the National Gallery with his wife, Harriet, held to celebrate the opening of the Francis Bacon: Human Presence exhibition. The event included other notable attendees such as Boris Johnson, James Blunt, and Dame Hannah Rothschild.

Lord Rosebery and his wife, the Countess, attended the Sotheby's Royal & Noble Jewels sale, where he serves as chairman. The event included a candlelit dinner and was attended by notable guests such as the Marquess and Marchioness of Blandford, the Viscountess Chelsea, Viscount Newport, the Duke of Feria, actress Jameela Jamil, among others.

== Marriages and issue ==
In 1994, Lord Dalmeny married Caroline Daglish, a former Conservative Party researcher working for Robert Jones MP and Lord Strathclyde. She is a Patroness of the Royal Caledonian Ball. They lived between London and Scotland, where he has a house and farm in the Moffat Hills. They have five children, including model and socialite Lady Delphi Primrose. They were reported to be divorcing in 2014.

In 2018, he was in a relationship with Norwegian shipping heiress Pontine Paus. He was also in a relationship with Martha Sitwell, Lady Sitwell.

In June 2021, Lord Dalmeny announced his engagement to art advisor Harriet Clapham. They married in 2022.

== Arms ==
Coat of arms of Harry Primrose, 8th Earl of Rosebery
Crest A demi-lion gules holding in the dexter paw a primrose or. Escutcheon Quarterly: 1st and 4th, vert, three primroses within a double tressure flory counterflory or (Primrose); 2nd and 3rd, Argent, a lion rampant, double queued sable (Cressy). Supporters Two lions or. Motto Fide et fiducia (By fidelity and confidence).

Peerage of Scotland
Preceded by Neil Primrose	Earl of Rosebery; 2024–present	Incumbent; Heir: Albert Primrose, Lord Dalmeny
Peerage of the United Kingdom
Preceded by Neil Primrose	Earl of Midlothian; 2024–present	Incumbent; Heir: Albert Primrose, Lord Dalmeny
