= Daniel P. Franklin =

American political scientist (born 1954)

- Born: Daniel Paul Franklin; 1954 (age 70–71); Mount Vernon, New York, U.S.
- Education: University of California, Los Angeles (BA); University of Texas at Austin (MA, PhD)
- Occupation: Political scientist

Daniel Paul Franklin (born 1954) is an American political scientist and Associate Professor of political science at Georgia State University in Atlanta, Georgia.

Franklin was born in Mount Vernon, New York and grew up in Austin, Texas. He received a BA in political science in 1976 from the University of California, Los Angeles. He obtained an MA and a PhD from the University of Texas, Austin in the years 1981 and 1984, respectively. He taught at Colgate University from 1985 to 1990, and was an APSA Congressional Fellow from 1990 to 1991. He then obtained his present position at Georgia State.

== Publications ==
- Franklin, Daniel P. Extraordinary Measures: The Exercise of Prerogative Powers in the United States. Pittsburgh, PA: University of Pittsburgh Press, 1991. According to WorldCat, the book is held in 432 libraries.

Review by Elliot Bartky The Review of Politics, v56 n01 (19941205)

- Franklin, Daniel P. (1993). Making ends meet : congressional budgeting in the age of deficits. Washington, D.C. : CQ Press, c1993.

Review, by Jean Slemmons Stratford; Juri Stratford; Anne Liebst Journal of Government Information, v21 n4 (1994): 370-372
Review, by Christopher B Wlezien, The Journal of Politics, v56 n4 (1994 11): 1160-1161

- Franklin, Daniel P., and Michael J. Baun. Political Culture and Constitutionalism: A Comparative Approach. Armonk, N.Y.: M.E. Sharpe, 1995. According to WorldCat, the book is held in 377 libraries.

Review, by P Rich Southeastern Political Review, 24, no. 2, (1996): 374

- Franklin, Daniel P. Politics and Film: The Political Culture of Film in the United States. Lanham: Rowman & Littlefield Publishers, 2006. 2nd ed., 2017.

Review, by Doris A Graber Political Science Quarterly, v121 n4 (20061225): 728-730
Review, by R Lawrence, Political Communication, 24, no. 4, (2007): 442-444

- Franklin, Daniel P. Pitiful Giants: Presidents in Their Final Terms New York: Palgrave Macmillan, 2014.
