= Clan Primrose =

Lowland Scottish clan

- Motto: Fide et Fiducia (By Faith And By Trust)

Chief
- The Right Honourable Harry
- Earl of Rosebery and Midlothian
- Seat: Dalmeny House

Clan Primrose is a Lowland Scottish clan.

== History ==
=== Origins ===
The surname derives from the lands of Primrose in the parish of Dunfermline, Fife. The farmstead stood at the junction of Grange Road and Primrose Lane in what is now a housing estate in the town of Rosyth. The name itself may come from the Pictish words *pren, "tree", and *ros, "moor", or the first element may be *prim, "first".

The earliest recorded ancestor of the Earls of Rosebery is Henry Primrose, born sometime prior to 1490, who lived in the neighbourhood of Culross Abbey. Henry's son was Gilbert Primrose (surgeon), (c.1535 -18 April 1616), who became Surgeon to King James VI of Scotland.

=== 17th century and Civil War ===
Gilbert's son was Gilbert Primrose (minister) (1580?–1641), one of the Ministers of the reformed church at Bordeaux, and afterwards of the French Protestant Church of London. He was appointed Chaplain to King James VI of Scotland (later also King of England and King of Ireland) and Charles I of England. In 1628 he became Dean of Windsor. A grandson of Henry was James Primrose (d. 1641) who was Clerk of the Privy Council of Scotland and was the second son of Archibald Primrose of Culross and of Burnbrae, Perthshire (c.1538–?), by Margaret Bleau of Castlehill, Perthshire. By his first wife, Sibylla Miller, James had a son Gilbert, and six daughters, of whom Alison became the second wife of George Heriot [q. v.], jeweller to James VI. By his second wife, Catharine, daughter of Richard Lawson of Boghall, he had six daughters and six sons, including Archibald.

James Primrose died in 1641 and was succeeded in the office of Clerk to the Privy Council of Scotland by his son, Archibald Primrose, Lord Carrington who supported the royalist James Graham, 1st Marquess of Montrose. He joined Montrose after his victory at the Battle of Kilsyth. Archibald Primrose was the king's lieutenant at the Battle of Philiphaugh where he was captured. He was tried and found guilty of treason, and although his life was spared, he was held in prison until Montrose was ordered by Charles I to disband his army and leave the kingdom. Primrose was later released and knighted by the king.

In 1648 he joined in the Engagers, a scheme to rescue Charles I from the English Parliamentarians, and although the plan was a failure, he survived to join Charles II of England on his march into England in 1651 and fought at the Battle of Worcester. Charles made him a baronet. The king fled into exile and the Primrose estates were sequestrated.

The Primrose estates were restored after the Restoration of 1660, and Primrose was appointed a judge of the Supreme Court and Lord Clerk Register of Scotland. He took the title, "Lord Carrington" and was opposed to the policies of the Duke of Lauderdale. Primrose resigned his offices, but from 1676 to 1678 he was Lord Justice General. Later he acquired the barony of Barnbougle and Dalmeny which remains the seat of the family to this day.

=== 18th century ===
The Lord Justice General was succeeded by his son, Sir William Primrose, and his son, Sir James Primrose of Carrington, was elected Commissioner of Parliament for Edinburgh in 1703. In November of the same year he was elevated to the peerage as Viscount Primrose.

The second Viscount died unmarried in 1706, and his brother, Hugh, the third Viscount, left no issue. Archibald Primrose, (b.1664) was the only son by the second marriage of Sir Archibald, the Lord Justice General, who left to him the estate of Dalmeny. He was appointed a Gentleman of the Bedchamber after the accession of William of Orange. From 1695 to 1700 he was Commissioner of Parliament for Edinburgh. He was also created Viscount of Rosebery, Lord Primrose and Dalmeny. On the accession of Anne, Queen of Great Britain he was advanced to the rank of earl.

He was a Privy Councillor in 1707 and was appointed as a commissioner for the Treaty of Union. He was one of the sixteen peers elected to represent Scotland in the House of Lords after the union.

Sir Archibald Primrose was of Dunipace was executed in 1746 for being a Jacobite.

The third Earl was a representative peer, and he was made a Knight of the Thistle in 1771.

=== 19th century ===
Archibald John, as fourth Earl of Rosebery was a Member of Parliament for Hellston and later Carlisle and was created a baron of the United Kingdom with the title of 'Lord Rosebery' in 1828. In 1840, like his father, he was made a Knight of the Thistle. Three years later he was appointed Lord Lieutenant of Linlithgowshire.

== Castle ==
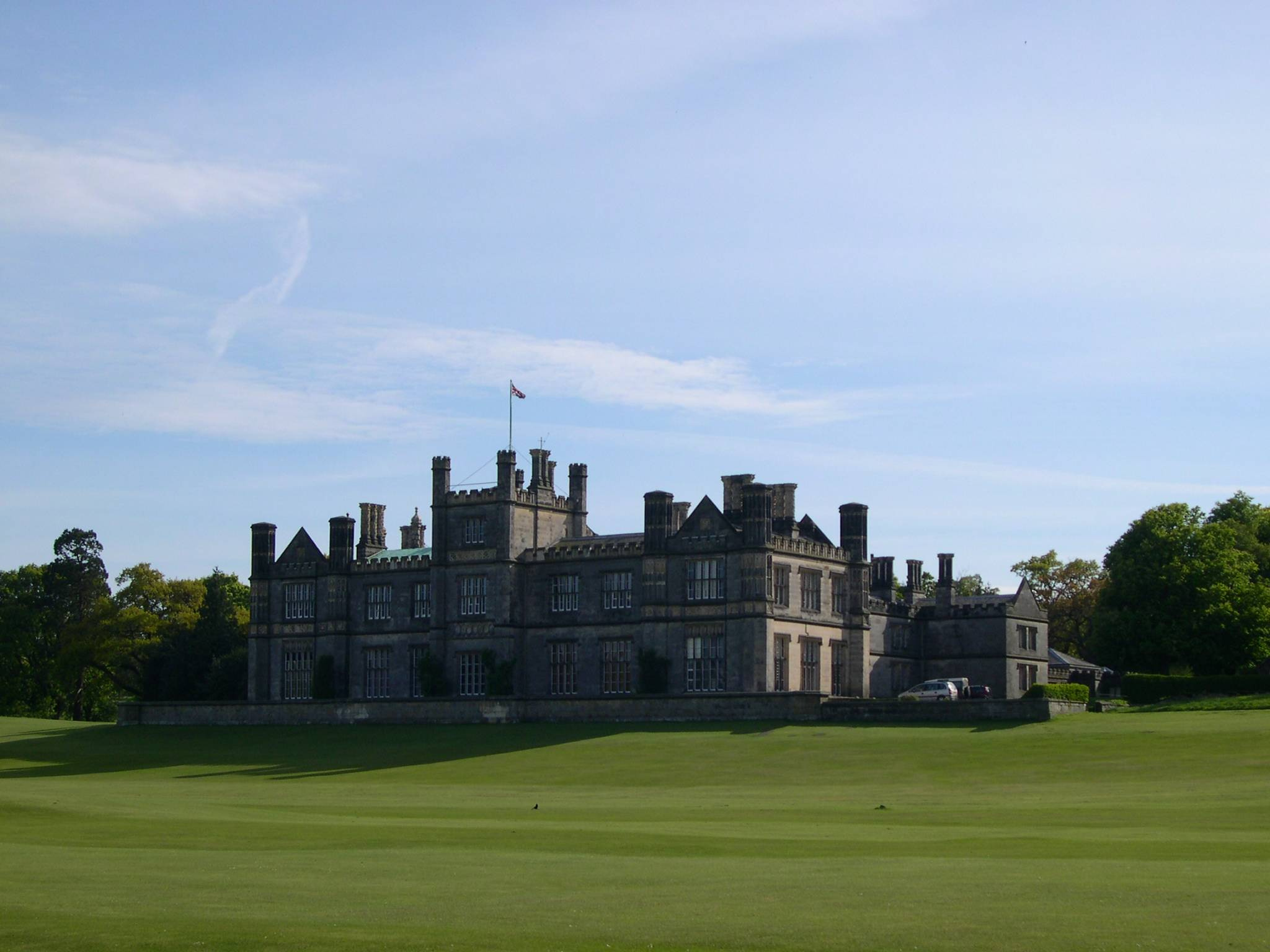
Dalmeny House

The seat of the Chief of Clan Primrose is at Dalmeny House in West Lothian on the Firth of Forth in Scotland.

== Clan Chief ==
The current Chief of Clan Primrose is Harry Primrose, 8th Earl of Rosebery

== See also ==
- Earl of Rosebery
- Scottish clan
