= Caroline, Lady Dalmeny =

British former defence policy analyst

Caroline, Lady Dalmeny FRSA FRGS
- Born: Caroline J. Daglish; Hemel Hempstead, Hertfordshire, England
- Education: University College London
- Board member of: British-American Project, Royal United Services Institute
- Spouse: Harry Primrose, Lord Dalmeny (m. 1994; div. 2014)
- Children: 5

Caroline Julia, Lady Dalmeny FRSA FRGS (née Daglish; born 1969) is a British former defence policy analyst. Lady Dalmeny was married to Harry Primrose, Lord Dalmeny. They were reported to be divorcing in 2014.

== Career ==
Caroline, Lady Dalmeny is an Associate Fellow of the Royal United Services Institute (RUSI), a think tank engaged in defence and security research, a Fellow of the Royal Society of Arts, and a senior associate at the Royal Society of Medicine. She was formerly Associate Director of the Henry Jackson Society, a British cross-party think tank concerned with foreign and defence policy. She is a former trustee of the War Memorials Trust.

She is a fellow and on the Executive Council of the British-American Project (BAP), a leadership organisation that supports the UK/US relationship. She sits on the Center for Strategic and International Studies (CSIS) track II Nuclear Trilateral Dialogue between France, the UK and the USA.

She is a Patron and former Chairman of the Royal Caledonian Ball, and she has been photographed in the Royal Ascot carriage procession. In April 2015, Caroline, Lady Dalmeny was named in the Tatler Magazine Popularity Power 100 list.

She became a Fellow of the Royal Geographical Society in January 2022.

She has been a member of the Conservative Party since 1988.

As of September 2022, Caroline, Lady Dalmeny was appointed as Chair of the Museum of the Home by the Secretary of State.

== Personal life ==
According to Debrett's Peerage & Baronetage, she is the daughter of Ronald Daglish and Mrs. William Wyatt-Lowe, of Hemel Hempstead.

From 1994 to 2014, she was married to Harry Primrose, Lord Dalmeny, and they have five children. She and her long term partner now divide their time between homes in London and Scotland.
