= Primrose (given name) =

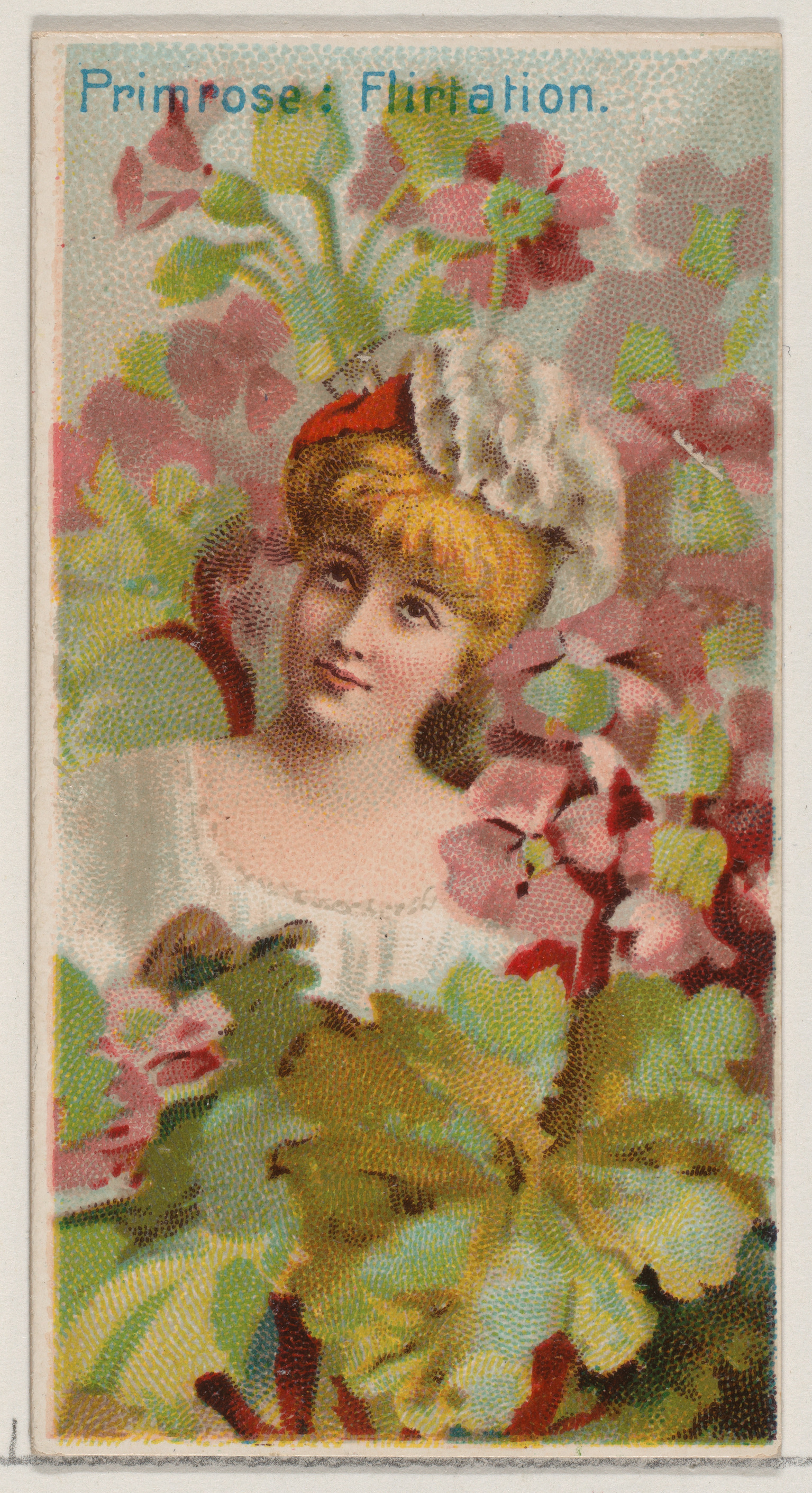
- The primrose flower is said to signify flirtation in the language of flowers.
- Gender: Female
- Language: English

Origin
- Meaning: primrose flower

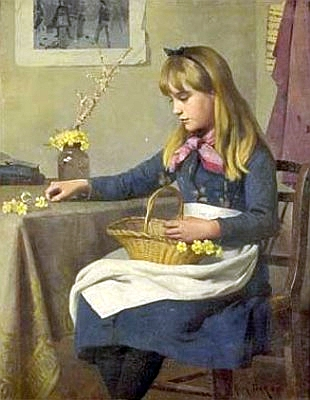
Primrose Day by Ralph Todd, 1885. The date commemorated the 1881 death of British statesman Benjamin Disraeli, whose favorite flower was the primrose.

Primrose is an English feminine given name given in reference to the flower. The common name for the flower comes from the Latin phrase prima rosa, or first rose. It is also an English or Scottish surname. As a given name, it was occasionally used as a transferred use of the surname for both boys and girls. It came into vogue in the Victorian era and first part of the 20th century, especially in the United Kingdom, along with other plant and flower names for girls. More attention has been given to the name in the Anglosphere due to a character in The Hunger Games books by Suzanne Collins and the movies based on the books.

== Usage ==
In recent years, the name has ranked among the top 1,000 names for newborn girls in England and Wales since 2012 and among the top 200 names for British girls since 2021. The name has never ranked among the 1,000 most popular names for girls in the United States, but has also increased in usage there. In 2022, 87 newborn American girls were named Primrose. Fifteen newborn Canadian girls were given the name in 2021.

== Notable women with the name ==
- Anoka Primrose Abeyrathne, Sri Lankan conservationist, social entrepreneur, and activist on sustainable development issues who served as the Asia-Pacific representative to UNHabitat YAB
- Primrose Adams (1926–2020), Canadian First Nations artist
- Primrose Archer (born 2000), English fashion model
- Primrose Bogatsu, South African politician
- Primrose Bordier (1929–1995), French designer
- Primrose Cumming (1915–2004), British author of books for children
- Marguerite Primrose Gerrard (1922–1993), Jamaica-born American botanical artist
- Primrose Rupp Hinton (1889–1969), American journalist
- Primrose McConnell (1906–1991), Irish missionary in Haiti
- Primrose Pitman (1902–1998), British artist
- Primrose Potter (born 1931), Australian philanthropist and arts administrator
- Primrose Sonti (born 1961), South African politician

== Notable men with the name ==
- Primrose McConnell (1856–1931), English author, farmer and member of the Royal Agricultural Society

== People with surname ==
- Archibald Philip Primrose (1847–1929), 5th Earl of Rosebery, British Liberal statesman and Prime Minister from 1894 to 1895
