= Harry Primrose, 6th Earl of Rosebery =

British politician (1882–1974)

The Right Honourable The Earl of Rosebery KT DSO MC PC FRSE

Secretary of State for Scotland
- In office 23 May 1945 – 26 July 1945
- Monarch: George VI
- Prime Minister: Winston Churchill
- Preceded by: Thomas Johnston
- Succeeded by: Joseph Westwood

Member of the House of Lords Lord Temporal
- In office 21 May 1929 – 31 May 1974; Hereditary peerage
- Preceded by: The 5th Earl of Rosebery
- Succeeded by: The 7th Earl of Rosebery

Member of Parliament for Midlothian
- In office 8 February 1906 – 10 February 1910
- Preceded by: Alexander Murray
- Succeeded by: Alexander Murray

Personal details
- Born: 8 January 1882
- Died: 31 May 1974 (aged 92)
- Party: Liberal; National Liberal
- Spouses: Dorothy Grosvenor (m. 1909; div. 1919) Eva Strutt (m. 1924)
- Children: 3, including Ronald and Neil
- Parent(s): Archibald Primrose, 5th Earl of Rosebery; Hannah de Rothschild
- Cricket career

Cricket information
- Batting: Right-handed
- Bowling: Right-arm fast

Career statistics
Competition	First-class
Matches	102
Runs scored	3,551
Batting average	22.47
100s/50s	2/19
Top score	138
Balls bowled	131
Wickets	3
Bowling average	33.33
5 wickets in innings	0
10 wickets in match	0
Best bowling	2/16
Catches/stumpings	50/–
- Source: CricketArchive, 8 May 2022

Albert Edward Harry Meyer Archibald Primrose, 6th Earl of Rosebery, 2nd Earl of Midlothian, KT, DSO, MC, PC, FRSE (8 January 1882 – 31 May 1974), styled Lord Dalmeny until 1929, was a British Liberal politician who briefly served as Secretary of State for Scotland in 1945. He was the Member of Parliament for Midlothian from 1906 to 1910. He became the Earl of Rosebery and Midlothian in 1929 and was thus a member of the House of Lords until his death.

== Early life ==
He was born at Dalmeny House west of Edinburgh on 8 January 1882. His parents were Archibald Primrose, 5th Earl of Rosebery, Liberal Prime Minister of the United Kingdom (from 1894 to 1895) and Hannah Primrose, Countess of Rosebery, a member of the Rothschild family. He was the brother of Neil Primrose and the writer Lady Sybil Grant.

He was educated at Eton then undertook military training at the Royal Military College, Sandhurst.

== Career ==
Lord Dalmeny was commissioned into the Grenadier Guards as a Second lieutenant 12 February 1902.

During the First World War, he served in France from 1914 to 1917 as Camp Commandant and ADC to General Allenby and subsequently in Palestine as Allenby's Military Secretary.

=== Cricket and horse racing ===
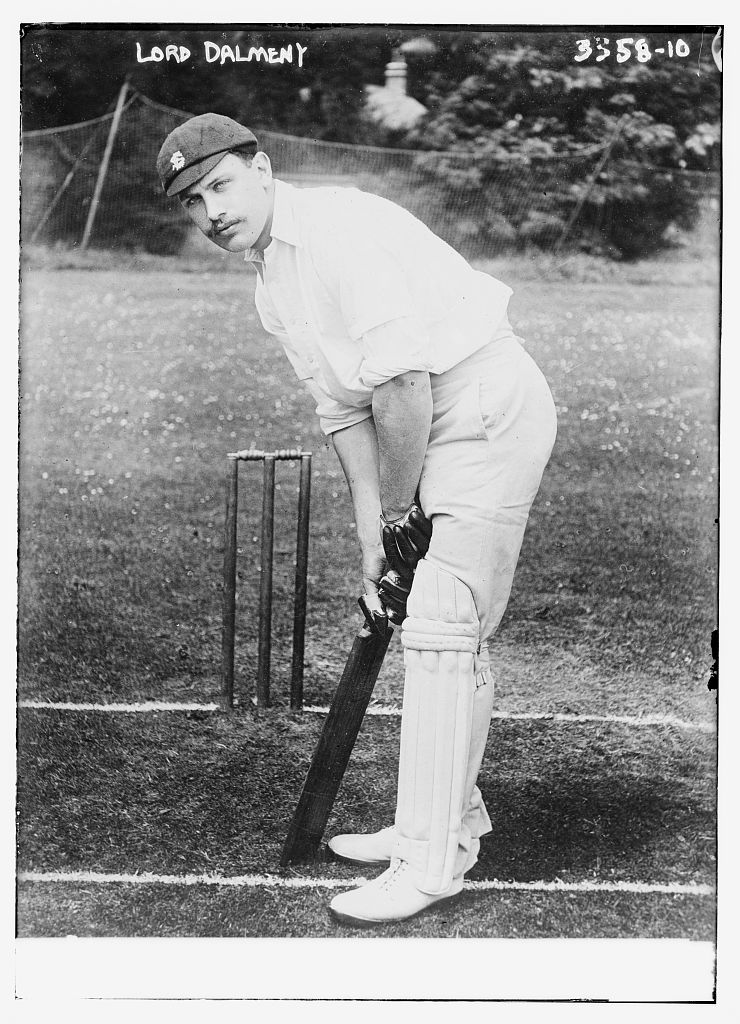
Primrose playing cricket

As Lord Dalmeny he was a prominent cricketer. He played two first-class matches for Middlesex in 1902. He served as captain of Surrey from 1905 to 1907. He played in 102 first-class matches in all, scoring 3551 runs at an average of 22.47, including two centuries. His highest score was 138 against Leicestershire in 1905, when he added 260 for the sixth wicket in 130 minutes with J. N. Crawford. He was a hitter of notable power and though never consistent he could on occasions "knock the best bowling all over the field", as when he hit 58 against Nottinghamshire on a difficult wicket at The Oval in 1905. Against Essex in 1906 he scored 52 in 37 minutes in the first innings and 58 not out in 45 minutes in the second. In 1907, he resigned the Surrey captaincy because of conflicts with his parliamentary duties.

Rosebery was also a notable racehorse breeder and owner. He owned the Mentmore and Crafton Studs, which had been gifted to him by his father in 1922. His most successful horse was Blue Peter, which in 1939 won the Two Thousand Guineas, the Blue Riband, the Eclipse Stakes and the Epsom Derby. Another of his horses, Ocean Swell, sired by Blue Peter, won the 1944 Derby and the 1945 Ascot Gold Cup. Rosebery was elected to the Jockey Club in 1924, and later became president of the Thoroughbred Breeders' Association. He donated the prize money from his 1944 Derby and 1945 Ascot Gold Cup wins as seed money to help launch the Edinburgh International Festival.

=== Political career ===
At the age of 21, at the insistence of his father, he reluctantly resigned his commission to stand as Liberal candidate for Midlothian (which was also known as Edinburghshire), where the Roseberys had long been prominent landowners. He was elected in the Liberal landslide in the 1906 election, one of almost 400 Liberals to be returned, and, at the age of 24, the youngest serving MP. He chose not to stand in the 1910 election, stating in a letter to his agent that his "politics are not far enough advanced to meet the views of the Liberal Party as at present constituted."

An obituary in The Times described him as a "dutiful rather than an enthusiastic participant in party politics", firmly resisting pressure to return to the House of Commons after the war.

Rosebery entered the House of Lords on the death of his father in 1929, taking his seat as the second Earl of Midlothian, a title bestowed on his father in 1911 but never used. He continued to be known as the Sixth Earl of Rosebery.

The same year he was appointed Lord Lieutenant of Midlothian, a post he held until 1964.

In 1938 he was elected a Fellow of the Royal Society of Edinburgh. His proposers were Hugh Macmillan, Baron Macmillan, Sir Thomas Henry Holland, James Pickering Kendall and James Watt.

In February 1941, during the Second World War, he was appointed Regional Commissioner for Civil Defence in Scotland. When the wartime coalition government broke up in 1945, Winston Churchill formed a caretaker administration to hold office until the 1945 general election. The new government was composed of members of the Conservative Party and the small groups which had allied with it in the National governments in office 1931–1940. Amongst these allies was the National Liberal Party to which Rosebery belonged.

One of the most unexpected appointments Churchill made was to install Rosebery as a member of the Privy Council and Secretary of State for Scotland. Both men had served together in the Liberal Parliamentary Party in the 1906–1910 Parliament. The caretaker Ministry was in office May to July 1945. So brief was his tenure at the Scottish Office that during the Royal Commission on Scottish Affairs (1952–4) he declined to give evidence on the grounds that he did not know what to say. Reputedly, his last words prior to his departing from the Scottish Office were "Well. I didn't make a bad job of this, did I? Didn't have the time".

=== Later life ===
He was created a Knight of the Order of the Thistle (KT) in 1947 by King George VI. Rosebery was President of the National Liberal Party 1945–1957. From 1951 to 1974 he was the president of the influential Scottish conservation organisation the Cockburn Association. He was appointed Chairman of the Royal Fine Art Commission for Scotland in 1952. He also served as president of the Royal Scottish Corporation. He was a member of the royal commission on justices of the peace (1946–8) and was himself a JP for many years.

== Personal life ==
In 1909, Harry Primrose married Dorothy Alice Margaret Augusta Grosvenor, daughter of Lord Henry George Grosvenor (a son of the 1st Duke of Westminster) and Dora Mina Erskine-Wemyss. Before their divorce in 1919, they had a son and a daughter:

- Archibald Ronald Primrose, Lord Dalmeny (1910–1931), a 2nd Lieutenant in the General List.
- Lady Helen Dorothy Primrose (1913–1998), who married Major Hon. Hugh Adeane Vivian Smith, son of Vivian Smith, 1st Baron Bicester and Lady Sybil Mary McDonnell (a daughter of the 6th Earl of Antrim), in 1933.

In 1924 Primrose remarried to Dame Eva Isabel Marian Strutt, a daughter of Henry Bruce, 2nd Baron Aberdare. They were the parents of two children, only one of whom survived:

- Neil Archibald Primrose, 7th Earl of Rosebery (1929–2024), who married Alison Mary Deirdre Reid, daughter of Ronald William Reid, in 1955.
- Lady Mary Primrose (1935–1935), who died at birth.

Lord Rosebery died at Mentmore Towers in Buckinghamshire on 30 May 1974 and was succeeded in his titles by his younger son, Neil.

== Arms ==
Coat of arms of Harry Primrose, 6th Earl of Rosebery
Crest A demi-lion gules holding in the dexter paw a primrose or. Escutcheon Quarterly: 1st and 4th, vert, three primroses within a double tressure flory counterflory or (Primrose); 2nd and 3rd, Argent, a lion rampant, double queued sable (Cressy). Supporters Two lions or. Motto Fide et fiducia (By fidelity and confidence). Orders The Most Ancient and Most Noble Order of the Thistle.

== Sources ==
- Who's Who of British Members of Parliament, Vol. II: 1886–1918, edited by M. Stenton and S. Lees (The Harvester Press 1978)
- Pottinger, George, The Secretaries of State for Scotland, 1926-1976 (Scottish Academic Press, 1979)
- Torrance, D., The Scottish Secretaries (Birlinn, 2006)
- Young, Kenneth, Harry, Lord Rosebery (Hodder & Stoughton, 1974) ISBN 978-0-340-19035-7

Parliament of the United Kingdom
Preceded by The Master of Elibank	Member of Parliament for Midlothian; 1906 – 1910	Succeeded by The Master of Elibank
Political offices
Preceded by Thomas Johnston	Secretary of State for Scotland; 1945	Succeeded by Joseph Westwood
Honorary titles
Preceded by The Earl of Rosebery	Lord Lieutenant of Midlothian; 1929–1964	Succeeded by Sir Maxwell Inglis, 9th Baronet
Peerage of Scotland
Preceded by Archibald Primrose	Earl of Rosebery; 1929–1974	Succeeded by Neil Primrose
Peerage of the United Kingdom
Preceded by Archibald Primrose	Earl of Midlothian; 1929–1974	Succeeded by Neil Primrose
