= George Brock (journalist) =

British academic

- Born: 7 November 1951 (age 74)
- Citizenship: United Kingdom
- Education: Corpus Christi College, Oxford
- Known for: F5
- Scientific career
- Workplaces: Yorkshire Evening Press, The Observer, The Times, City University London

George Brock (born 7 November 1951) is a professor of journalism at City, University of London. He held the position of head of department from September 2009 to September 2014.

== Career ==
After beginning his career in 1973 as a reporter for the Yorkshire Evening Press, Brock was a journalist for The Observer (1976–1981) and The Times (1981–2008), where he held positions from foreign correspondent to managing editor.

== Other responsibilities ==
Brock has been President of the World Editors Forum (2004–2008) where he still sits as a board member. He was also a member of the board for The Times Newspapers Ltd (1997–2004) and has frequently written for papers in the US, Poland, Sweden and Timbuktu.

== Books ==
- Trelford, Donald; Brock, George (1980). Siege six days at the Iranian Embassy. New York: Macmillan. ISBN 0-333-30951-0.
- Brock, George; Wapshott, Nicholas (1983). Thatcher. London: Macdonald. ISBN 0-356-09503-7.
- Brock, George (2013). Out of Print: Newspapers, Journalism and the Business of News in the Digital Age. Kogan Page. ISBN 978-0749466510.
