= Primrose, Ohio =

Unincorporated community in Ohio, U.S.

Coordinates: 41°40′49″N 84°26′13″W

Primrose is an unincorporated community in Williams County, in the U.S. state of Ohio.

== History ==
A post office called Primrose was established in 1854, and remained in operation until 1904. With the construction of the railroad, business activity shifted to nearby Alvordton, and the town's population dwindled.
