= Primrose, Tarrant County, Texas =

Primrose, Texas
- Unincorporated community
- Location within Texas Location within the United States
- Coordinates: 32°36′42″N 97°26′00″W
- Country: United States
- State: Texas
- County: Tarrant
- Elevation: 774 ft (236 m)
- Time zone: UTC-6 (Central (CST))
  - Summer (DST): UTC-5 (CDT)
- Area codes: 682 and 817
- GNIS feature ID: 1378909

Primrose is an unincorporated community in Tarrant County, Texas, United States.

== History ==
Primrose is located directly east of Benbrook Lake, ten miles south-west of Fort Worth and was originally a community of farmers and ranchers. In the 1870s the St. Louis and San Francisco Railway arrived and in 1990 Primrose appeared as a stop on the Atchison, Topeka and Santa Fe Railway.

The community remains semi-rural, located on the southern edge of the Dallas-Fort Worth metroplex.
