= Thomas Robertson (minister) =

Thomas Robertson FRSE (c.1745–15 November 1799) was an 18th-century Scottish minister and historian who co-founded the Royal Society of Edinburgh in 1783.

== Life ==
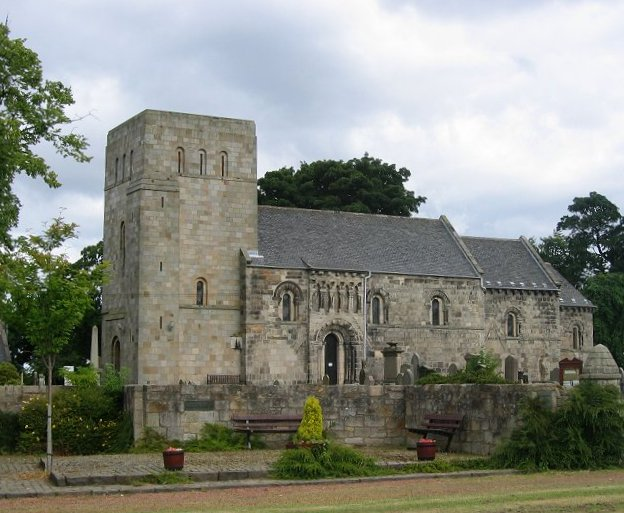
Dalmeny Kirk

He studied divinity at the University of Edinburgh and was licensed to preach by the Church of Scotland in 1775, marrying Jane Jackson in the same year. He was minister first in Lauder then in Dalmeny.

He died in Dalmeny on 15 November 1799.

== Publications ==
- The History of Mary Queen of Scots (1795)
