= Primrose Path =

Primrose Path or The Primrose Path may refer to:

== Drama ==
- Original quote from Hamlet I, iii, by William Shakespeare ("Himself the primrose path of dalliance treads")
- The Primrose Path (Buckner and Hart), a play by Robert Buckner and Walter Hart
- The Primrose Path (Veiller), a play by Bayard Veiller
- The Primrose Path (Whittell), a play by Crispin Whittell

== Film ==
- Primrose Path (1931 film), an American film directed by William A. O'Connor
- Primrose Path (1940 film), a 1940 film
- The Primrose Path (1915 film), an American silent film directed by Theodore Marston
- The Primrose Path (1925 film), an American silent film starring Clara Bow
- The Primrose Path (1934 film), a British film directed by Reginald Denham
- The Primrose Path, the original working title of the 1920 film Burnt Wings based on the Veiller play

== Literature ==
- "The Primrose Path" (D. H. Lawrence), a 1922 short story by D. H. Lawrence
- The Primrose Path (Matas novel), a 1995 novel by Carol Matas
- The Primrose Path (Stoker novel), an 1875 novel by Bram Stoker
- The Primrose Path (Thies novel), a 1987 novel by Joyce Thies

== Music ==
- Primrose Path (Dream State album), a 2019 album by Dream State
- Primrose Path (Jimmy Knepper and Bobby Wellins album), an album recorded in 1980 by Jimmy Knepper with Bobby Wellins
- The Primrose Path (Jonathan Bree album), 2013 album by Jonathan Bree

== See also ==
- Rumpole and the Primrose Path, radio play and short story by John Mortimer
