= Neil Primrose, 7th Earl of Rosebery =

Scottish nobleman (1929–2024)

Neil Archibald Primrose, 7th Earl of Rosebery, 3rd Earl of Midlothian, DL (11 February 1929 – 30 June 2024), styled Lord Primrose between 1931 and 1974, was a Scottish hereditary peer. He was a member of the House of Lords from 1974 to 1999.

== Early life and education ==
Rosebery was the only surviving son of Harry Primrose, 6th Earl of Rosebery and his second wife Hon Eva Bruce, daughter of Henry Bruce, 2nd Baron Aberdare. His paternal grandfather was Archibald Primrose, 5th Earl of Rosebery, the Liberal Prime Minister of the United Kingdom from 1894 to 1895. His paternal grandmother was the heiress Hannah, Countess of Rosebery (daughter of Mayer de Rothschild), who was regarded as the richest woman in England in the late 19th century.

After the death of his elder half-brother Ronald in 1931, he became heir apparent to his father and was styled Lord Primrose, as the courtesy title Lord Dalmeny was reserved out of respect for his late elder brother. During World War II he was educated at Sandroyd School before being evacuated to America, attending the Millbrook School in Millbrook, N.Y. (A slightly older student who attended at the same time, writer William F. Buckley Jr., would remark in a magazine article in 1981 that the young lord had been an uncontrollable "brat".) Afterward, he was educated at Stowe School and New College, Oxford.

== Marriage and children ==
Rosebery married Alison Mary Deirdre Reid (8 September 1931 - 24 May 2026) on 22 January 1955. He was appointed a Deputy Lieutenant (DL) of Midlothian in 1960 and succeeded his father as earl in 1974.

Rosebery resided at the family seat Dalmeny House near Edinburgh with his wife. They had five children together, four daughters and a son:

- Lady Lucy Catherine Mary Primrose (born 24 December 1955)
- Lady Jane Margaret Helen Primrose (born 11 July 1960)
- Lady Emma Elizabeth Anne Primrose (born 12 September 1962)
- Lady Caroline Sara Frances Primrose (born 20 November 1964)
- Harry Ronald Neil Primrose, 8th Earl of Rosebery (born 20 November 1967)

The Countess of Rosebery was a patroness of the Royal Caledonian Ball. Their son and youngest child, Harry, bore the courtesy title Lord Dalmeny until succeeding to the Rosebery earldoms, viscountcies and baronies.

== Death ==
Lord Rosebery died on 30 June 2024, at the age of 95. He was succeeded in the earldoms and other titles by his son Harry.

== Arms ==
Coat of arms of Neil Primrose, 7th Earl of Rosebery
Crest A demi-lion gules holding in the dexter paw a primrose or. Escutcheon Quarterly: 1st and 4th, vert, three primroses within a double tressure flory counterflory or (Primrose); 2nd and 3rd, Argent, a lion rampant, double queued sable (Cressy). Supporters Two lions or. Motto Fide et fiducia (By fidelity and confidence).

Peerage of Scotland
Preceded by Harry Primrose	Earl of Rosebery; 1974–2024	Succeeded by Harry Primrose
Peerage of the United Kingdom
Preceded by Harry Primrose	Earl of Midlothian; 1974–2024; Member of the House of Lords (1974–1999)	Succeeded by Harry Primrose
