= Archibald Primrose, Lord Carrington =

Scottish lawyer (1616–1679)

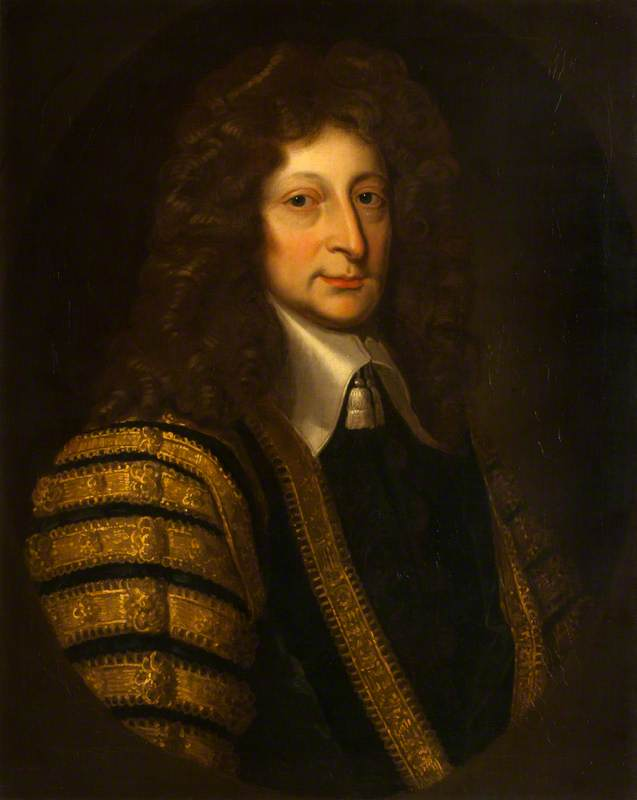
Portrait by John Scougal, 1676

Sir Archibald Primrose, 1st Baronet, Lord Carrington (16 May 1616 – 27 November 1679) was a Scottish lawyer, judge, and Cavalier.

== Early life ==
The eldest son of James Primrose (d. 1641), a writer and solicitor, by his second, or third, wife Catherine Lawson, a daughter of Richard Lawson of Boghall.

Primrose succeeded his father, who had held the office for upwards of forty years, as Clerk to the Privy Council on 2 September 1641.

== Career ==
Following the victory of Kilsyth he joined Montrose, was taken prisoner at Philiphaugh on 13 September 1645. He was tried by the Parliament of St. Andrews the following year, and being found guilty of treason only saved his life through the intercession of the Marquess of Argyll. Following his release at the end of 1646, he was knighted by King Charles I. Subsequently, he joined Charles II and was made a Baronet, of Carrington in the County of Selkirk, dated 1 August 1651, at Woodhouse, during the march to Worcester.

As a consequence of his loyalty to the Crown his estate was sequestrated and his debtors prohibited from paying what they owed to him. He was also deprived of his office by the Act of Classes, the decree against him being sealed on 10 March 1649. Upon the repeal of this Act, and having given testimony of the satisfaction afforded by him to The Church, he was declared capable again of office on 10 January 1651, and was appointed Clerk to the Committee of Estates on 6 June following.

At the Restoration he was appointed Lord Clerk Register by Letters Patent dated 7 August 1660, and on 14 February 1661 was nominated a Lord of Session with the judicial title Lord Carrington. At the same time he was appointed a Lord of Exchequer, and a Privy Counsellor. He was the principal author of the Rescissory Act 1661, which ended Presbyterianism until the Act of 1690 re-established it again.

The enmity of the Duke of Lauderdale forced him to resign as Lord of Exchequer and Lord Clerk Register on 11 June 1676, in exchange for the far less lucrative one of Lord Justice General. He was deprived of this office in 1678.

== Personal life ==
Primrose was twice married. His first marriage was to Elizabeth Keith, daughter of Sir James Keith of Benholme, and Margaret Lindsay. Before her death, they were the parents of:

- Catherine Primrose (d. c. 1677), who married Sir David Carnegie, 1st Baronet in 1663.
- Margaret Primrose (d. 1690), who married Sir John Foulis, 1st Baronet, in 1661.
- Sir James Primrose (1645–c. 1671), who married Elizabeth Sinclair, daughter of Sir Robert Sinclair, 1st Baronet.
- Maj.-Gen. Gilbert Primrose (1649–1731), a Colonel in the 24th Foot.
- Sir William Primrose, 2nd Baronet (1649–1687), who married Mary Scott, daughter of Patrick Scott.

After the death of his first wife, he married Agnes (née Gray) Dundas (d. 1699), the daughter of Sir William Gray of Pittendrum, and the widow of Sir James Dundas of Newliston. They were the parents of:

- Grizel Primrose (1661–1723), who married Francis Sempill, 8th Lord Sempill. After his death, she married Brig.-Gen. Richard Cunningham).
- Archibald Primrose, 1st Earl of Rosebery (1664–1723), who married Dorothea Cressy in c. 1690.

Primrose died in November 1679, and was buried within Dalmeny church. He and his father between them had served the Crown successively for a hundred years all but one. He was succeeded in the baronetcy by his eldest son William. Primrose's fourth son and namesake Archibald was created Earl of Rosebery in 1703.

=== Descendants ===
Through his third son William, he was a grandfather of James Primrose, 1st Viscount of Primrose (c. 1680–1706).

Through his fourth son Archibald, he was the ancestor of among others Prime Minister Archibald Primrose, 5th Earl of Rosebery.

Baronetage of Nova Scotia
| New creation | Baronet (of Carrington); 1651–1679 | Succeeded by William Primrose |
