= Earl of Rosebery =

Title in the Peerage of Scotland

Earldom of Rosebery held with Earldom of Midlothian
- Quarterly, first and fourth vert, three primroses within a double tressure flory-counter-flory Or (for Primrose); second and third argent, a lion rampant double queued sable (for Cressy).
- Creation date: 10 April 1703
- Created by: Queen Anne
- Peerage: Peerage of Scotland
- First holder: Archibald Primrose, 1st Earl of Rosebery
- Present holder: Harry Primrose, 8th Earl of Rosebery
- Heir apparent: Albert Primrose, Lord Dalmeny
- Remainder to: issue male and female successively
- Subsidiary titles: Earl of Midlothian; Viscount of Rosebery; Viscount of Inverkeithing; Viscount Mentmore; Lord Primrose and Dalmeny; Lord Dalmeny and Primrose; Baron Rosebery; Baron Epsom; Baronet
- Seat: Dalmeny House
- Former seat: Mentmore Towers

Earl of Rosebery is a title in the Peerage of Scotland created in 1703 for Archibald Primrose, 1st Viscount of Rosebery, with remainder to his issue male and female successively. Its name comes from Roseberry Topping, a hill near Archibald's wife's estates in Yorkshire. The current earl is Harry Primrose, 8th Earl of Rosebery.

== History ==
Archibald, the first Earl, was the fourth and youngest son of Sir Archibald Primrose, 1st Baronet, a Lord of Session under the title Lord Carrington, whose eldest son William was the father of James Primrose, who was created Viscount of Primrose in 1703. Archibald had already been created Lord Primrose and Dalmeny and Viscount of Rosebery in 1700, with remainder to his issue male and female successively, and in default thereof to the heirs of entail in the lands of Rosebery, and was made Lord Dalmeny and Viscount of Inverkeithing at the same time as he was given the earldom (and with similar remainders). These titles were also in the Peerage of Scotland.

He was succeeded by his son, James Primrose, the second Earl. In 1741, on the death of his cousin Hugh Primrose, 3rd Viscount Primrose, he succeeded as fifth Baronet, of Carrington (see the Viscount of Primrose, which title became extinct on the death of the third Viscount, for earlier history of the baronetcy). His son, Neil Primrose, the third Earl, sat in the House of Lords as a Scottish representative peer from 1768 to 1784. He was succeeded by his son, Archibald John Primrose, the fourth Earl. He represented Helston and Cashel in the House of Commons of the United Kingdom and served as Lord Lieutenant of Linlithgowshire. In 1828 he was created Baron Rosebery, of Rosebery in the County of Edinburgh, in the Peerage of the United Kingdom, which gave him and his descendants an automatic seat in the House of Lords.

His grandson, Archibald Philip Primrose, the fifth Earl (the son of Archibald Primrose, Lord Dalmeny), was a prominent Liberal politician. He served as Foreign Secretary in 1886 and between 1892 and 1894 and as Prime Minister of the United Kingdom between 1894 and 1895. In 1911 he was honoured when he was created Baron Epsom, of Hyde in the County of Surrey, Viscount Mentmore, of Mentmore in the County of Buckingham, and Earl of Midlothian, in the Peerage of the United Kingdom. Lord Rosebery was married to Hannah de Rothschild, the wealthy daughter and heiress of Baron Mayer Amschel de Rothschild.

Their eldest son, Albert Edward Harry Primrose, the sixth Earl, represented Midlothian in Parliament from 1906 to 1910 but then did not take an active part in politics until the 1940s, when he served in Winston Churchill's 1945 caretaker government as Secretary of State for Scotland. He was also Chairman of the National Liberal Party from 1945 to 1947. Since 2024 the titles are held by his grandson, the eighth Earl.

The heir apparent to the earldom is usually styled Lord Dalmeny, but the seventh Earl, while heir apparent to his father, the sixth Earl, was styled Lord Primrose instead, to avoid using the same courtesy title as his elder half-brother Ronald, who had been styled Lord Dalmeny before his death in 1931. On the seventh earl's accession, his son and heir returned to the usual practice and was styled Lord Dalmeny until himself succeeding to the title.

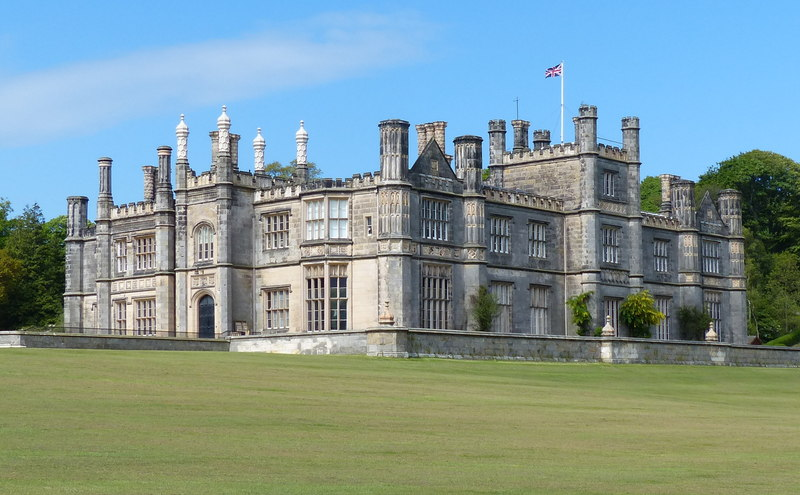
Dalmeny House in Scotland, the family seat of the earls of Rosebery

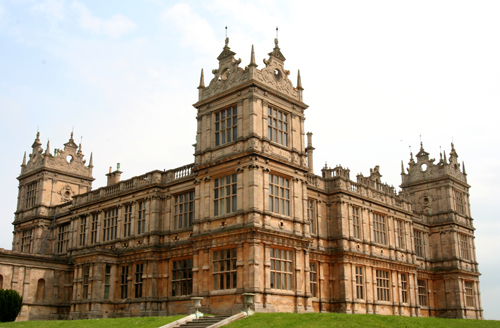
Mentmore Towers in England, built for the Rothschilds and inherited by the earls of Rosebery through Hannah de Rothschild

The family seat is Dalmeny House, near Dalmeny, City of Edinburgh, in Scotland, and until 1977 also resided at Mentmore Towers, near Mentmore, Buckinghamshire, in England.

== List of earls ==
- Archibald Primrose, 1st Earl of Rosebery (1664–1723)
- James Primrose, 2nd Earl of Rosebery (1691–1765)
- Neil Primrose, 3rd Earl of Rosebery (1729–1814)
- Archibald John Primrose, 4th Earl of Rosebery (1783–1868)
- Archibald Philip Primrose, 5th Earl of Rosebery, 1st Earl of Midlothian (1847–1929)
- (Albert Edward) Harry Meyer Archibald Primrose, 6th Earl of Rosebery, 2nd Earl of Midlothian (1882–1974)
- Neil Archibald Primrose, 7th Earl of Rosebery, 3rd Earl of Midlothian (1929–2024)
- Harry Ronald Neil Primrose, 8th Earl of Rosebery, 4th Earl of Midlothian (born 1967)

The heir apparent is the Earl's son, Albert Caspian Harry Primrose, Lord Dalmeny (born 2005).

== Horse racing ==
Jockey Colours for Lord Rosebery

The Earl has his own horse-racing colours: primrose with rose hoops and a rose cap. These were registered in 1868.

== Arms ==
Coat of arms of Earl of Rosebery
Crest A demi-lion gules holding in the dexter paw a primrose or. Escutcheon Quarterly: 1st and 4th, vert, three primroses within a double tressure flory counterflory or (Primrose); 2nd and 3rd, Argent, a lion rampant, double queued sable (Cressy). Supporters Two lions or. Motto Fide et fiducia (By fidelity and confidence).

== See also ==
- Viscount of Primrose
- Lady Sybil Grant
- Neil James Archibald Primrose
- Laird of Burnbrae
