= Dalmeny House =

Gothic revival mansion in Scotland

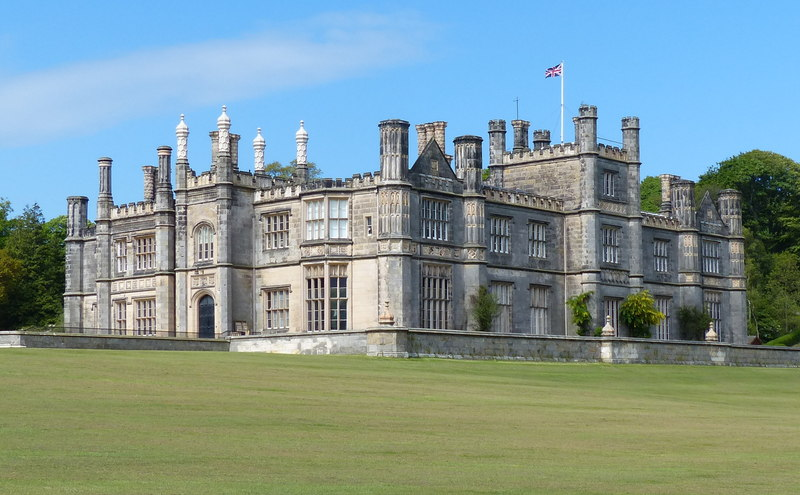
- Dalmeny House, south front

- Location of Dalmeny House in City of Edinburgh
- 55.988°N 3.3343°W
- Location: Dalmeny, Edinburgh, Scotland, United Kingdom
- OS grid reference: NT168780

History
- Built: 1817
- Built for: Archibald Primrose, 4th Earl of Rosebery

Site notes
- Architect: William Wilkins
- Architectural style: Tudor Gothic Revival

Listed Building – Category A
- Designated: 22 February 1971
- Reference no.: LB82

Inventory of Gardens and Designed Landscapes in Scotland
- Official name: Dalmeny
- Criteria: Work of Art; Historical; Architectural; Scenic; Nature Conservation
- Designated: 30 June 1987
- Reference no.: GDL00130

Dalmeny House (pronounced /dælˈmɛni/ dal-MEN-ee) is a Gothic revival mansion located in an estate close to Dalmeny on the Firth of Forth, in the north-west of Edinburgh, Scotland. It was designed by William Wilkins, and completed in 1817. Dalmeny House is the home of the Earl and Countess of Rosebery. The house was the first in Scotland to be built in the Tudor Revival style. It provided more comfortable accommodation than the former ancestral residence, Barnbougle Castle, which still stands close by. Dalmeny today remains a private house, although it is open to the public during the summer months. The house is protected as a category A listed building, while the grounds are included in the Inventory of Gardens and Designed Landscapes in Scotland.

== History ==
In the 13th century, the estate was the property of the Mowbray family, who built Barnbougle Castle. In 1402 Sir John Mowbray of Barnbougle, Laird of Dalmeny, was knighted by Sir Thomas Erskine at the battle of Homildon Hill.

The estate was acquired in 1662 by Sir Archibald Primrose, whose son was created Earl of Rosebery in 1703. In 1774 Neil Primrose, 3rd Earl of Rosebery, commissioned Robert Adam to design a new house at Barnbougle, and in 1788 Robert Burn also provided designs. However, the Earl concentrated on the estate, carrying out woodland planting and constructing a walled garden. The son of the 3rd Earl, Archibald Primrose, commissioned further plans in the early 19th century: from William Atkinson (1805) and William Burn (1808). Again nothing was done until Archibald succeeded as 4th Earl of Rosebery in 1814. He then turned for a new house to Jeffrey Wyatt, who provided a Tudor Gothic design. Lord Rosebery approved, but wished to employ William Wilkins, with whom he had attended Cambridge. Wilkins was therefore asked for a Tudor Gothic design, which was eventually built in 1817. The design of the house draws on the 16th-century East Barsham Manor in Norfolk. From 1812 the designed landscape around the house was also laid out, to designs by Thomas White Jr.

The house was visited in 1927 by Queen Mary, and her daughter Mary, the Princess Royal.

== Interiors ==
In contrast to the exterior, most of the principal rooms are in the Regency style, with the exception of the hammerbeam roof of the hall. The house contains many paintings and items of furniture from both the Rosebery and Rothschild collections, as a result of the 5th Earl's 1878 marriage to Hannah, daughter and heir of Meyer de Rothschild. Much of the French furniture and porcelain came from the family's English mansion, Mentmore, Buckinghamshire, following the latter's sale in 1977. Dalmeny also holds one of Britain's largest collections of Napoleonic memorabilia.

== Estate ==
The house stands in a large wooded park and enjoys views across the Firth of Forth. A public path runs along the shore, from Queensferry in the west, to Cramond in the east, although a passenger ferry across the River Almond that used to connect the path to the village of Cramond has not operated since 2000. There is still a traditional agricultural estate of tenanted farms.

== Public opening ==
The house is open to the public for guided tours only. Some of the rooms are available to hire for corporate and private events.

== Filming ==
The house was used as a filming location for the fictional castle of 'Dun Dunbar' in the 2021 film A Castle for Christmas.
