= Ronald Primrose, Lord Dalmeny =

English-born Scottish cricketer

(Archibald) Ronald Primrose, Lord Dalmeny (1 August 1910 – 11 November 1931), was an English-born Scottish cricketer.

== Early life and career ==
Always known by his second forename, Ronald, Primrose was born in London and was styled Lord Dalmeny as the heir apparent of his father Harry Primrose, 6th Earl of Rosebery. Educated at Eton and New College, Oxford, Primrose played in the Eton v Harrow cricket match at Lord's in 1928.

Like his father, he represented Middlesex and he also played a single match for Oxford University. He played in three first-class matches between 1929 and 1931, as a right-handed batsman and as a right-arm fast-medium bowler. He died in Oxford from blood poisoning in 1931 at the age of 21, predeceasing his father.
