= Laird of Burnbrae =

Hereditary title in Scotland

Laird of Burnbrae was a hereditary title in Scotland that was held by several generations in the Primrose family. The Lands of Burnbrae was situated near Kincardine, and has since been joined with Kincardine.

The book, Culross and Tulliallan, states that the Lands of Burnbrae were previously held by the Blaw family until it was passed on to the Primrose family when Margaret Blaw married Archibald Primrose, who then became the first proprietor of that name to hold the lands of Burnbrae. The Primrose family held the title to the Lands of Burnbrae for over two hundred years until it became incorporated with the Tulliallan estate.

The Lairds of Burnbrae resided in Tulliallan, formerly in Perthshire, Scotland although in some early sources Tulliallan is cited as part of Fife, where it currently lies. The family is related to the Lord Dalmeny (a subordinate title of the Earl of Rosebery), whose family surname is also Primrose.

== Lairds of Burnbrae ==
Archibald Primrose was the first Laird of Burnbrae. He was born about 1538 in Culross to Duncan Primrose and Helen Smyth. Archibald married Margaret Blaw about 1564 in Culross.

Peter Primrose is the second known Laird of Burnbrae and uncle of the first Laird. He was born about 1512 and died in July 1584.

Henry Primrose is the third known Laird of Burnbrae. He was born in 1536 to Peter Primrose. Henry married Margaret Beveridge in about 1558 and died in 1576.

Peter Primrose is the fourth known Laird of Burnbrae. He was born in 1560 to Henry Primrose and Margaret Beverage. Peter married Margaret Callender and died in 1609.

John Primrose is the fifth known Laird of Burnbrae. He was born about 1590 to Peter Primrose and Margaret Callender. It is unknown who the mother(s) of his children are but it is recorded that he married Elizabeth Sands on 20 September 1665 in Culross, Fife, Scotland. John died in December 1669.

John Primrose is the sixth known Laird of Burnbrae. He was born about 1617 to John Primrose, and married Margaret Reiddock.

John Primrose is the seventh known Laird of Burnbrae. He was christened on 26 December 1648 in Culross, Fife, Scotland to John Primrose and Margaret Reiddock. John married Christian Wannan on 24 October 1680.

William Primrose is the eighth known Laird of Burnbrae. He was born on 16 May 1685 to John Primrose and Christian Wannan. William married Janet Drysdale on 6 April 1716. Janet was born on 3 February 1689 to John Drysdale and Margaret Love.

John Primrose is the ninth known Laird of Burnbrae. He was christened on 3 May 1719 to William Primrose and Janet Drysdale. John married Janet Primrose about 1745.

James Primrose is the tenth and last known Laird of Burnbrae. He was born about 1746 to John Primrose and Janet Primrose. He was also known by the title "esquire". James married Jane Lawrie about 1784 and died November 1827; his wife died in April 1832.
