= Bamber Gascoigne =

English television presenter (1935–2022)

Bamber Gascoigne CBE FRSL
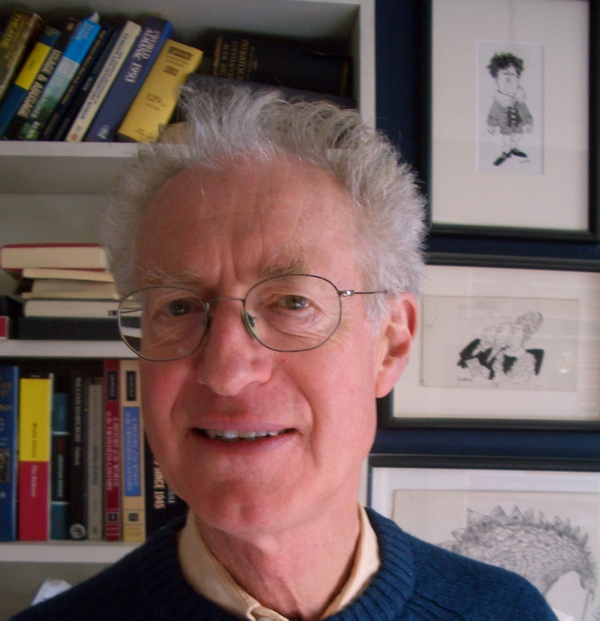
- Gascoigne in 2006, photographed by his wife
- Born: Arthur Bamber Gascoigne; 24 January 1935; Richmond, Surrey, England
- Died: 8 February 2022 (aged 87); Richmond, London, England
- Education: Sunningdale School; Eton College; Magdalene College, Cambridge; Yale University
- Occupations: Television presenter, historian, author
- Years active: 1962–2022
- Known for: Original quizmaster of University Challenge
- Spouse: Christina Ditchburn (m. 1965)
- Website: HistoryWorld; Timesearch

Arthur Bamber Gascoigne (/ˈɡæskɔɪn/ GASK-oyn; 24 January 1935 – 8 February 2022) was an English television presenter and author. He was the original quizmaster of University Challenge, which initially ran from 1962 to 1987.

== Early life and education ==
Gascoigne was born in Richmond, Surrey (now in London), on 24 January 1935. He was the elder son of Lieutenant-Colonel Derek Ernest Frederick Orby Gascoigne by his marriage in 1934 to Mary ("Midi") Louisa Hermione O'Neill.

Gascoigne was educated at Sunningdale School in Berkshire before winning a scholarship to Eton College. With National Service still compulsory, after leaving Eton Gascoigne trained at the Mons Officer Cadet School and on 27 March 1953 was commissioned as a Second Lieutenant into the Grenadier Guards. He had six months of duty at Buckingham Palace before being posted to Germany.

In 1955, he took up a scholarship at Magdalene College, Cambridge, and read English literature. He initially wanted to become an actor, but found it tiresome to play the same part for more than a week, so instead turned to writing. Whilst at Magdalene he initially submitted scripts to the Footlights sketch troupe, though these were never performed. However, in his second year he wrote a college revue that was seen by the producer Michael Codron. Codron liked it enough to stage it in the West End in 1957, as a musical titled Share My Lettuce. It was performed by Maggie Smith and Kenneth Williams (with music by Keith Statham and Patrick Gowers).

Gascoigne then spent a year as a Commonwealth Fund scholar at Yale University (1958–59).

On his return to England, he became a theatre critic, firstly for The Spectator and later for The Observer. His play Big in Brazil was staged at the Old Vic, London, in November 1984. Although not well received by critics, the run continued until 1985.

Gascoigne met his future wife, Christina Ditchburn, at Cambridge, and they married in 1965.

== Ancestry ==
Gascoigne's family were originally Norman, arriving in England in the early 13th century. Gascoigne's mother was a daughter of Captain the Hon. Arthur O'Neill and Lady Annabel Hungerford Crewe-Milnes.

His father was the son of Brigadier-General Sir Ernest Frederick Orby Gascoigne and Laura Cicely, daughter of General Edward Henry Clive, of that family of Styche Hall, Shropshire, from which also came the soldier and colonial administrator in India, Robert Clive ('Clive of India').

Gascoigne's great-grandfathers included the 1st Marquess of Crewe and the 2nd Baron O'Neill. He was a nephew of Sir Julian Gascoigne, who was in charge of the Household Division during the coronation of Queen Elizabeth II, and of Terence O'Neill, Prime Minister of Northern Ireland (1963–1969).

Gascoigne was a direct descendant of Sir Crisp Gascoyne, an 18th-century Lord Mayor of London, and the Tory politicians Bamber Gascoyne (the elder) and Isaac Gascoyne. Isaac's son, General Ernest Frederick Gascoyne, of Raby Hall, Liverpool (1796–1867), was his great-great-great-grandfather. The name Bamber was the surname of the Lord Mayor's wife, and was given to their son.

== University Challenge ==
Gascoigne was the original presenter (from 1962) of the television quiz show University Challenge, based on the US series College Bowl. He held the position for 25 years, until the end of the initial run in 1987. As well as presenting the show, he also set all the questions in its first series. His manner of questioning was regarded as firm yet polite. Phrases he often used which became catchphrases include: "Fingers on buzzers", "your starter for ten", "no conferring", and "I'll have to hurry you." The show was at first planned to last for only 13 episodes, but was such a hit that Gascoigne eventually presented 913 episodes. Some contestants later became notable in their careers, including David Lidington (whose team won) and Miriam Margolyes. When the show was revived in 1994, Gascoigne declined to apply to present it again, for he was involved with other projects; Jeremy Paxman took on the role.

In 1984 University Challenge was lampooned in the "Bambi" episode of the alternative comedy series The Young Ones, in which Griff Rhys Jones parodied Gascoigne. In 1998 on BBC Two's Red Dwarf Night, Gascoigne presented a parody titled Universe Challenge, based on the sci-fi comedy series Red Dwarf.

Gascoigne is portrayed by actor Mark Gatiss in the 2006 comedy-drama film Starter for 10 and by Robert Portal in the 2024 stage musical adaptation.

== Television and books ==
Gascoigne was the author of Murgatreud's Empire, a 1972 satirical novel concerning an entrepreneur who finds an island of pygmies and trades them arms for treasure, recreating the development of European medieval weaponry and armour. This was originally written as a script, although the play was abandoned because of the impossibility of finding suitable performers for a cast of forty pygmies.

In 1977, Gascoigne wrote and presented The Christians, a 13-hour television documentary series on the history of Christianity, produced by Granada Television and broadcast on ITV. In the same year he wrote a companion book, under the same title, with photography by his wife, Christina Gascoigne, which was published by Jonathan Cape. In 2003 it was revised and republished as A Brief History of Christianity by Robinson Publishing.

Gascoigne wrote Quest for the Golden Hare, a 1983 account of the internationally publicised treasure hunt associated with the publication in 1979 of Kit Williams' book Masquerade. On 8 August 1979, Gascoigne was witness to the burial by Williams, in an earthenware jar "somewhere in Britain", of a unique jewelled, solid gold pendant in the design of a hare. The book documents the search and a scandal associated with the pendant's eventual discovery.

In 1987, Gascoigne presented a documentary series of six 30-minute programmes on Victorian history, Victorian Values, produced by Granada Television. The programmes looked at how Victorian society put in place the infrastructure of the modern welfare state.

In 1988, Gascoigne devised and presented a BBC Two arts quiz called Connoisseur, for which he also set the questions.

Gascoigne was the writer and presenter of the TV series The Great Moghuls (1990), a study of the Mughal Empire of India. The series was based on Gascoigne's 1971 book of the same name, which features photographs by his wife.

In 1994, Gascoigne held the Sandars Readership in Bibliography at Cambridge University and presented "From priceless perfection to cheap charm: stages in the development of colour printing".

== Other activities ==
Gascoigne established an online history encyclopaedia, HistoryWorld, based on British history. He had already published a hard copy of this encyclopaedia, but he saw the internet as an opportunity to reach millions more people than would see the book. He also established TimeSearch, which presents multiple searchable timelines collected from various websites.

Gascoigne was a lifelong supporter of the Liberal Party and subsequently the Liberal Democrats. He publicly endorsed the latter during their 2019 general election campaign. In August 2014, Gascoigne was one of 200 public figures who were signatories to a letter to The Guardian opposing Scottish independence in the run-up to September's referendum on that issue.

On the death of his great-aunt Mary Innes-Ker, Duchess of Roxburghe, in 2014, Gascoigne inherited an estate at West Horsley, Surrey, including West Horsley Place, a large country house dating from the 16th century. Gascoigne sold some of the late Duchess's possessions and used the proceeds to restore the house. This was followed by the building of an opera house in its grounds, the Theatre in the Woods, which serves as the home base of the Grange Park Opera. An original pencil-and-chalk study for the painting Flaming June by Sir Frederic Leighton was found on the back of a bedroom door in the house. Art historians knew a sketch had existed, for it was published in an art magazine in 1895, but did not know who had owned it; it was probably bought by the Duchess's paternal grandfather after Leighton's death. From 2018 until 2023, West Horsley Place was used as the filming location for the fictional Button House in the BBC TV comedy series Ghosts.

== External interests ==
Gascoigne was elected in 1976 as a Fellow of the Royal Society of Literature. He was a trustee of the National Gallery, a trustee of the Tate Gallery, a member of the council of the National Trust, and a member of the board of directors of the Royal Opera House, Covent Garden. He was also a patron of the Museum of Richmond.

== Personal life, honours and death ==
Gascoigne was married, for 57 years until his death, to Christina (née Ditchburn), daughter of civil servant Alfred Henry Ditchburn. He met her at Cambridge, they married in 1965 and lived in Richmond, London from the late 1960s onward. A full time artist, she worked in ceramics, silks and other media. The couple did not have any children. She died on 14 August 2026.

With regard to religion, he described himself as "a perfectly friendly agnostic". Gascoigne was appointed Commander of the Order of the British Empire (CBE) in the 2018 Birthday Honours for services to the Arts.

In January 2022, Gascoigne was hospitalised for three weeks with pneumonia. Following his hospitalisation, his health drastically declined. He died at his home in Richmond on 8 February 2022, at the age of 87. Stephen Fry, another famous University Challenge alumnus, led the tributes to Gascoigne, saying he was "such an elegant, intelligent man". Victoria Coren Mitchell, host of BBC quiz show Only Connect, said: "No quiz host has ever seemed more like they could answer all the questions themselves."

== Selected publications ==
- 1962: Twentieth Century Drama, London: Hutchinson University Library ISBN 978-0-0906-5843-5
- 1968: Leda Had a Little Swan OCLC 44110879 (play, cancelled on the day before opening, in New York, after fourteen previews)
- 1968: World Theatre: An Illustrated History, Ebury Press ISBN 978-0316305006
- 1971: The Great Moghuls (with photographs by Christina Gascoigne), London: Jonathan Cape; New York: Harper & Row
- 1973: The Treasures and Dynasties of China (with photographs by Christina Gascoigne and Derrick Witty), Jonathan Cape. ISBN 0-224-00925-7 Republished 2003 as A Brief History of the Dynasties of China ISBN 1-84119-791-2
- 1973: The Heyday, Jonathan Cape ISBN 978-0224009058 (novel)
- 1974: Ticker Khan: A Fable, Jonathan Cape ISBN 978-022-401061-0
- 1975: Castles of Great Britain (introduction; with Christina Gascoigne), Thames & Hudson ISBN 0-500-24098-1
- 1977: The Christians (with photographs by Christina Gascoigne), London: Jonathan Cape; New York: William Morrow & Co. ISBN 0-688-03220-6 Revised and republished 2003 as A Brief History of Christianity, Robinson Publishing ISBN 1-84119-710-6
- 1981: Why the Rope Went Tight (children's stories, with pictures by Christina Gascoigne), London: Methuen; New York: Lothrop, Lee & Shepard Books ISBN 978-0688005900
- 1982: Fearless Freddy's Sunken Treasure (children's stories, with pictures by Christina Gascoigne), London: Methuen ISBN 0-416-06510-4
- 1982: Fearless Freddy's Magic Wish (children's stories, with pictures by Christina Gascoigne), London: Methuen ISBN 978-0-416-06520-6
- 1983: Quest for the Golden Hare, Jonathan Cape ISBN 0-224-02116-8
- 1986: Cod Streuth, Jonathan Cape ISBN 0-224-02388-8
- 1986: How to Identify Prints: A Complete Guide to Manual and Mechanical Processes from Woodcut to Inkjet, Thames & Hudson; revised 2nd edition 2004 ISBN 0-500-28480-6
- 1988: (with J Wright): Bamber Gascoigne's Book of Amazing Facts, London: Walker Books ISBN 0-7445-1082-1; ISBN 978-0-7445-1082-9
- 1993: Encyclopaedia of Britain: The A–Z of Britain's Past and Present, Macmillan Publishers ISBN 0-333-54764-0
- 1997: Milestones in Colour Printing 1457–1859: With a Bibliography of Nelson Prints (The Sandars Lectures in Bibliography), Cambridge University Press ISBN 978-0-521-55441-1
- 1998: A Brief History of the Great Moghuls: India's Most Flamboyant Rulers [revised edition of The Great Moghuls (1971)], Philadelphia, PA: Running Press ISBN 0-7867-1040-3
- 2007: Bamber Gascoigne's Challenging Quiz Book, London: Penguin Books ISBN 978-0-14-103470-6
- 2010: A Brief History of the Second World War, HistoryWorld ISBN 1-908143-00-2
- 2011: A Brief History of the First World War, HistoryWorld ISBN 1-908143-03-7, ISBN 1-908143-03-7
- 2011: The Maya, Aztecs, Incas and Conquistadors: A Brief History, HistoryWorld ISBN 978-1-908143-06-8
- 2014: The Dynasties of China: A History, The Folio Society ISBN 0-786712-19-8
