= West Horsley =

Village and parish in Surrey, England

Coordinates: 51°15′40″N 0°27′14″W

- Village
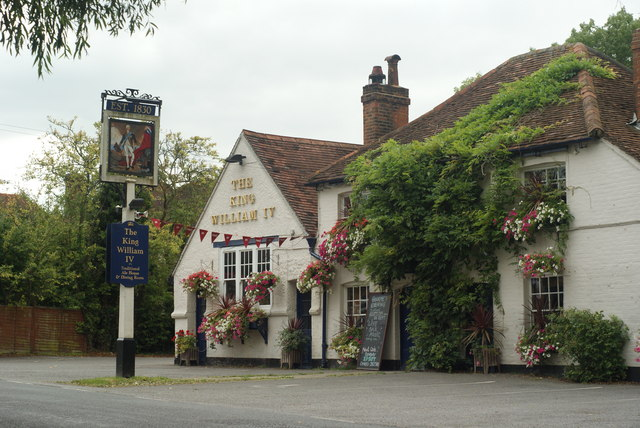
- The King William IV is one of two pubs of the village

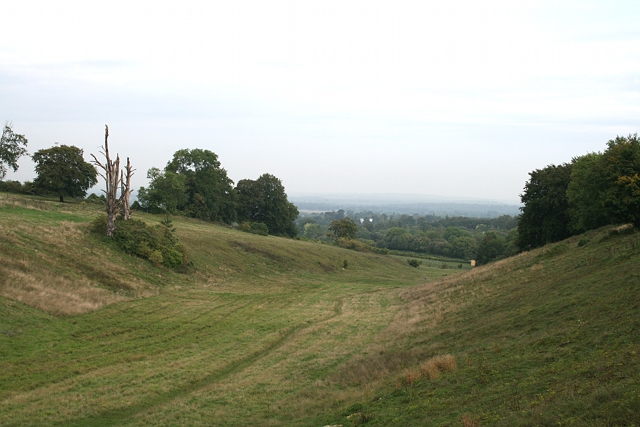
- Daws Dene refers to part of the Sheepleas and adjoining public woodlands of the North Downs

- Location within Surrey
- Area: 10.83 km^{2} (4.18 sq mi)
- Population: 2,828 (Civil Parish 2011)
  - Density: 261/km^{2} (680/sq mi)
- OS grid reference: TQ0752
- Civil parish: West Horsley
- District: Guildford
- Shire county: Surrey
- Region: South East
- Country: England
- Sovereign state: United Kingdom
- Post town: Leatherhead
- Postcode district: KT24
- Dialling code: 01483
- Police: Surrey
- Fire: Surrey
- Ambulance: South East Coast
- UK Parliament: Guildford

West Horsley is a semi-rural village between Guildford and Leatherhead in Surrey, England. It lies on the A246, and south of the M25 and the A3. Its civil parish ascends to an ancient woodland Sheepleas Woods which are on the northern downslopes of the ridge of hills known as the North Downs in the extreme south of the village, and cover about a tenth of its area, 255 acres (1 km^{2}). The bulk of its land is north of the Surrey Hills AONB; the rest is within it.

== History ==
West Horsley appears in the Domesday Book of 1086 as Orselei held by Walter, son of Othere. Its Domesday assets were: 8 hides; 1 church, 8 ploughs, woodland worth 20 hogs. It rendered £6 each year to its lords of the manor. Both Horsleys were burnt to the ground during the Norman Conquest of 1066 since its Saxon thane, Brixsi, was brother-in-law to King Harold and refused to submit. The village was part of the lands given to the Norman, Walter Fitz Otha, the new constable of Windsor Castle.

The population fell dramatically during the Black Death and the land was given over to grazing, since the peasant population was insufficient for farming.

In 1636, during a court case concerning a tithe dispute, a witness called Henry Mabbinck testified that he played cricket "in the Parke" at West Horsley, one of the sport's earliest references.

Helen Allingham painted an image of the village, "Children on a Path Outside A Thatched Cottage, West Horsley, Surrey".

Maartje Tamboezer, the second murder victim of John Duffy and David Mulcahy (branded the 'Railway Killers'), was killed in West Horsley in 1986, although Horsley railway station itself is in East Horsley.

The bulk of West Horsley parish is north of the Surrey Hills AONB, the rest is within it.

== Amenities ==
=== Church ===
St Mary's Church, is a flint Saxon building dating from 1030 and is Grade I listed. The church was spared when the rest of the village was burned in 1066. Its tower was added in 1120, and the church extended to its current size in 1210.

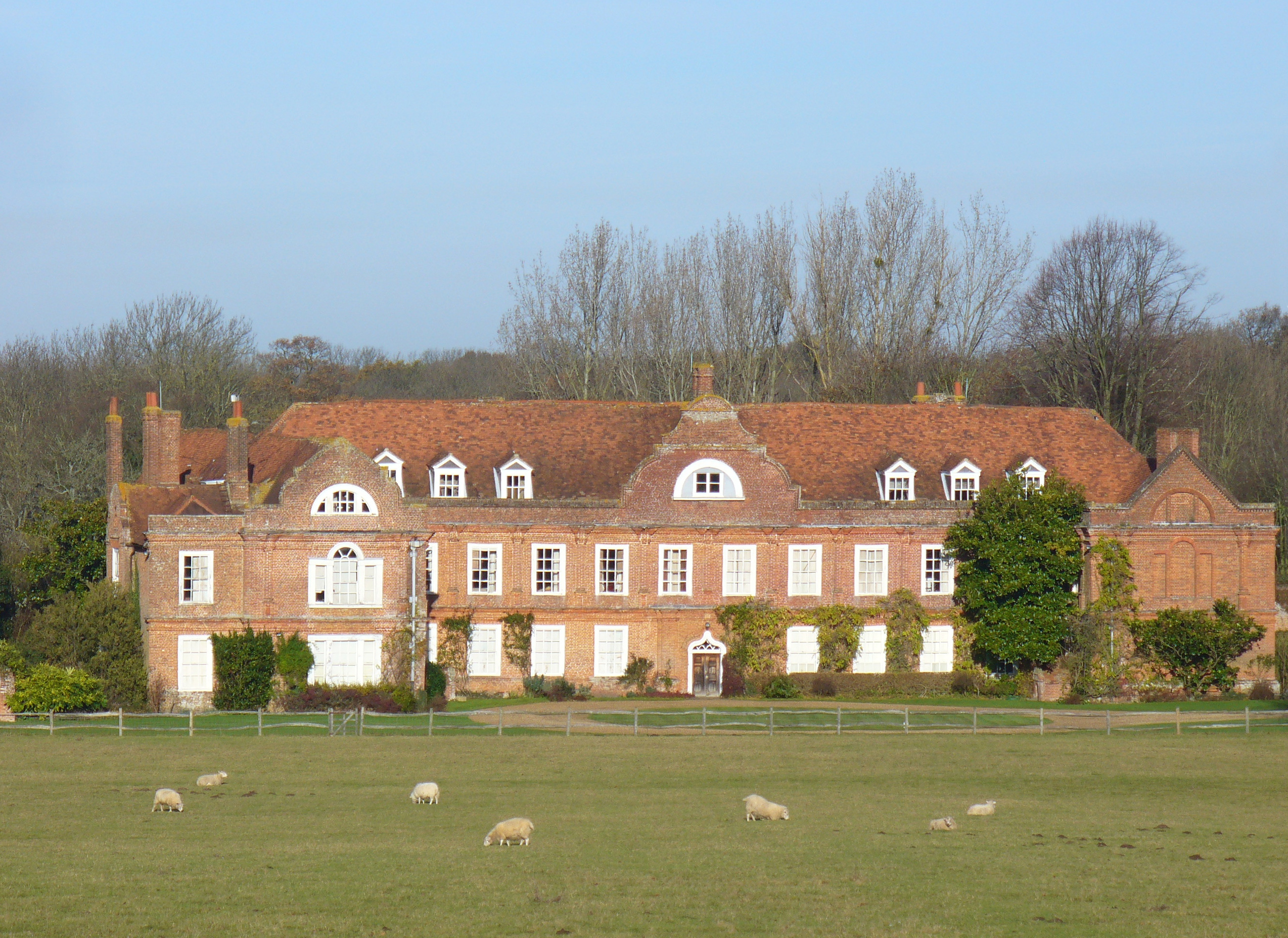
West Horsley Place, a Grade I listed building with origins in the medieval period.

=== West Horsley Place ===
West Horsley Place is a medieval house that was substantially reconstructed between the 16th and 18th centuries. It shares in top-ranked listing status for architecture. Acquired in 1931 by the Marquis and Marchioness of Crewe, after the death of the Marquis in 1947 it was left by his wife (Peggy née Primrose d. 1967) to their daughter, Mary Innes-Ker, Duchess of Roxburghe (23 March 1915 – 2 July 2014). On her death in 2014 aged 99, it passed to her great-nephew Bamber Gascoigne, the grandson of her much older half-sister Lady Annabel Hungerford Crewe-Milnes.

=== Sheepleas open space ===
The Sheepleas Woods are a beech woodland and grassland on the northern downslopes of the ridge of hills known as the North Downs in the extreme south of the village, and stretch to 103 hectares (255 acres) (1.03 km^{2}) within the Area of Outstanding Natural Beauty.

=== Upper Common ===
This similar sized and shaped area of woodland is slightly higher than Sheepleas open space.

=== The Raleigh School ===
The Raleigh School is a two-form entry co-educational primary academy. It takes children from 4 to 11, and also has a privately run nursery on site that admits children from the age of 2 1/2.

== Transport ==
The village is served by Horsley railway station, in the nearby village of East Horsley.

It lies on the A246, and south of the M25 and the A3.

== Demography and housing ==
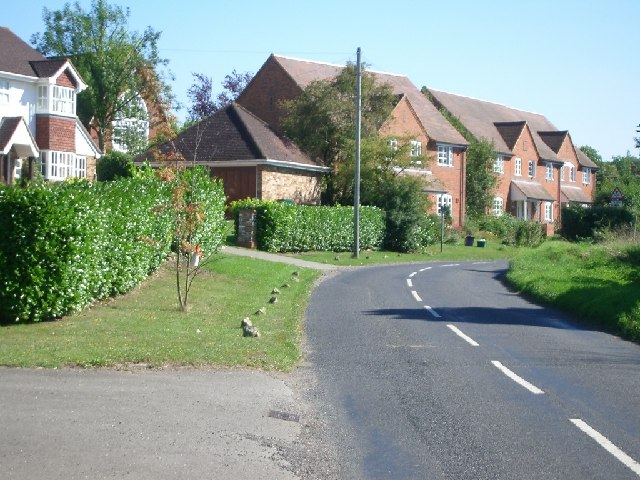
West Horsley has few apartments in favour of larger housing without communal areas within them

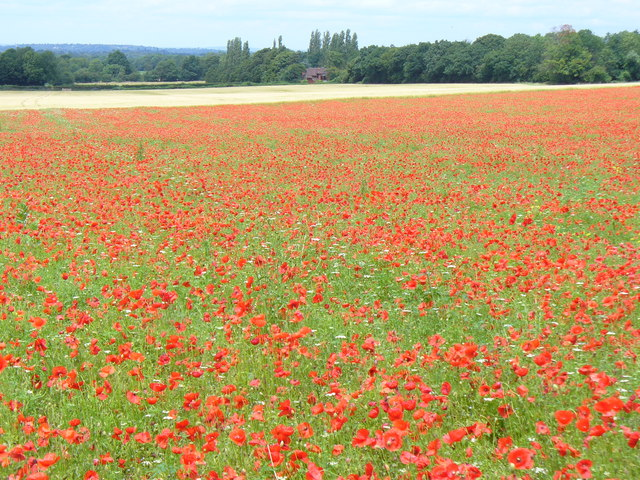
The Sheepleas features this poppy field

2011 Census homes
Output area	Detached	Semi-detached	Terraced	Flats and apartments	Caravans/temporary/mobile homes	shared between households
(Civil Parish)	701	337	25	46	2	0

The average level of accommodation in the region composed of detached houses was 28%, the average that was apartments was 22.6%.

2011 Census key statistics
Output area	Population	Households	% Owned outright	% Owned with a loan	hectares
(Civil Parish)	2,828	1,111	48.7%	37.1%	1083

The proportion of households in the civil parish who owned their home outright compares to the regional average of 35.1%. The proportion who owned their home with a loan compares to the regional average of 32.5%. The remaining % is made up of rented dwellings (plus a negligible % of households living rent-free).

== Notable people ==
- Tom Felton, actor
- Bamber Gascoigne, host of University Challenge. He inherited West Horsley Place from his great-aunt Mary Innes-Ker, Duchess of Roxburghe in 2014.
- David Mallet, music video and film director
- David Ogilvy, "The Father of advertising"
- George Waller, recipient of the Victoria Cross
