= Jock Colville =

British civil servant and diarist (1915-1987)

Sir John Colville CB CVO
- Born: John Rupert Colville; 28 January 1915
- Died: 19 November 1987 (aged 72)
- Occupations: Civil servant, diarist
- Spouse: Lady Margaret Egerton (m. 1948)
- Children: 3
- Parent: Lady Cynthia Crewe-Milnes

Sir John Rupert "Jock" Colville (28 January 1915 – 19 November 1987) was a British civil servant. He is best known for his diaries, which provide an intimate view of number 10 Downing Street during the wartime Premiership of Winston Churchill.

== Family background ==
Colville came from a politically active and well-connected family, although, as he stated in the introduction to his published diaries, he was the younger son of a younger son and so did not inherit family wealth.

His father was the Hon. George Charles Colville, who was secretary of the Institute of Chartered Accountants and the younger son of Charles Colville, 1st Viscount Colville of Culross, a Conservative politician who served as Master of the Buckhounds and Tory Chief Whip.

His mother was Lady Cynthia, a courtier and social worker. She was the daughter of Robert Crewe-Milnes, 1st Marquess of Crewe, by his first wife, the former Sibyl Graham, daughter of the Graham Baronets of Netherby. Colville never knew his maternal grandmother, who died young; his maternal grandfather, a Liberal Cabinet minister, remarried Margaret (Peggy) Primrose, daughter of Lord Rosebery, Liberal Prime Minister in 1894–1895, and his wife Hannah, heiress to her father’s Rothschild fortune. Lionel Nathan de Rothschild was a close friend. Lady Cynthia, in addition to her duties as a Woman of the Bedchamber to Queen Mary, devoted her energies to alleviating the suffering of Shoreditch, one of the poorest areas of the East End of London.

Colville had two elder brothers, David Richard (11 May 1909 – 9 February 1987) and Major Philip Robert Colville (7 November 1910 – 11 April 1997). Colville's first cousin and schoolmate was Terence O'Neill, later Prime Minister of Northern Ireland from 1964 to 1969, and another cousin was Terence's younger half-brother, the writer Quentin Crewe. Other relatives include O'Neill's successor James Chichester-Clark and Colville's aunt Mary Innes-Ker, Duchess of Roxburghe. Peter Carington, 6th Baron Carrington, a Conservative politician who served as Foreign Secretary in the cabinet of Margaret Thatcher from 1979 to 1982, was his second cousin. (Note: Jock Colville, Lord Carrington and Harry Legge-Bourke were all great-grandsons of Robert Carrington, 2nd Baron Carrington.)

== Early life and education ==
Colville served alongside Harry Legge-Bourke (his half–second cousin) as a Page of Honour between 1927 and 1931, thanks to his mother's connections as attendant to the queen. She also ensured he saw the other side of life, by taking him to the infant welfare centre she ran in Shoreditch in London. He was educated at West Downs School, Winchester; Harrow; and Trinity College, Cambridge.

In preparation for a career in the diplomatic service, he twice spent a few months in the Black Forest to improve his German. The first time in the village of Marxzell was just before university in 1933, and the second was just after in 1937. He thus saw the very beginning of Hitler's chancellorship, and its effects once it had bedded in: "There was increasing Strength matched by diminishing Joy" (This was an ironic reference to the Nazi morale-building programme of Kraft durch Freude, "Strength through Joy").

== Public life ==
Colville was Assistant Private Secretary to three Prime Ministers:

- Neville Chamberlain, 1939–1940,
- Winston Churchill, 1940–1941 and 1943–1945 (and Joint Principal Private Secretary, 1951–1955),
- Clement Attlee, 1945.

=== Diaries ===
Colville kept a diary from 1939 to 1957, parts of which have been published (The Fringes of Power: 10 Downing Street Diaries 1939–1955). The original diaries are held at the Churchill Archives Centre, Cambridge University, and, with the exception of the final volume, are open to the public.

Churchill was, as appears from the diaries, fond of Colville, and, from reading the published diaries, it is apparent that Colville was close to the rest of the Churchill family. When Churchill was ill with pneumonia, it was Colville who was summoned from his brief stint of active service in the RAF to accompany Clementine Churchill on an aeroplane to Egypt to visit him, although it was clear on their arrival that Churchill's life was not in danger. Typical of the badinage between Churchill and his private secretary was the exchange when, immediately before Colville's departure for RAF service in 1941, Churchill asked him his age. On being told, Churchill pointed out that, at 26, Napoleon was commanding the armies of Italy. Colville replied that the Younger Pitt was Prime Minister at the age of 24.

The diaries record many conversations between Churchill and his political and military colleagues, as well as his private thoughts. They illustrate the contrast between the "atmosphere of rush" about Churchill, as compared with the shorter hours and reduced energy levels associated with his older predecessor Neville Chamberlain, whom Colville had also served. Comments in the diaries show how, even when beset by disasters in the early days of his premiership, Churchill was still able to raise the spirits of those around him, with his sense of purpose and his sense of humour. They reveal that much of Churchill's correspondence (although none of his speeches) was drafted by Colville and others in their imitations of Churchill's distinctive style, albeit subject to his approval. The diaries also cover Churchill's peacetime premiership and his regularly deferred retirement, and note that, when Churchill did finally retire, Colville found him sitting on his bed at 10 Downing Street saying (of his successor, Anthony Eden) "I don't think Anthony can do it!".

=== Career as pilot ===
Colville served in World War II as a pilot in the Royal Air Force Volunteer Reserve (RAFVR), 1941–1944.

== Later public career ==
He served as Private Secretary to the then Princess Elizabeth 1947–1949 and was Joint Principal Private Secretary to the prime minister, Winston Churchill, 1951–1955.

He was an Executive Director of Hill Samuel Ltd, 1955–1980. Colville was instrumental in raising funds for the establishment of Churchill College, Cambridge, as a national memorial to Winston Churchill, and was made an Honorary Fellow of the College in 1971.

He was joint honorary secretary of the Other Club for many years. Colville was a Trustee of both Sir Winston and Lady Churchill's estates. At various times in his life, he was Company Director of the Provident Life Association, the London Committee, the Ottoman Bank, and Eucalyptus Pulp Mills Ltd.

== Personal life ==
In 1948, Colville married Lady Margaret Egerton (1918–2004), daughter of John Egerton, 4th Earl of Ellesmere; she served as a Lady-in-Waiting to the then Princess Elizabeth from 1946 to 1949, and later to Queen Elizabeth the Queen Mother from 1990 to 2002. The Colvilles had two sons and one daughter and lived in Hampshire.

- Elizabeth Harriet Colville (born 3 December 1952); goddaughter of Queen Elizabeth II and Winston Churchill. She has served as Lady-in-Waiting to The Princess Royal since 1990. She married David James Bowes-Lyon in 1976, and had issue.
- Alexander George Colville (21 May 1955 – 24 June 2005); godson of Mary, The Princess Royal, Countess of Harewood.
- Rupert Charles Colville (born 18 January 1960); married Sarah Catherine Russell in 1991, and had issue.

== Honours and death ==
Colville was knighted in the 1974 Birthday Honours for services to Churchill College, having previously been appointed Commander of the Royal Victorian Order (CVO) in 1949 and Companion of the Order of the Bath (CB) in the 1955 Birthday Honours. He died in November 1987, aged 72.

== Legacy ==
The Jock Colville Hall at Churchill College, Cambridge, which is adjoined to the Churchill Archives Centre, is named in his honour.

Colville is portrayed by James D'Arcy in the 2009 film Into the Storm and by Nicholas Rowe in the Netflix television series The Crown.

== Bibliography ==
Colville wrote or contributed to a number of books, including:

- Fools' Pleasure, 1935
- Action This Day--Working with Churchill, 1968
- Man of Valour: Field Marshal Lord Gort V.C., 1972
- Footprints in Time, 1976
- The New Elizabethans, 1977
- The Portrait of a General, 1980
- The Churchillians, 1981
- Strange Inheritance, 1983
- The Fringes of Power: 10 Downing Street Diaries 1939–1955, 1985
- Those Lambtons!, 1988 (released posthumously)

== Notes and references ==
=== References ===
Court offices
Preceded by Michael Adeane	Page of Honour; 1927–1931	Succeeded by Viscount Errington
