= The Great Moghuls =

- Genre: History
- Developed by: Ecosse Films
- Presented by: Bamber Gascoigne
- Composers: Tim Souster; Shanti Sharma
- Country of origin: United Kingdom
- Original language: English
- No. of series: 1
- No. of episodes: 6

Production
- Executive producer: Nicholas Barton
- Producer: Douglas Rae
- Running time: 180 min. (Six 30 min. episodes)

Original release
- Network: Channel 4
- Release: 2 February – 9 March 1990

The Great Moghuls is a 1990 Channel 4 documentary series covering the story of the rise of the Moghul Empire of India over six generations as they established control and influence in the sub-continent. The six-part series was written and presented by Bamber Gascoigne based upon his 1971 book of the same name. It was produced and directed by Douglas Rae and filmed on location in India over a one-year period.

== Description ==
The Great Moghuls is a six-part series of half-hour films devoted to the lives of the most important Mughal emperors, beginning with the founder of the dynasty, Babur (reigned 1526–1530) and ending with Aurangzeb (r. 1658–1707). The second Mughal ruler, Humayun (r. 1530–1556), does not have his own film, but his successor Akbar (r. 1556–1605) gets two. The series' script was written by Bamber Gascoigne. Gascoigne based the series on his book The Great Moghuls (NY: Harper & Row, 1971).

== Episodes ==
=== 1. "Babur" ===
Through the Khyber Pass in 1526 came the founder of the great Moghul Empire, Babur. He rode around with a small band of followers seizing villages and cattle. By the time he came into India, he had built up a sizeable army and had firearms which helped him to win battles that enabled him to crown himself Emperor of India.

=== 2. "Humayun" ===
In Akbar's great palace city at Fatehpur Sikri near Agra we discover how a Great Moghul lived. Also examined are Akbar's first contacts with Europeans and his obsession with religion.

=== 3. "The Young Akbar" ===
When the second Emperor Humayun died suddenly, his thirteen-year-old son was crowned Emperor. He was called Akbar, meaning "Great". He would grow up to amply deserve the name, for he was the greatest of the Great Moghuls.

=== 4. "Aurangzeb" ===
Aurangzeb murdered two brothers to inherit the throne and imprisoned his father. He greatly extended the Moghul Empire, but Sikh resistance to his attempts to impose Islam hastened his decline.

=== 5. "Jahangir" ===
The stability of the previous reign continues, and Jahangir (r. 1605–1627) — more the aesthete and less the man of action than his father—is the right person to enjoy it. Meanwhile, drama is provided by the rivalries which surround the emperor, especially between his wife and son.

=== 6. "Shah Jahan" ===
Shah Jahan (r. 1628–1658) was something of an enigma. After murdering several relatives to secure the throne for himself, he built the world's most famous monument to love, the Taj Mahal.

== Availability ==
The series was made available on six VHS videocassettes or DVD (ca. 30 min. each; sd., col.; 1/2 in; Falls Church, VA : Landmark Media).
