= Frank Tapp =

English composer, pianist and conductor (1883 - 1953)

Frank Harold Tapp (1883 – 15 June 1953, often Frank H. Tapp, sometimes Frank W. Tapp) was a British composer, pianist and conductor associated with the City of Bath, where he was the director of the Pump Room concerts between 1910 and 1917. Tapp was an accomplished pianist, and the composer of three symphonies and other orchestral works.

== Career ==
Frank Tapp was born in Bath, making his first appearance as a pianist when he was only five. He first studied music locally with the organist Sir Percy Buck. He went on to study at the Royal College of Music, where his teachers included Charles Villiers Stanford, Sir Frederick Bridge and Charles Wood as well as John Arthur St. Oswald Dykes (piano) and William Sewell (organ).

He was appointed as the conductor of the Bath Municipal Orchestra in 1910, from where he directed the Pump Room concerts. The Pump Room was (and is) famous for its salon and light music, but Tapp also programmed new and challenging repertoire - such as the first West of England performance of Elgar's Enigma Variations, his own Symphony No. 1 The Tempest (in 1913), and Schoenberg's Five Orchestral Pieces. Over sixty symphonies, including all nine of Beethoven's, were programmed during his time there. He left the orchestra in 1917: some sources say he was sacked for programming the Schoenberg.

As a pianist he performed Liszt's Piano Concerto No. 1 with the Bournemouth Municipal Orchestra in December 1916, and made his solo debut appearance at Steinway Hall on 20 October 1917, performing Beethoven's Waldstein Sonata. In 1924 he married Kathleen Mary Vaughan. His address in 1935 was 129 Leeside Crescent, Golders Green in London. He later returned to Bath, where local orchestras continued to perform his music. By 1950 he was living at 3 Bathwick Street.

== Music ==
While he was still a student at the RCM, Tapp's Rhapsody for Two Pianos received its first performance in December 1907, with Tapp and Harold Rhodes (1889-1956) as the pianists. Another work for piano and orchestra, the Symphonic Variations (on Tom Bowling) was performed in Bournemouth on 4 November 1909, with the composer as soloist. His Rhapsody for Piano and Orchestra on a Theme from Tippereary was one of his most popular works - it was initially taken up by the touring pianist Marie Novello, but Tapp himself also played it, and there were over 400 performances. Also popular were three piano concertante works (1915, 1930 and 1935) using the tune Pop Goes the Weasel as the basis for variations.

After an initial try-out in Bath, his Tempest Symphony (a four movement work based on Shakespeare's play) was performed in Bournemouth on 17 December 1914, with the composer conducting. Jürgen Schaarwächter says the music is modelled on Elgar to a considerable degree. Only the first and third movements survive. There are also five overtures, including Metropolis, which won second prize in a competition put on by the Daily Telegraph and which was premiered at the Proms on 30 August 1934. His overture Beachy Head, which features three saxophones, was premiered in 1938 and recorded in 1942. In chamber music there is a String Trio (1909, first performed by the Walenn Trio), a Fantasy wind quintet, and a Violin Sonata (1931).

Another strand of Tapp's musical output was light music and library music. An example is the three movement English Landmarks suite. From this, the third movement 'Whitehall' achieved some popularity. It was broadcast 18 times and published by Peter Maurice & Co. Other light suites include Knick-Knacks and Land of Fancy. Individual pieces such as A Wayside Melody and Woodland Echoes were recorded by light orchestras. Light solo piano pieces include Valse Caprice (1907, published by Stainer & Bell) and the waltz Moonlight Mysteries, published by Metzler & Co. His Up for the Day suite, composed under the name Graeme Stuart, was among several pieces recorded for the Bosworth music library in the late 1940s.

== Selected works ==
- Divertimento for string orchestra
- English Landmarks, suite
- Fantasy Quintette for wind instruments
- Five Cameos for strings (performed in Bath, 1941)
- Knick Knacks, suite
- The Land of Fancy, suite
- Overtures: Metropolis, An Island Festival, Highgate Hill, Beachy Head (premiere 1938), Village Revels
- Rhapsody for two pianos (1907)
- Rhapsody for two pianos and double string orchestra
- Suite de ballet for orchestra (premiere 1923, Bournemouth)
- Suite for string orchestra, JSB (Homage to J.S. Bach)
- Symphony in E, The Tempest (1913)
- Symphony No. 2 in D
- Symphony No. 3 in Eb
- Symphonic Suite for string orchestra
- Symphonic Variations for piano and orchestra (two sets)
- Violin Sonata (1931)
