= Lady Cynthia Colville =

English courtier & social worker (1884-1968)

- Born: Lady Helen Cynthia Milnes; May 20, 1864; Westminster
- Died: June 15, 1968; Chelsea
- Occupations: Aristocrat and Social Reformer

Lady Helen Cynthia Colville DCVO DBE OStJ JP FRCM (née Milnes, later Crewe-Milnes; 20 May 1884 – 15 June 1968) was an English courtier and social worker, serving as a Woman of the Bedchamber to Queen Mary, while at the same time devoting her energies to alleviating the suffering of Shoreditch, one of the poorest areas of the East End of London.

== Family ==
Colville was the third daughter of Robert Milnes, who succeeded when she was 15 months old as 2nd Baron Houghton (giving her the style "The Honourable"), by his first wife Sibyl, daughter of Sir Frederick Graham (of the Graham baronets of Netherby) and Lady Jane St Maur. She had an older sister, an older brother, and a twin sister.

Her mother died young, and Cynthia and her siblings lived for a time with their unmarried uncle, the 3rd Baron Crewe, before rejoining their father, a Liberal politician when he was posted to Dublin as Lord Lieutenant of Ireland (from 1892 to 1895).

In 1895, having inherited Lord Crewe's estates on his death the previous year, her father adopted the surname Crewe-Milnes and was created Earl of Crewe, giving her the style of "Lady". In 1899, Lord Crewe remarried to Lady Margaret Etrenne Hannah "Peggy" Primrose (1881–1951), daughter of the 5th Earl of Rosebery, Liberal Prime Minister from 1894 to 1895, and his wife Hannah, an heiress to the Rothschild fortune. Cynthia's new stepmother was only 18; Cynthia and her stepmother were but three years apart in age.

After studying music at the Royal College of Music for four years, where her piano teacher was John Arthur St. Oswald Dykes, she married the Honourable George Charles Colville, younger son of the 1st Viscount Colville of Culross and his wife Cecile (née Carrington), on 21 January 1908. Their children were:

- David Richard Colville (b. 11 May 1909 – d. 9 February 1987)
- Major Philip Robert Colville (b. 7 November 1910 – d. 11 April 1997)
- Sir John Rupert Colville (b. 28 January 1915 – d. 19 November 1987), the diarist.

== Work ==
She started her work in Shoreditch, which was a slum (a "socially derelict square mile", as her son described the area), before World War I, focusing on infant mortality. The Socialist borough council co-opted her to their public health committee.

In September 1950, she was elected the first chairman of the British Epilepsy Association.

In February 1952 while serving as Woman of the Bedchamber to Queen Mary it fell to Colville to inform Queen Mary of the death of her son George VI.

In 1952 she was appointed a lay justice at Bow Street Magistrates' Court.

== Other ==
She raised eyebrows when she introduced a commoner, Thomas Benjamin Frederick Davis, albeit a self-made man, into her own stratum of society, persuading the Queen to invite him to dinner on the royal yacht HMY Victoria and Albert at the Cowes Week regatta.

== Memorials ==
In 1948, Shoreditch Council renamed a housing estate on Felton Street estate as "the Colville estate" in honour of her long association. In 1963, Lady Cynthia published her autobiography, Crowded Life: The Autobiography of Lady Cynthia Colville.

== Honours and awards ==
- She was appointed Officer of the Most Venerable Order of the Hospital of St John of Jerusalem (OStJ)
- She held the office of Justice of the Peace (JP) for the County of London
- She held the office of Woman of the Bedchamber to HM Queen Mary between 1923 and 1953
- She was appointed Dame Commander of the Royal Victorian Order (DCVO) on 11 May 1937
- She was invested as a Fellow of the Royal College of Music (FRCM) in 1948
- She was appointed Dame Commander of the Order of the British Empire (DBE) in 1953
- She was awarded the honorary degree of Doctor of Law (LL.D.) by Leeds University

She is one of the very few "double dames", having been created a dame in two separate orders: the Order of the British Empire and the Royal Victorian Order.

== Death ==
She died on 15 June 1968, aged 84, at 4 Mulberry Walk, Chelsea, London, England.

== Citations ==
- L. G. Pine, The New Extinct Peerage 1884–1971: Containing Extinct, Abeyant, Dormant and Suspended Peerages With Genealogies and Arms (London, UK: Heraldry Today, 1972), page 90
- Charles Mosley, editor, Burke's Peerage, Baronetage & Knightage, 107th edition, 3 volumes (Wilmington, Delaware:Burke's Peerage (Genealogical Books) Ltd., 2003), volume 1, page 867
