= Franklin Taylor =

English pianist and teacher (1843–1919)

Franklin Taylor (5 February 1843 – 19 March 1919) was an English pianist, organist, music educator, and writer on music. He was a pupil of Clara Schumann.

== Early life and education ==
Born in Birmingham, Franklin Taylor showed early promise as a pianist but had his first training as a church musician, becoming a resident pupil of Thomas Bedsmore (1833-1881) at Lichfield Cathedral. Returning to Birmingham he was appointed organist of The Old Meeting House while still a young teenager.

In 1859 he was sent to Leipzig to train as a pianist at the Leipzig Conservatory with Louis Plaidy and Ignaz Moscheles. British musicians he met there at the time included Walter Bache (also from Birmingham), John Francis Barnett and Arthur Sullivan. In the winter of 1861-1862 he went to Paris to study with Clara Schumann, concentrating entirely on the music of Robert Schumann. He become an important exponent of Schumann's methods in piano pedagogy.

== Teacher and performer ==
Later in 1862 he returned to England and became a teacher (his first pupil was Lucy Grove, daughter of George Grove, and later he taught Frederic Cliffe, Herbert Fryer, Battison Haynes, Ethel Hobday and Mathilde Verne), organist (succeeding Sullivan at St Michael's Church, Chester Square, in 1867), and a celebrated concert pianist in London in the 1860s and 1870s. He was a regular performer at The Crystal Palace concerts during this period - for instance, playing Ferdinand Hiller's Piano Concerto in F sharp minor there on 18 February 1965 - and made his first appearance at the Monday Popular Concerts at St James's Hall on 15 June 1866, playing Beethoven. During this period he shared rooms in London (George Street, Euston Square) with Carl Rosa, then best known as a violinist. He gave up holding church appointments in 1869.

In 1876 Taylor was appointed to the piano faculty of the National Training School of Music. When the school was absorbed into the newly created Royal College of Music in 1882 he was appointed professor of piano at that institution; a post he held until his retirement in 1916. (Another Clara Schumann pupil, John Arthur St. Oswald Dykes, was a contemporary there). From 1891 to 1893 he was director of the Royal Philharmonic Society.

== Publications ==
Taylor authored several influential piano pedagogy texts, some of which are still in use. These include Technique and Expression in Pianoforte Playing (London, 1897), Primer of Pianoforte Playing (London, 1877), and Progressive Studies for the Pianoforte (London, 1893–4), the latter spanning fifty-six books and containing 600 examples. He also authored several entries in the early editions of Grove's Dictionary of Music and Musicians. He was the composer of a Toy Symphony, scored for piano and toy instruments, in the 1850s.

Franklin Taylor died in London on 19 March 1919, aged 76.
