= John Arthur St. Oswald Dykes =

English pianist and teacher

John Arthur St. Oswald Dykes (27 October 1863 - 31 January 1948) was a pianist and teacher, the son of John B Dykes. He was born in Elvet and named after St Oswald's Church in Durham, where his father had been appointed choirmaster and vicar in 1862. As a child, John Arthur sometimes used to play the organ there at services.

A pupil of Joachim Raff and Clara Schumann, he was professor of piano at the Royal College of Music for over 50 years, from 1889 until 1941. (Another Clara Schumann pupil, Franklin Taylor, was a contemporary at the RCM, from 1882 until his retirement in 1916). Dykes was photographed in the RCM staff picture taken at the laying of the foundation of the Blomfield Building in Prince Consort Road on 8 July, 1890.

Naturally shy and modest, Dykes avoided frequent public performances with the exception of the 'Monday Pops' concerts at St James's Hall in London in the 1890s. In April 1910 he was one of five Clara Schumann students (the others were Leonard Borwick, Fanny Davies, Ilona Eibenschütz and Mathilde Verne) to celebrate Robert Schumann's centenary in a series of three concerts at Bechstein Hall.

His students included Richard Arnell, Rutland Boughton, Edward Godfrey Brown, Sir Percy Buck, Cynthia Colville, Leslie Fly and Frank Tapp. He composed the hymn tune The Sacred Heart, used to set the words 'Draw nigh and take the body of the lord'. He died at the age of 85 in London, at 48 Campden Street, Kensington, and is buried in Putney Vale Cemetery, Wimbledon.
