= Epilepsy Action =

British charitable organisation

- Formation: 5 September 1950; 76 years ago
- Founder: Lady Cynthia Colville
- Type: Charitable organisation
- Registration no.: 234343
- Headquarters: Yeadon, West Yorkshire, United Kingdom
- Coordinates: 53.86441°N 1.69408°W
- Services: Epilepsy advice and information
- Members: 7,494 (2023)
- President: Margaret Ford, Baroness Ford
- Chair: Jane Riley
- Chief executive: Rebekah Smith
- Revenue: £2.77m (2023)
- Staff: 75 (2023)
- Website: www.epilepsy.org.uk
- Formerly called: British Epilepsy Association (1950–2002)

Epilepsy Action is a UK-based charity dedicated to supporting people with epilepsy, raising awareness, and campaigning for better services and treatment for individuals affected by the condition. Founded in 1950, the charity provides information, resources, and services to help people with epilepsy live their lives with confidence and dignity.

== Mission ==
Epilepsy Action’s mission is to create a world without limits for people with epilepsy. The charity aims to improve the lives of people living with epilepsy through advocacy, education, and community engagement. Their core belief is that no one should be limited by their condition, and they work tirelessly to reduce stigma and improve public understanding of epilepsy.

== Vision for 2030 ==
By 2030, Epilepsy Action envisions a future where:

1. Every person with epilepsy in the UK feels that their life has improved through the work the charity achieves with them and for them.
2. Epilepsy is widely understood, with the general public knowing what epilepsy is, how to support those living with the condition, and how to help fight the stigma surrounding it.
3. Epilepsy Action is fully inclusive in all aspects of its work, ensuring that everyone — regardless of background, age, or circumstance — has access to the support, information, and services they need.

== Core services ==
Epilepsy Action offers a wide range of services to support people with epilepsy:

- Information & Advice: The charity provides free, accessible information on managing epilepsy, available treatments, and legal rights.
- Support: Through helplines, online resources, support groups and befriending, Epilepsy Action offers emotional and practical assistance to people living with epilepsy and their families.
- Campaigning & Advocacy: Epilepsy Action campaigns for policy changes and better services for those with epilepsy, with a focus on health, education, and employment.
- Training & Education: The charity provides training to healthcare professionals, employers, and schools to help them support people with epilepsy more effectively.

== Campaigns and awareness ==
Epilepsy Action runs a range of campaigns aimed at raising awareness about epilepsy and breaking down the stigma often associated with the condition. These initiatives engage the public and provide better education on how epilepsy affects millions of people worldwide. Notable campaigns include:

- Purple Day: The international day of epilepsy awareness, when individuals and organizations around the world wear purple and take part in a range of activities to raise funds to increase awareness of epilepsy.
- Doodle Day: A unique fundraising event where participants create and submit their own doodles, which are then auctioned to raise money for Epilepsy Action so they can continue to support people with epilepsy. It’s a creative way to engage the public in supporting the epilepsy community.
- International Epilepsy Week: A week dedicated to raising global awareness of epilepsy, with events, educational activities, and initiatives aimed at increasing understanding, improving treatment, and eliminating stigma. Epilepsy Action actively participates in this week through public events, and social media campaigns.

These campaigns are vital in Epilepsy Action’s mission to reduce stigma, increase understanding, and improve the quality of life for those living with epilepsy.

== Achievements ==
The charity has received international media coverage on a number of occasions due to its work in highlighting bad practice in online videos in relation to photosensitive epilepsy.

- In 2007, it claimed that 30 people had seizures as a result of a segment of animated footage commissioned by the organising committee of the London 2012 Summer Olympics to promote its logo.
- In 2011, Epilepsy Action highlighted issues with the video for the Kanye West song "All of the Lights". Tests of the video showed that it failed the flashing images guidelines set down by UK broadcasting watchdog Ofcom and so was likely to trigger a seizure in someone with photosensitive epilepsy. A warning was placed on YouTube for people watching the video on its website.
- In 2015, it highlighted the presence of advertisements with flashing content that were posted on Vine by Twitter. The Advertising Standards Authority confirmed that Twitter were in breach of its guidelines.
