= George Waller (VC) =

Recipient of the Victoria Cross

- Born: June 1827; West Horsley, Surrey
- Died: 16 January 1877 (aged 49); Hurstpierpoint, West Sussex
- Burial place: Holy Trinity Churchyard, Hurstpierpoint
- Military career
- Allegiance: United Kingdom
- Branch: British Army
- Rank: Colour-Sergeant
- Units: 60th Rifles
- Conflicts: Second Anglo-Sikh War; Indian Mutiny
- Awards: Victoria Cross

George Waller VC (June 1827 – 10 January 1877) was a soldier and English recipient of the Victoria Cross, the highest and most prestigious award for gallantry in the face of the enemy that can be awarded to British and Commonwealth forces.

== Life ==
He was born on 1 June 1827 in West Horsley, Surrey. He enlisted in the army and initially served with the 39th (Dorsetshire) Regiment of Foot. He transferred to the 60th Rifles, sailing to India in 1845.

=== Details of VC ===
Waller was about 30 years old, and a colour-sergeant in the 1st Battalion, 60th Rifles (later The King's Royal Rifle Corps), British Army during the Indian Mutiny when the following deed took place at Delhi, British India for which he was awarded the VC.

For conspicuous bravery at Delhi on the 14th of September, 1857, in charging and capturing the Enemy's guns near the Cabul Gate; and again, on the 18th of September, 1857, in the repulse of a sudden attack made by the Enemy on a gun near the Chaudney Chouk. Elected by the Non-Commissioned Officers of the Regiment.

==== The medal ====
His Victoria Cross is displayed at the Royal Green Jackets (Rifles) Museum, Winchester, England.

=== Later life ===
He was discharged from the army on 7 March 1865. However, he went on to serve as a permanent instructor to the 13th Sussex Rifle Volunteers. He was also a publican. He died on 16 January 1877. He is buried at Holy Trinity Churchyard, Hurstpierpoint.
