= HistoryWorld =

Online encyclopedia

HistoryWorld is an interactive online history encyclopaedia that seeks to make world history more easily accessible through interactive narratives and timelines. It was established by Bamber Gascoigne who started developing it in 1994. It went online in June 2001 and in 2002 it won the New Statesman New Media award for the best educational website. In 2007 Gascoigne launched a related site, at TimeSearch, using timelines as a way of searching the internet.

HistoryWorld currently consists of about 300 narratives and some 10,000 events on searchable timelines. All the content (apart from "The Wellcome History of Medicine", by Dr Carole Reeves) has been written by Gascoigne.

The HistoryWorld website, which is free to use, also contains more than 5000 entries from Gascoigne's Encyclopedia of Britain, originally published by Macmillan in 1993, and a pilot project, Places in History for Richmond-upon-Thames, which uses placemarks in Google Maps to identify the exact position of a building, street or other feature, with a satellite view of the location. The maps then link to pages in HistoryWorld for historical details, images and timelines.

Harvey McGavin, writing in the TES, said that the history website "is remarkably easy to navigate" and "should help teachers and pupils find all the answers".
