= Margaret Crewe-Milnes, Marchioness of Crewe =

20th-century English justice of the peace

The Most Honourable The Marchioness of Crewe CI JP
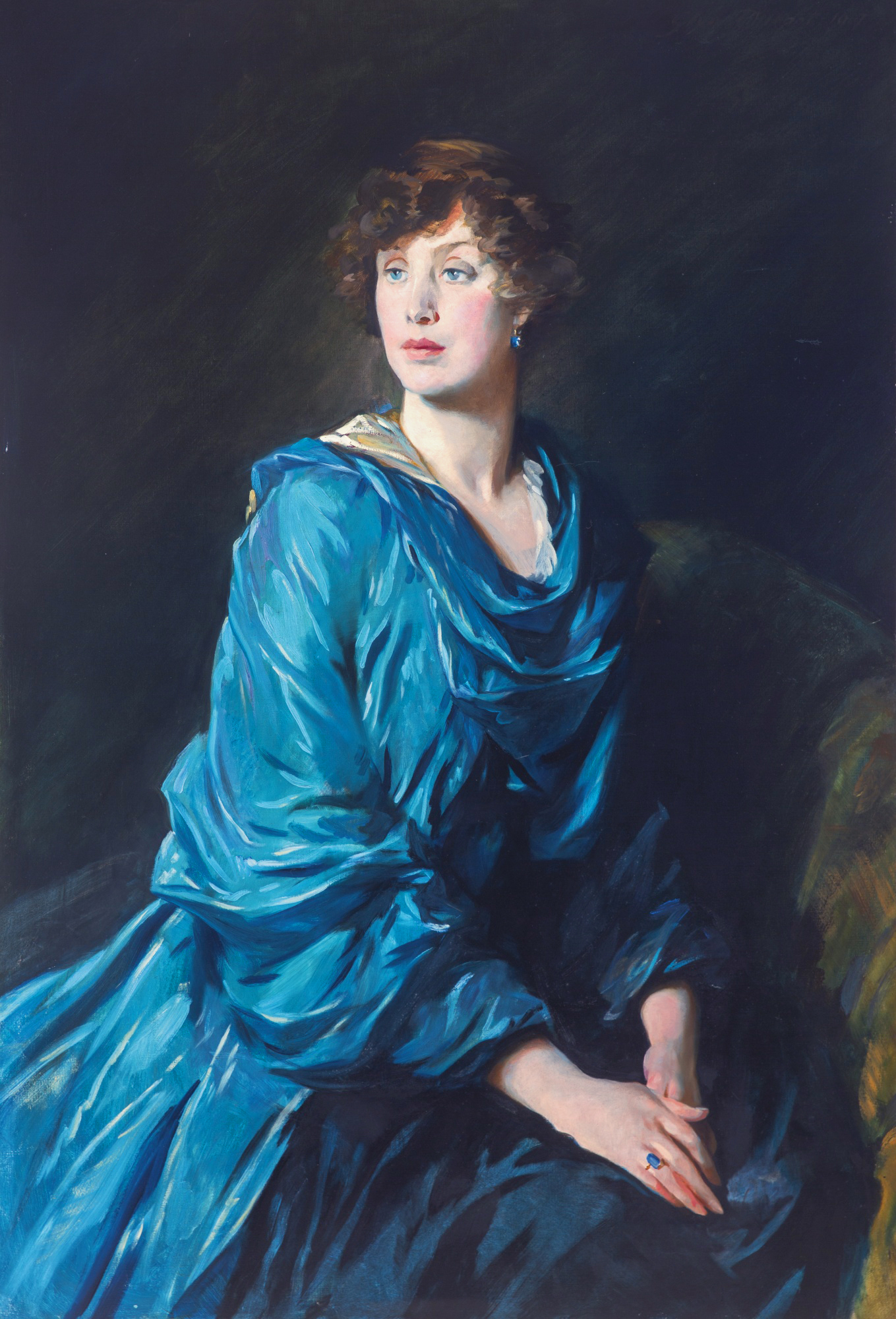
- Portrait of Margaret Crewe-Milnes, Marchioness of Crewe, by Glyn Philpot
- Born: Lady Margaret Etienne Hannah Primrose; 1 January 1881; Epsom, Surrey, United Kingdom
- Died: 13 March 1967 (aged 86); Westminster, London, United Kingdom
- Other names: Peggy Crewe-Milnes, Marchioness of Crewe
- Spouse: Robert Crewe-Milnes, 1st Marquess of Crewe (m. 1899; died 1945)
- Children: Richard Crewe-Milnes, Earl of Madeley; Mary Innes-Ker, Duchess of Roxburghe
- Parents: Archibald Primrose, 5th Earl of Rosebery (father); Hannah de Rothschild (mother)
- Relatives: Lady Sybil Grant (sister); Harry Primrose, 6th Earl of Rosebery (brother); The Hon. Neil Primrose (brother)

Margaret Etienne Hannah Crewe-Milnes, Marchioness of Crewe CI JP (1 January 1881 – 13 March 1967), styled as Countess of Crewe from 1899 until 1911, was a British heiress and socialite, and after the death in 1929 of her father, the former Prime Minister Archibald Primrose, 5th Earl of Rosebery, she was said to be the richest woman in England. From 1922 she spent six years in Paris after her husband was made British Ambassador to France.

During World War II she was much involved with organizations to help Free French in Britain, founding the French in Great Britain Fund in 1940. After the war, in June 1946 she was awarded the highest French order of merit, the Knight of the Legion of Honour. She and her husband bought West Horsley Place in Surrey on their return from Paris. She was also decorated with the award of Imperial Order of the Crown of India.

She was one of the first female justices of the peace in London, appointed as a magistrate in 1919 after the passing of the Sex Disqualification (Removal) Act 1919.

== Early life ==
Her mother, Hannah, was the daughter of Baron Mayer de Rothschild and her father was Archibald Philip Primrose, 5th Earl of Rosebery. She was born in The Durdans, Epsom, Surrey, the second of their children, after her older sister, Sybil. She also had two younger brothers, Harry and Neil. She was nine years old when her mother died in 1890. Lady Margaret was known as "Peggy" to her friends and family.

== Marriage and children ==
She married Robert Offley Ashburton Crewe-Milnes, the Earl of Crewe, at Westminster Abbey on 15 April 1899. According to The New York Times, the wedding had "no parallel in recent history, except for the Queen's Jubilee," which they attributed to her father's political career. At her wedding, Crewe-Milnes received a number of rare books as wedding gifts from her guests.

In 1911, Crewe-Milnes had two children: a son, Richard (1911–1922), and a daughter, Mary Crewe-Milnes, who was born in 1915 and married George Innes-Ker, the 9th Duke of Roxburghe, in 1935.

== Death ==
Lady Crewe died in 1967 in her home on 50 Charles St. in Westminster, London, and was buried beside the Marquess at Barthomley, Cheshire.

== Titles ==
- 1881–1899: Lady Margaret Primrose
- 1899–1911: The Right Honourable The Countess of Crewe
- 1911–1945: The Most Honourable The Marchioness of Crewe
- 1945–1967: The Most Honourable The Dowager Marchioness of Crewe
