= Robert Crewe-Milnes, 1st Marquess of Crewe =

British politician and diplomat (1858–1945)

The Most Honourable The Marquess of Crewe KG PC FSA
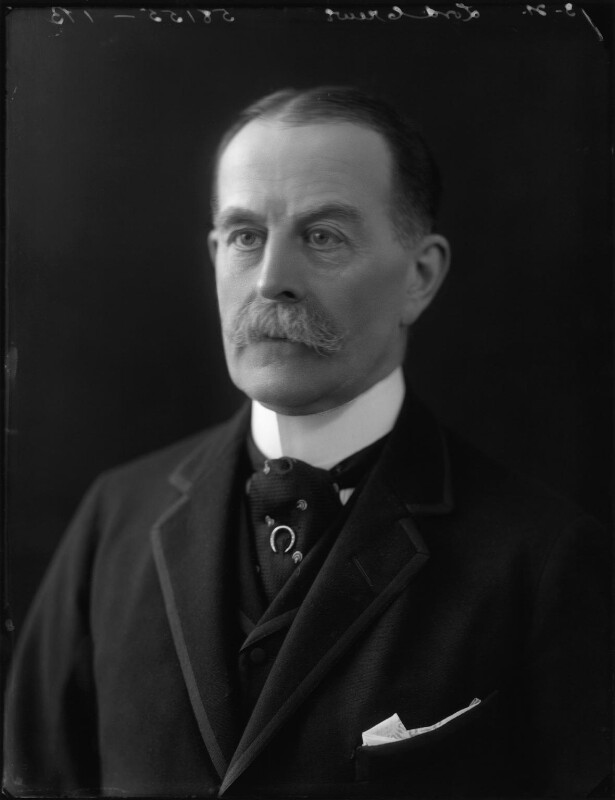
- Crewe in 1921

Secretary of State for War
- In office 25 August 1931 – 5 November 1931
- Monarch: George V
- Prime Minister: Ramsay MacDonald
- Preceded by: Thomas Shaw
- Succeeded by: The 1st Viscount Hailsham

His Majesty's Ambassador to France
- In office 1922–1928
- Monarch: George V
- Prime Minister: Bonar Law; Stanley Baldwin
- Preceded by: The 1st Baron Hardinge of Penshurst
- Succeeded by: Sir William Tyrrell

Leader of the House of Lords
- In office 14 April 1908 – 10 December 1916
- Monarchs: Edward VII; George V
- Prime Minister: H. H. Asquith
- Preceded by: The 1st Marquess of Ripon
- Succeeded by: The 1st Earl Curzon of Kedleston

Lord President of the Council
- In office 25 May 1915 – 10 December 1916
- Monarch: George V
- Prime Minister: H. H. Asquith
- Preceded by: The 7th Earl Beauchamp
- Succeeded by: The 1st Earl Curzon of Kedleston
- In office 10 December 1905 – 12 April 1908
- Monarch: Edward VII
- Prime Minister: Sir Henry Campbell-Bannerman
- Preceded by: The 6th Marquess of Londonderry
- Succeeded by: The 2nd Baron Tweedmouth

Lord Privy Seal
- In office 13 February 1912 – 25 May 1915
- Monarch: George V
- Prime Minister: H. H. Asquith
- Preceded by: The 1st Earl Carrington
- Succeeded by: The 1st Earl Curzon of Kedleston
- In office 9 October 1908 – 23 October 1911
- Monarchs: Edward VII; George V
- Prime Minister: H. H. Asquith
- Preceded by: The 1st Marquess of Ripon
- Succeeded by: The 1st Earl Carrington

President of the Board of Education
- In office 18 August 1916 – 10 December 1916
- Monarch: George V
- Prime Minister: H. H. Asquith
- Preceded by: Arthur Henderson
- Succeeded by: Herbert Fisher

Secretary of State for India
- In office 25 May 1911 – 25 May 1915
- Monarch: George V
- Prime Minister: H. H. Asquith
- Preceded by: The 1st Viscount Morley of Blackburn
- Succeeded by: Austen Chamberlain
- In office 3 November 1910 – 7 March 1911
- Monarch: George V
- Prime Minister: H. H. Asquith
- Preceded by: John Morley, 1st Viscount Morley of Blackburn
- Succeeded by: John Morley, 1st Viscount Morley of Blackburn

Secretary of State for the Colonies
- In office 12 April 1908 – 3 November 1910
- Monarchs: Edward VII; George V
- Prime Minister: H. H. Asquith
- Preceded by: Victor Bruce, 9th Earl of Elgin
- Succeeded by: Lewis Harcourt

Lord Lieutenant of Ireland
- In office 18 August 1892 – 29 June 1895
- Monarch: Queen Victoria
- Prime Minister: William Ewart Gladstone; The 5th Earl of Rosebery
- Preceded by: The 3rd Earl of Zetland
- Succeeded by: The 5th Earl Cadogan

Lord-in-Waiting Government Whip
- In office 16 February 1886 – 20 July 1886
- Monarch: Queen Victoria
- Prime Minister: William Ewart Gladstone
- Preceded by: The 15th Lord Elphinstone
- Succeeded by: The 15th Lord Elphinstone

Member of the House of Lords Lord Temporal
- In office 12 August 1885 – 20 June 1945; Hereditary peerage
- Preceded by: The 1st Baron Houghton
- Succeeded by: Peerage extinct

Personal details
- Born: Robert Offley Ashburton Milnes; 12 January 1858
- Died: 20 June 1945 (aged 87)
- Party: Liberal
- Spouse(s): (1) Sibyl Graham (d. 1887) (2) Lady Margaret Primrose
- Children: 6, including Cynthia and Mary
- Parent: The 1st Baron Houghton (father)
- Education: Trinity College, Cambridge

Robert Offley Ashburton Crewe-Milnes, 1st Marquess of Crewe (12 January 1858 – 20 June 1945), known as The Honourable Robert Milnes from 1863 to 1885, The Lord Houghton from 1885 to 1895, and as The Earl of Crewe from 1895 to 1911, was a British Liberal politician, statesman and writer. He was the maternal grandfather of the former Prime Minister of Northern Ireland Captain Terence O'Neill.

== Early life ==
Robert Offley Ashburton Milnes was born at 16 Upper Brook Street, Mayfair, London, the only son of Richard Monckton Milnes, 1st Baron Houghton, by his wife the Hon. Annabella Crewe, daughter of John Crewe, 2nd Baron Crewe, and was educated firstly at Winton House, near Winchester, and then Harrow. He went up to Trinity College, Cambridge, graduating in 1880.

== Political career ==
A Liberal in politics, Milnes became Assistant Private Secretary to Lord Granville in April 1883 when Granville was Foreign Secretary. In 1884 he was the chosen as the prospective Liberal candidate for the new seat of Barnsley, but never contested the seat as in August 1885, before the general election in November, he succeeded to his father's peerage and seat in the House of Lords. As Baron Houghton, he was made a Liberal whip in 1885. In January 1886 he was made a Lord-in-waiting to Queen Victoria during the Third Gladstone ministry, and remained a Home Ruler.

Prepared for ministerial success, a severe blow was struck to a burgeoning political career: his wife Sybil Marcia, daughter of Sir Frederick Ulric Graham, 3rd Baronet, of Netherby, whom he had married on 3 June 1880, died suddenly in September 1887, still only thirty years old. He was determined to get over this personal tragedy by studying agriculture at the Royal Agricultural College. However, he was prevented by illness from pursuing his studies. Leaving England, he travelled to Egypt, where he wrote Stray Verses in a mournful lament at his great loss. Further melancholy hit hard when his eight-year-old son and heir Richard died in 1890.

Returning to Houghton in 1892, he was appointed as Lord Lieutenant of Ireland in the Liberal government, 1892–1895, in which his old friend Lord Rosebery eventually became prime minister.

On the death of his uncle, Hungerford Crewe, 3rd Baron Crewe, he inherited vast estates of nearly 50,000 acres in four counties, and assumed the same year the additional surname of Crewe by royal licence on 8 June 1894. On 17 July 1895 he was created Earl of Crewe, in the County palatine of Chester.

On 20 April 1899, Crewe married secondly an eighteen-year-old society beauty, Lady Margaret Etrenne Hannah Primrose, daughter of the former Prime Minister Lord Rosebery.

The Second Boer War broke out only months later in October. Crewe remained a leader of the conciliators who to the last tried to find a negotiated settlement with President Paul Kruger. He began to grow apart from his father-in-law's Liberal imperialism, advocating a gradualist "step-by-step" policy of containment of the situation. But the war soon escalated, with Crewe finding himself isolated. He was not much of an orator, but had skills in administration, proving an efficient organizer. He became increasingly influential with Henry Campbell-Bannerman and the Radicals. He made a personal friend out of H. H. Asquith, who was his political mainstay in the round of intrigues that intensified during the lead-up to the First World War. A close confidante, he was appointed as an aide on almost every committee. From 1905 to 1908 he was Lord President of the Council in the Liberal government. The House of Lords, dominated by Tory peers, was hostile to Asquith's proposed reforms. It wrecked the Education Bill of 1906, while Crewe stood out as the main defender of the Cabinet's policy. In response to pleas from Campbell-Bannerman, he assumed the role of cross-party convenor. Crewe was moderate in all things. He deplored David Lloyd George's Limehouse Speech in the east end of London in support of the People's Budget. By the same token, he found it unacceptable for die-hard Tories and Unionists to continue to block legislation.

Although Lord Elgin reassured him of Winston Churchill's friendliness among Liberals, Crewe was in for a rude shock: he had succeeded the orientalist Elgin as Secretary of State for the Colonies, and in May 1908 he had an angry exchange of letters with Churchill, who had intervened in a colonial debate in the Commons. Crewe could be haughty and coldly disapproving: like Grey, he took a dim view of Lloyd George's People's Budget, but it was Crewe's job to steer it through the Lords. In his capacity as Leader of the House of Lords, he played a key role in bringing the Parliament Act 1911 (depriving the Lords of its veto) to the floor of the house and eventually onto the statute book. Asquith valued him highly as a colleague, for his common sense and sound judgment rather than any exceptional brilliance. But when Churchill circulated a memorandum proposing the abolition of the Lords in 1910, Crewe remained essentially whiggish and cautious, blocking any attempt to change the bicameral relationship. He sat on the Constitutional Conference Commission set up on 16 June 1910 during the crisis following Edward VII's death. The inconclusive outcome of the January 1910 election, which increased Unionist representation in the Commons, caused a wide-ranging debate on the constitutional implications of the Lords' powers. The new king, George V, to obviate a stalemate agreed to create 500 new peers, should the Liberals win the December 1910 election. Crewe was present at the discussions as one of the Inner Sanctum in the cabinet. He had previously taken a more right-wing position with Asquith, arguing for reform of the membership of the Upper House, rather than of its customary powers. Crewe was selected to face leading Tory Lord Cromer, and the Archbishop of Canterbury, Randall Davidson, in negotiation of the provisions of the Veto bill, which would give a whip hand to an elected Commons.

It was Crewe's colonial responsibilities from September 1910 as part of his terms as Secretary of State for India (1910–11 and 1911–15), for which he gained the hoped-for promotion in the peerage. The Delhi Durbar was an invention of his genius for organization, designed to the last detail for the first British monarch in history to pay a visit to India. In that post, he was responsible for the moving of the capital of India from Calcutta to Delhi, and the reunion of the two Bengals under a Governor-in-Council, as well as commissioning the architect, Sir Edwin Lutyens for his outstanding visionary grand design of New Delhi. He was further honoured in 1911 when he was created Earl of Madeley and Marquess of Crewe.

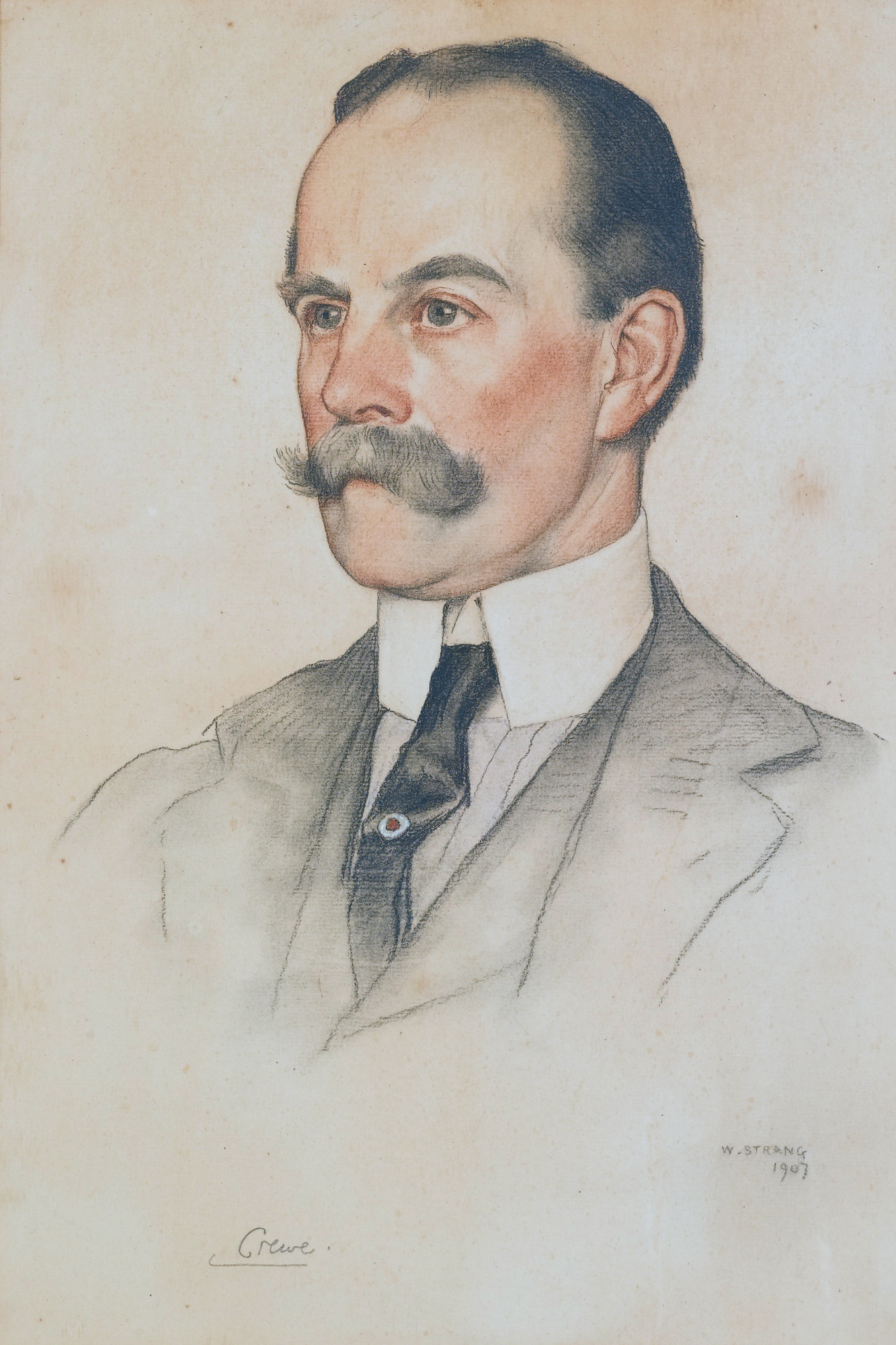
Robert Offley Ashburton Milnes, 1st Marquess of Crewe, by William Strang, 1907

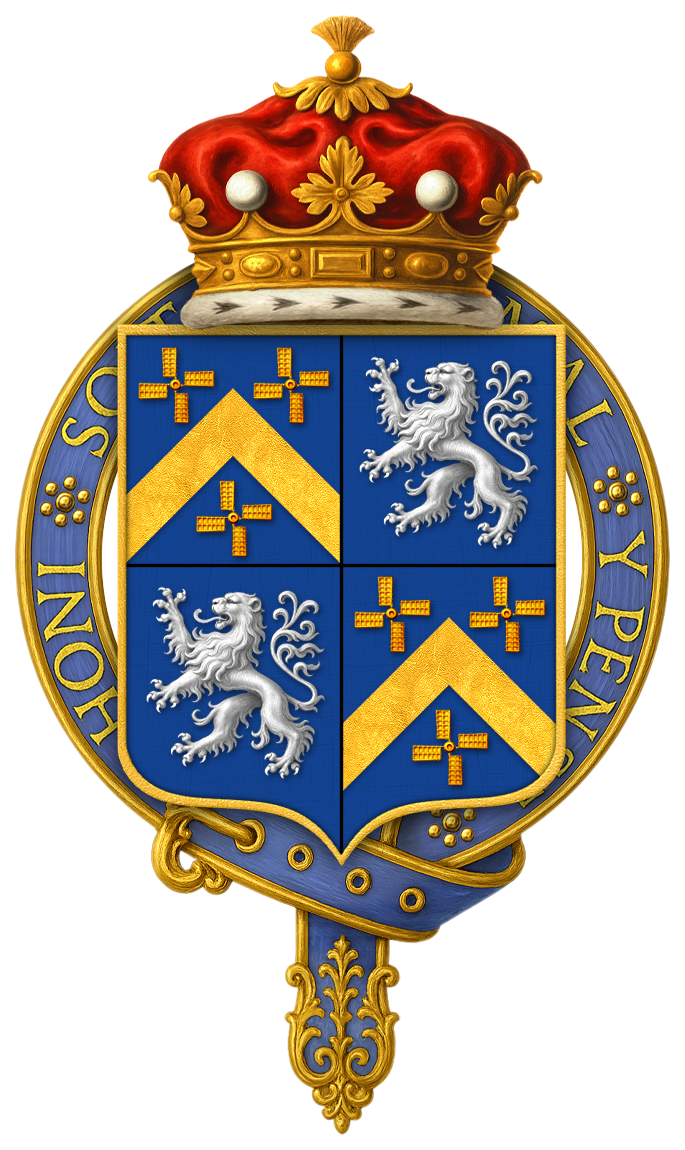
Garter-encircled arms of Robert Offley Ashburton Crewe-Milnes, 1st Marquess of Crewe, KG, PC, FSA

In at least one of Asquith's cabinet lists of 1913–14, Crewe was at the top; but other ministers, like Churchill, were more thrusting at pushing themselves forward for promotion. Crewe was widely respected for his administrative competence, efficiency and personal intelligence. Crewe served as Lord President of the Council again from May 1915, coming second in Asquith's rankings and working closely with Lloyd George on currency and exchange rate stabilisation in the budget. His Westminster base, Crewe House, Curzon Street, Mayfair, became a centre for war propaganda.

In 1916, Crewe was appointed briefly as President of the Board of Education, and may have been useful in the post-war educational sector, but the Asquith coalition split in December. He remained as ever, an Asquithian, declining office under Lloyd George, and after his resignation he continued to lead the independent Liberal opposition in the House of Lords. He took the largely honorific title of Chairman of London County Council. He maintained roles in the education sector, serving as Chairman of the Governing Body of Imperial College London (1907–22), and Chancellor of Sheffield University. He was later Ambassador to France, appointed by Bonar Law from October 1922 to 1928. In that role, he launched a fund for the creation of a British Institute in Paris, which has since developed into the University of London Institute in Paris (ULIP). He had a very brief ten-week stint as Secretary of State for War in Ramsay MacDonald's National Coalition from August 1931, but did not hold office after the general election. In 1932, the Samuelite Liberals withdrew over free trade from the National Coalition. From 1936 and throughout the Second World War, Crewe was leader of the independent Liberals in the House of Lords. He served as Lord High Constable of England for the coronation of King George VI and Queen Elizabeth.

=== Public-speaker ===
Crewe did not much like public speaking, but that was probably because he contrasted sharply with Lloyd George's firebrand delivery and populist demagogy. Crewe himself tended to hesitate too long with "pregnant pauses", as his speech became stilted. He was above all fastidious, in the royal tradition of Charles I. Edwin Montagu claimed, somewhat sardonically, that one of his female constituents died of boredom listening to the Marquess of Crewe. His father-in-law, Lord Rosebery, had been Liberal Leader six years before he himself became Leader in the House of Lords of that party. Rosebery thought Crewe a reliable politician but a poor speaker. When it was announced to him that his daughter, the Marchioness of Crewe, was in labour, Rosebery is said to have quipped "I hope that her delivery is not as slow as Crewe's". Always at ease in London High Society, Crewe hosted the dinner party at which Winston Churchill met Clementine Hozier.

=== Political positions ===
Crewe voiced his support during his time in Parliament for numerous reforms, including the creation of old-age pensions, an eight-hour day for miners, and meal provisions for schoolchildren. In November 1905, Crewe had written to then party leader Henry Campbell-Bannerman of the need for innovative reform on the part of the Liberals, noting that

More than ever before, the Liberal Party is on its trial as an engine for securing social reforms, – taxation, land, housing, etc. It has to resist the I.L.P. claim to be the only friend of the workers. Can it do this and attempt Home Rule as well?

During the Liberal party crises of 1886, 1909–11, and 1916, Crewe stayed loyal to the party. He was also said to have acknowledged the damage the First World War did to liberalism. When he died, the Tory Lord Salisbury described Crewe as "the best of the whig statesmen". One historian believed his whiggery was more temperamental than ideological. Reserved and stiff upper-lipped by nature, he sought compromise by mediation, attempting to negotiate a middle way. His meetings were often spontaneous and informal, but dominated by an aristocratic clique: Lloyd George recalled how in 1912 Crewe had tried at Deeside to resolve Ulster's longstanding problems with Bonar Law over a round of golf.

== Literary work ==
Crewe inherited his father's literary tastes, and published for public consumption Stray Verses in 1890, besides other miscellaneous literary work, including Gleanings from Béranger (privately printed in 1889), much of which he translated. A war poem, A Harrow Grave in Flanders—which touches on the theme of "what might have been"—was published in several anthologies during and following World War I. Lord Crewe was the last of the Liberal grandees at the end of Empire. He was essentially by character a Victorian, and this showed in his austere reverential writings that took few risks with the material.

Soon after the death of his father-in-law the 5th Earl of Rosebery in 1929, the family asked Crewe to write his biography. The two-volume Lord Rosebery was published by John Murray in 1931. Crewe's dedication reads "To my wife – this attempt to tell the story of one we both loved".

== Death ==
Crewe died on 20 June 1945 at the age of 87. His body was buried in the graveyard of Saint Bertoline's Church in the Cheshire village of Barthomley. As he had no surviving male heir, both his sons (one from each marriage) having died in childhood, his titles became extinct upon his death.

== Family ==
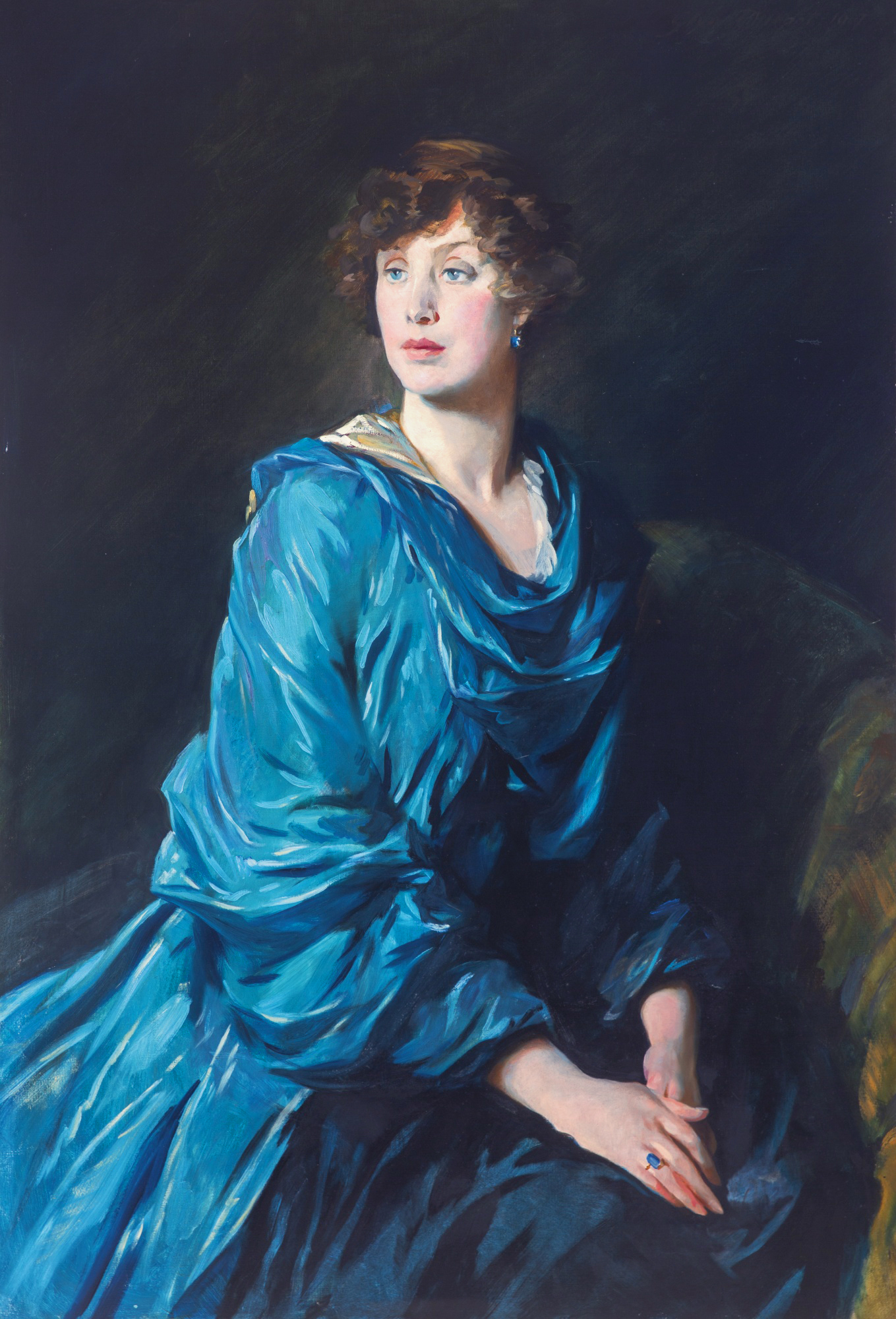
Margaret (Peggy) Crewe-Milnes, Marchioness of Crewe (Glyn Philpot, 1917)

Crewe married twice. In 1880, he married Sibyl Marcia Graham (1857–1887), daughter of Sir Frederick Graham, 3rd Baronet, of Netherby in the County of Cumberland. They had three daughters and one son, who died as a child:

- Lady Annabel Crewe-Milnes (1881–1948). She married twice. In 1903, she married Arthur O'Neill (1876–1914), later Ulster Unionist MP for Mid Antrim. Their third son, Terence O'Neill, was to become Prime Minister of Northern Ireland. Her second marriage was to Hugh Dodds to whom she bore two sons, the writer Quentin Crewe and Colin Crewe.
- Hon. Richard Charles Rodes Milnes (1882–1890), died in childhood.
- Lady Celia Hermione Crewe-Milnes (1884–1985), twin with her sister Cynthia. She married Sir Edward Clive Milnes-Coates, 2nd Baronet.
- Lady Helen Cynthia Crewe-Milnes, Mrs Colville, DBE (1884–1968). Twin with her sister, Celia. She married the Hon. George Charles Colville (1867–1943) and was mother of Sir John Colville who served as a Private Secretary to Neville Chamberlain, Winston Churchill and Clement Attlee.

In 1899, more than a decade after his first wife's death, the 41-year-old Crewe married again. At eighteen years of age, the bride was around the same age as Crewe's eldest daughter. She was Lady Margaret Etrenne Hannah Primrose, daughter of the 5th Earl of Rosebery. As Lady Crewe, she became one of the first seven women appointed as magistrates in 1919 following the passing of the Sex Disqualification (Removal) Act 1919. They had two children, a son and a daughter, and again the son died in childhood. The children were:

- Richard George Archibald John Lucian Hungerford Crewe-Milnes, Earl of Madeley (1911–1922),
- Lady Mary Evelyn Hungerford Crewe-Milnes (1915–2014), first wife of the 9th Duke of Roxburghe.

== Notes ==
Political offices
Preceded by Lawrence Dundas, 3rd Earl of Zetland	Lord Lieutenant of Ireland; 1892–1895	Succeeded by George Cadogan, 5th Earl Cadogan
Preceded by Charles Vane-Tempest-Stewart, 6th Marquess of Londonderry	Lord President of the Council; 1905–1908	Succeeded by Edward Marjoribanks, 2nd Baron Tweedmouth
Preceded by Victor Bruce, 9th Earl of Elgin	Colonial Secretary; 1908–1910	Succeeded by Lewis Vernon Harcourt
Preceded by George Robinson, 1st Marquess of Ripon	Lord Privy Seal; 1908–1911	Succeeded by Charles Wynn-Carington, 1st Earl Carrington
Preceded by George Robinson, 1st Marquess of Ripon	Leader of the House of Lords; 1908–1916	Succeeded by George Nathaniel Curzon,1st Earl Curzon of Kedleston
Preceded by John Morley, 1st Viscount Morley of Blackburn	Secretary of State for India; 1910–1915	Succeeded by Austen Chamberlain
Preceded by Charles Wynn-Carington, 1st Marquess of Lincolnshire	Lord Privy Seal; 1912–1915	Succeeded by George Nathaniel Curzon,1st Earl Curzon of Kedleston
Preceded by William Lygon, 7th Earl Beauchamp	Lord President of the Council; 1915–1916	Succeeded by George Nathaniel Curzon,1st Earl Curzon of Kedleston
Preceded by Arthur Henderson	President of the Board of Education; 1916	Succeeded by Herbert Fisher
Preceded by Alfred Fowell Buxton	Chairman of the London County Council; 1917–1918	Succeeded by Ronald Collet Norman
Preceded by Thomas Shaw	Secretary of State for War; 1931	Succeeded by Douglas Hogg, 1st Viscount Hailsham
Party political offices
Preceded by George Robinson, 1st Marquess of Ripon	Leader of the Liberals in the House of Lords; 1908–1923	Succeeded by Edward Grey, 1st Viscount Grey of Fallodon
Preceded by Rufus Isaacs, 1st Marquess of Reading	Leader of the Liberals in the House of Lords; 1936–1944	Succeeded by Herbert Samuel, 1st Viscount Samuel
Diplomatic posts
Preceded by Charles Hardinge, 1st Baron Hardinge of Penshurst	British Ambassador to France; 1922–1928	Succeeded by Sir William Tyrrell
Academic offices
Preceded by Henry Fitzalan-Howard	Chancellor of the University of Sheffield; 1917–1944	Succeeded by Henry Lascelles
Honorary titles
Preceded by Alexander Duff, 1st Duke of Fife	Lord Lieutenant of the County of London; 1912–1944	Succeeded by Gerald Wellesley, 7th Duke of Wellington
Preceded by William Cavendish-Bentinck, 6th Duke of Portland	Senior Privy Counsellor; 1943–1945	Succeeded by James Lowther, 1st Viscount Ullswater
Peerage of the United Kingdom
New creation	Marquess of Crewe; 1911–1945	Extinct
New creation	Earl of Crewe; 1895–1945	Extinct
Preceded by Richard Monckton Milnes	Baron Houghton; 1885–1945	Extinct
