= Sheepleas =

Protected area in Surrey, England

Coordinates: 51.253°N 0.441°W

- Site of Special Scientific Interest
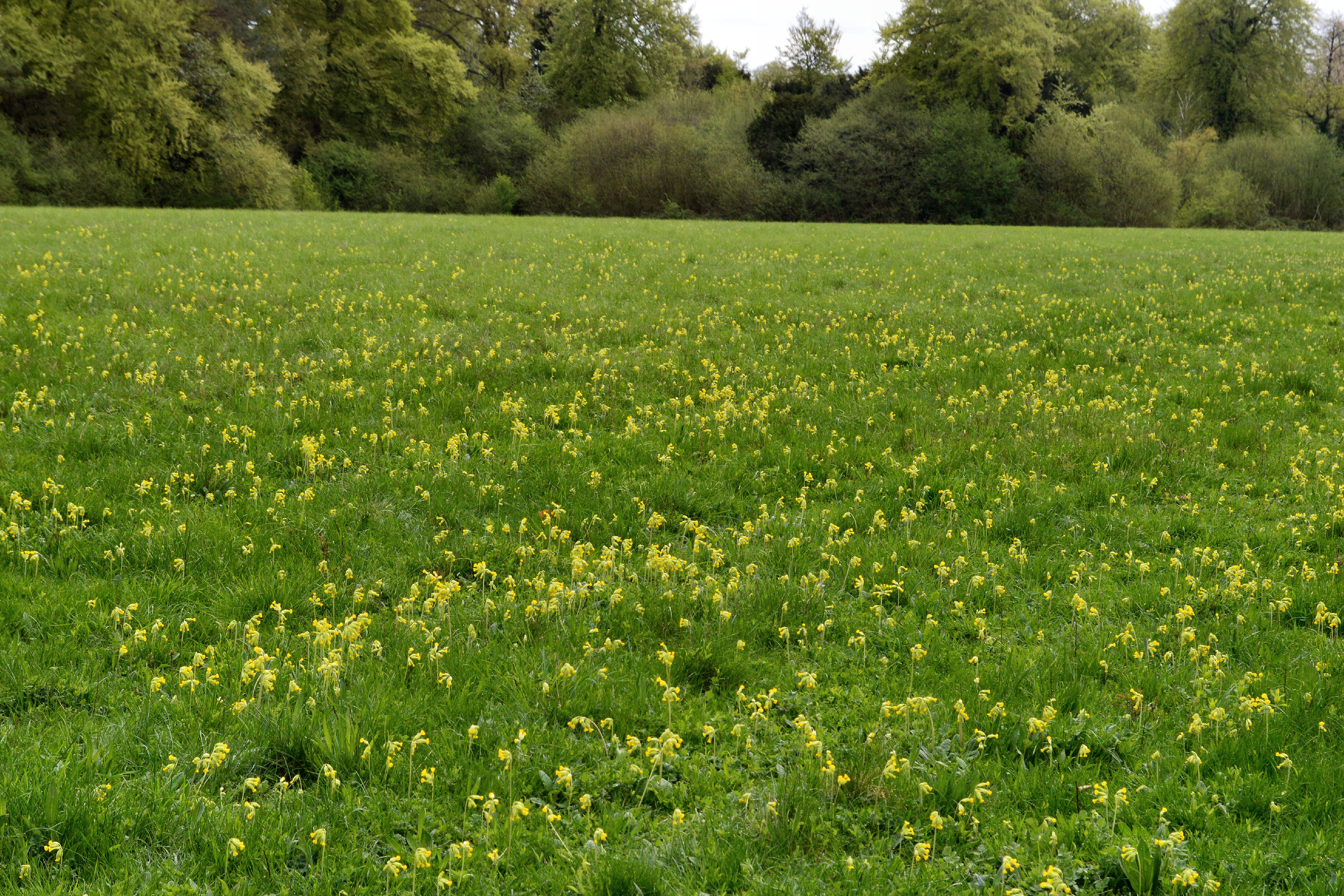
- Cowslip Meadow
- Location of Sheepleas.
- Area of search: Surrey
- Grid reference: TQ 089 516
- Interest: Biological; Geological
- Area: 99.9 hectares (247 acres)
- Notification date: 1986
- Location map: Magic Map

Sheepleas is a 99.9-hectare (247-acre) biological and geological Site of Special Scientific Interest east of Guildford in Surrey. It is a Geological Conservation Review site and a Local Nature Reserve. It is owned by Surrey County Council and managed by the Surrey Wildlife Trust.

== History ==
The sheepleas was a long-standing area sheep grazing area ('lēah' being an Old English term for pasture). In 1915, it was included as one of 284 nature reserves on the Rothschild List. Part of the sheepleas Surrey County Council bought in 1936 and a further area in the 1950s.

== Geography ==
This sloping site on the North Downs has woodland, scrub and botanically rich grassland. The diverse invertebrate fauna includes two nationally rare flies, Norellia spinipes and Microdon devius. A cutting in Mountain Wood exposes a unique gravel Pleistocene deposit which throws light on the Quaternary history of the Weald and the evolution of the London Basin.

The site is open to the public.
