= Mary Innes-Ker, Duchess of Roxburghe =

British aristocrat (1915–2014)

Mary, Duchess of Roxburghe
- Born: Lady Mary Evelyn Hungerford Crewe-Milnes; 23 March 1915
- Died: 2 July 2014 (aged 99)
- Spouse: George Innes-Ker, 9th Duke of Roxburghe (m. 1935; div. 1953)
- Parents: Robert Crewe-Milnes, 1st Marquess of Crewe (father); Margaret Crewe-Milnes (mother)
- Relatives: Bamber Gascoigne (great-nephew)

Mary Evelyn Hungerford Innes-Ker, Duchess of Roxburghe (23 March 1915 – 2 July 2014), born Lady Mary Crewe-Milnes, was a British aristocrat. She was a daughter of Robert Crewe-Milnes, 1st Marquess of Crewe, by his marriage to Lady Peggy Primrose, one of the first seven women appointed as magistrates in 1919 following the passing of the Sex Disqualification (Removal) Act 1919. Her maternal grandparents were Hannah de Rothschild and Archibald Primrose, 5th Earl of Rosebery.

== Marriage and divorce ==
A goddaughter of Queen Mary, she was the first wife of George Innes-Ker, 9th Duke of Roxburghe. They were married on 24 October 1935, at Westminster Abbey, but divorced in 1953. According to The Daily Telegraph, she was best known for resisting the attempts of her husband to evict her from the family home, Floors Castle.

She was a great patron of the Royal Ballet in the era of Margot Fonteyn and Frederick Ashton.

== West Horsley Place ==
In 1967 her mother, Margaret, Lady Crewe, died and left the Duchess an estate at West Horsley, Surrey, including West Horsley Place, a large country house dating from the 16th century. On her own death, this was inherited by her grandnephew Bamber Gascoigne, the grandson of her much older half-sister Lady Annabel Hungerford Crewe-Milnes.

== Death ==
The Duchess of Roxburghe died aged 99 on 2 July 2014 after a long illness.

== Bequests ==
In her will, the Duchess also bequeathed her family's collection of over 7,500 books, including major and hitherto unknown works of English and French literature, to the library of Trinity College, Cambridge, where both her father and grandfather had studied. Among the books was discovered a first edition of The Faerie Queene, which had been inscribed by Charles I during his imprisonment.
