= Edmond de Rothschild Heritage =

French company

- Industry: Wine, Hospitality, Restaurants
- Predecessor: Société Française des Hôtels de Montagne
- Founded: 1920
- Founder: Baroness Noémie de Rothschild
- Headquarters: Paris, France
- Key people: Alexis de la Palme (Chairman of the Board)
- Revenue: €356.5 millions (2024)
- Owner: Edmond de Rothschild Group
- Website: edmondderothschildheritage.com

The brand Edmond de Rothschild Heritage combines the non-banking lifestyle assets (wine, hotels, restaurants, farming) of the Edmond de Rothschild Group.

The brand's origins date back to the creation in 1920 of the Société Française des Hôtels de Montagne (SFHM) by Baroness Noémie de Rothschild to develop a ski station in Megève (French Alps). The SFHM branched into winemaking, hospitality, food service and production starting in the 1970s, a portfolio of lifestyle assets that were combined in the brand Edmond de Rothschild Heritage in 2016. Alexis de La Palme has been Chairman of the Board since 2015.

== History ==
After World War I, Noémie de Rothschild (1888-1968) sent her ski instructor Trygve Smith to find a ski spot in the French Alps to compete with St. Moritz (Switzerland). Due to its slope meadows, views of the Mont Blanc, and easy access from Geneva, he recommended Megève. Noémie de Rothschild and her husband Baron Maurice de Rothschild (1881-1957) founded the Société Française des Hôtels de Montagne (SFHM) and built the "Palace des Neiges" hotel in Megève. King Albert I of Belgium was among the first visitors of the resort. In 1926, Noémie de Rothschild commissioned the architect Henry Jacques Le Même to build her private chalet in Megève. He designed the Chalet du Mont d'Arbois, the first snow-mountain chalet of modern times.

In 1963, Baron Edmond de Rothschild (1926-1997), son of Noémie de Rothschild, took over the management of the family properties in Megève. He bought the neighboring chalets and transformed the Chalet du Mont d'Arbois into a hotel.

The Rothschild family has been associated with wines since Nathaniel de Rothschild acquired the Château Mouton in 1853 and James Mayer de Rothschild acquired the Château Lafite in 1868. In 1973, Edmond de Rothschild purchased the winery Château Clarke (and Château Malmaison) in the Médoc in France and renovated it, releasing the domain's first bottle in 1978. In 1990, Edmond de Rothschild launched a cheese-production farm in his family estate in France (Ferme des Trente Arpents) to produce the cheese AOC Brie de Meaux. In 1997, the company acquired the Friedrickburg Estate in Franschhoek (South Africa) with the Rupert family to create the Rupert & Rothschild Vignerons vineyard.

In 1998, following the passing of Edmond de Rothschild, his son Benjamin de Rothschild (1963-2021) and his wife Ariane de Rothschild took over the management of the SFHM. The same year, along with other investors (including Laurent Dassault), they founded the Clos de los Siete in the Uco Valley (Argentina) to produce the wine Flechas de los Andes. They then acquired the Château des Laurets and Château de Malengin in Saint-Émilion (France) in 2003, and participated in the creation of the Champagne Barons de Rothschild in association with other members of the Rothschild family. In 2012, 24 hectares of Marlborough Vineyards (New Zealand) were purchased to produce the Rimapere wine.

In 2016, the brand Edmond de Rothschild Heritage was created to combine all the lifestyle assets of the Edmond de Rothschild Group developed since the foundation of the SFHM in 1920. In 2018, Edmond de Rothschild Heritage inaugurated a 5-star ski hotel and resort in Megève branded Four Seasons. The company expanded in Spain with the launch, along with Vega Sicilia, of the winery Bodegas Benjamin de Rothschild & Vega Sicilia - Macán in La Rioja in 2017 and the opening of the hotel Palacio de Samaniego in Rioja Alavesa in 2021. In 2022, Heritage bought the New Zealand winery Akarua in the Central Otago wine region.

== Description ==
Edmond de Rothschild Heritage combines the non-banking lifestyle assets owned by the Edmond de Rothschild Group, including wine, hospitality, restaurants and farming. The wineries owned by Edmond de Rothschild Heritage produce 3.5 million bottles of wine every year. Edmond de Rothschild Heritage owns 250 Holstein cows for the production of Brie de Meaux Fermier AOC in Seine-et-Marne, France, and produces honey, terrine, jam and other farm products.

Assets
Industry	Name	Location	Note
Wine	Château Clarke	Listrac-Médoc (Bordeaux, France)	
Wine	Château Malmaison	Moulis-en-Médoc (Bordeaux, France)	
Wine	Château de Malengin	Montagne Saint-Émilion (Bordeaux, France)	
Wine	Rupert & Rothschild Vignerons	Franschhoek Valley (South Africa)	Partner: Rupert family
Wine	Château des Laurets	Puisseguin Saint-Émilion (Bordeaux, France)	
Wine	Flechas de los Andes	Vista Flores (Mendoza, Argentina)	Partner: Laurent Dassault
Wine	Rimapere	Rapaura Road (New Zealand)	
Wine	Akarua	Central Otago (New Zealand)	
Wine	Macán	La Rioja (Spain)	Partner: Vega Sicilia
Hotel	Megève Four Seasons	Megève (France)	
Hotel	Les Chalets du Mont d'Arbois	Megève (France)	
Hotel	La Ferme du Golf	Megève (France)	
Hotel	Palacio de Samaniego	Rioja Alavesa (Spain)	
Food service	La Dame de Pic - Le 1920	Megève (France)	
Food service	Le Club du Mont'd'Arbois	Megève (France)	
Food service	Tierra y Vino	Rioja Alavesa (Spain)	
Cheese	Ferme des Trente Arpents	Favières-en-Brie (France)	Brie de Meaux Fermier AOC
Stores	Épicerie Noémie	Megève (France)	Delicatessen
Stores	Cellier des 30 Arpents	Favières (France)	Farm products

== See also ==
- Edmond de Rothschild Group
- Edmond de Rothschild Foundations
