= Edmond de Rothschild Group =

Swiss financial services company

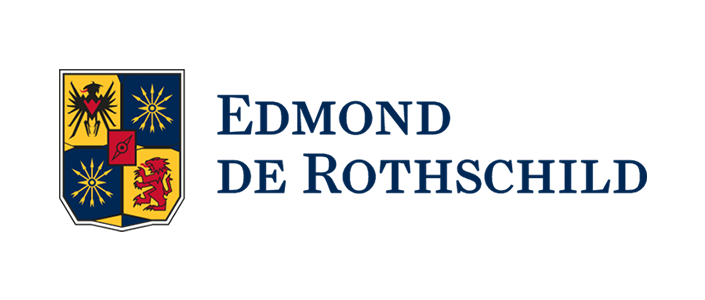
- Formerly: Compagnie Financière Edmond de Rothschild
- Industry: Financial services
- Founded: 1953; 73 years ago
- Founder: Edmond de Rothschild
- Headquarters: Geneva, Switzerland
- Area served: Worldwide
- Key people: Yves Perrier (Chairman); Ariane de Rothschild (CEO); Cynthia Tobiano (Deputy CEO)
- Revenue: 6.3 billion CHF (2024)
- Operating income: 243 million CHF (2024)
- AUM: ▲184 billion CHF (2024)
- Number of employees: 2,700 (2024)
- Website: Edmond-de-rothschild.com

The Edmond de Rothschild Group is a financial institution specialized in private banking and asset management. Based in Geneva, the group is family-owned and independent, and encompasses the Edmond de Rothschild Foundations (philanthropic arm), the lifestyle brand Edmond de Rothschild Heritage (fine wine and cheese, luxury hotels and restaurants), and sponsors the Gitana Team (professional sailing team).

The group was founded in Paris in 1953 by Edmond de Rothschild as La Compagnie Financière (LCF) Edmond de Rothschild. After opening branches in Geneva and Luxembourg, the LCF launched the first fund of funds in 1969. In 1997, Benjamin and Ariane de Rothschild took over the governance of the company, which was reorganized and renamed Edmond de Rothschild Group in 2010.

In 2024, the business managed assets of CHF 184 billion, had 2,700 employees, and had 29 sites across 14 countries. Ariane de Rothschild has been CEO of the group and Cynthia Tobiano Deputy CEO since March 2023.

== History ==
=== 1953–1997: Edmond de Rothschild era ===
In 1953, Edmond de Rothschild founded La Compagnie Financière (LCF) Edmond de Rothschild in Paris. He launched the Geneva-based private banking practice Banque Privée Edmond de Rothschild in 1965 and the branch in Luxembourg three years later.

In 1969, LCF Edmond de Rothschild introduced a new investment model, the fund of funds (FOF) management. In 1970, LCF Edmond de Rothschild was delivered a French banking licence. In 1973, LCF Edmond de Rothschild bought the Bank of California, and sold it back to the Mitsubishi Bank in 1985 for thrice its acquisition price. In 1973, Edmond de Rothschild purchased the vineyard Château Clarke, appellation Listrac-Médoc, the first wine of the Edmond de Rothschild Heritage collection. In 1982, when David de Rothschild launched Paris-Orléans Gestion (Rothschild & Co), LCF Edmond de Rothschild took a 10% stake in the new structure.

In 1989, Benjamin de Rothschild, son of Edmond de Rothschild, founded the Compagnie de Trésorerie to offer advanced financial risk management services. In 1992, LCF Edmond de Rothschild managed assets worth $2 billion, and opened an office in Hong Kong.

=== 1997–2021: Benjamin and Ariane de Rothschild era ===
Following the death of his father in 1997, Benjamin de Rothschild became the president of La Compagnie Financière Edmond de Rothschild. In 1999, in Canada, in association with the Banque Laurentienne, LCF created the financial company BLC—Edmond de Rothschild Gestion d'Actifs Inc., which eventually led to the creation of B2B Banque. In 2001, LCF launched its first online banking website. In 2002, LCF launched the private equity structure Capital Partners. In 2005, Benjamin and Ariane de Rothschild launched the Edmond de Rothschild Foundations to unify and optimize the group's philanthropic operations. In 2006, LCF and Nikko Cordial Securities launched LCF Edmond de Rothschild Nikko Cordial, the first fully-fledged family office in Japan. In March 2008, LCF Edmond de Rothschild became the first foreign bank in China to own a share of a Chinese mutual fund manager when it bought 15% of Zhonghai Fund Management, and increased its participation to 25% in 2011. From 2000 to 2010, LCF Edmond de Rothschild opened 7 regional offices in France.

In 2009, Ariane de Rothschild became the vice-president of LCF Edmond-de-Rothschild. In 2010, La Compagnie Financière Edmond de Rothschild (LCF) changed its name to Edmond de Rothschild Group. In 2011, the group joined the UNEP FI program. In 2011, the group opened an office in Dubai to develop its activities in the Middle East and became a member of the United Nations Global Compact. In 2013, it announced its plan to open a new office in London. In 2014, after raising a $530 million fund targeting investments in Africa, all of the company's financial and non-financial assets were reorganized within the group's structure.

In 2015, Ariane de Rothschild was named CEO of the Edmond de Rothschild Group. She was the first woman to run a Rothschild-branded financial institution, and was nominated to give the company a new impetus. The group published a sustainability report for the first time and launched the Fund Big Data. Under the Swiss Bank Program, the group signed a non-prosecution agreement with the US Department of Justice regarding undeclared US accounts in Switzerland and paid a $45.24 million penalty. In 2016, the Société française des hôtels de montagne (SFHM) which gathered the non-financial assets of the group became Edmond de Rothschild Heritage. In 2017, the group was fined $10.1 million in the aftermath of the 1MDB affair. In 2018, the group raised a €345 million fund to invest in biotech and medical devices. In March 2019, the company removed Edmond de Rothschild (Switzerland) S.A. from public trading, making it 100% private. Ariane de Rothschild took chairmanship of the board, and Vincent Taupin became CEO. The French business entities were folded into the Swiss holding company to simplify the group's organization.

In 2019, the Edmond de Rothschild Group launched an AI-powered fund to invest in the real estate market and raised €375 million for its fourth Africa-focused fund. The company's shares were delisted from the Zurich stock exchange on 22 October 2019. In 2020, the group made its first investment in the Baltics by investing in the parking lot operator Parkdema and Sergey Bogdanchikov filed a lawsuit against the group for fraud.

=== Since 2021: Ariane de Rothschild era ===
In January 2021, Benjamin de Rothschild died of a heart attack. Ariane de Rothschild became the sole majority owner of the Edmond de Rothschild Group, holding the majority of the votes with her four daughters, and maintained the roadmap of the group's transformation initiated with her husband.

In 2021, the group launched a $250-million foodtech fund with PeakBridge VC and the Fund-Human Capital focused on companies with the best employee management practices. Yves Perrier joined the company's board and François Pauly replaced Vincent Taupin as CEO of the group. Edmond de Rothschild partnered with the UK-based wealth management firm Hottinger Group and acquired a 42.5% stake in the latter. In March 2023, Ariane de Rothschild became CEO of the group.

The bank was raided on 20 March 2026 in Paris as part of a financial investigation linked to the Epstein cases. The investigation notably targeted one of its former employees, the French diplomat Fabrice Aidan.

== Description ==
The Edmond de Rothschild Group is a conviction-driven investment house. In 2024, the group had 2,700 employees, 28 offices in 14 countries and 3 international management centers (Geneva, Luxembourg, Paris). The group managed CHF 184 billion worth of assets and recorded a solvency ratio of 19.7%. The Edmond de Rothschild Group provides the following services:

- Private banking
- Asset management
- Real estate
- Private equity
- Corporate finance
- Funds management

== Other activities ==
- Edmond de Rothschild Heritage: The lifestyle assets managed by the Edmond de Rothschild Group are gathered under the label Edmond de Rothschild Heritage. Those assets include wines (Château Clarke, Château des Laurets, Château Malmaison, Flechas de los Andes, Rimapere, Rupert and Rothschild Vignerons, Macán, Champagne Barons de Rothschild, a majority stake in Château Lafite Rothschild), restaurants (1920, Kaïto, L'Auberge de la Cote 2000), hotels (Châlet du Mont d'Arbois, Four Seasons Hotel Megève, La Ferme du Golf) and gourmet foods production (Brie de Meaux, Coulommiers, Merle Rouge, honey, olive oil, terrine, jam).
- Edmond de Rothschild Foundations: Following the philanthropic tradition of the Rothschild family, the Edmond de Rothschild Foundations is an international network of 10 foundations active in the fields of art and culture, health and research, philanthropy, cultural dialogue and social entrepreneurship.
- Gitana Team: Professional sailing team created by Benjamin de Rothschild in 2001

== Controversies ==
=== Jeffrey Epstein ===
In February 2026, media reports based on documents released by the United States Department of Justice said Ariane de Rothschild maintained contact with financier Jeffrey Epstein between 2013 and 2019 and that Epstein provided advisory services connected to the Edmond de Rothschild Group during a period of U.S. scrutiny of Swiss banking practices. The reports said the group agreed to pay Epstein's firm US$25 million for consulting and related services connected to introductions and strategic advice.

In March 2026, French financial prosecutors announced that the Paris arm of the Edmond de Rothschild Group was among several locations which were searched in connection to the Epstein investigation.

== Governance ==
=== Presidents ===
- 1953–1997: Edmond de Rothschild
- 1997–2019: Benjamin de Rothschild
- 2019–present: Ariane de Rothschild

=== Executive committee ===
- Ariane de Rothschild (CEO)
- Cynthia Tobiano (Deputy CEO)
- Benoit Barbereau (Chief Operating Officer)
- Christophe Caspar (Head of Asset Management)
- Philippe Cieutat (Chief Financial Officer)
- Pierre-Étienne Durand (Head of Strategy)
- Diego Gaspari (Head of Human Resources)
- Hervé Ordioni (Head of Private Banking)
- Jean-Christophe Pernollet (Chief Risk / Legal / Compliance Officer)

== See also ==
- Edmond Adolphe de Rothschild
- Benjamin de Rothschild
- Ariane de Rothschild
- Rothschild family
- Banking in Switzerland
