= Domaine du Mont d'Arbois =

Luxury hotel on Mont d'Arbois in Haute-Sevoie, France

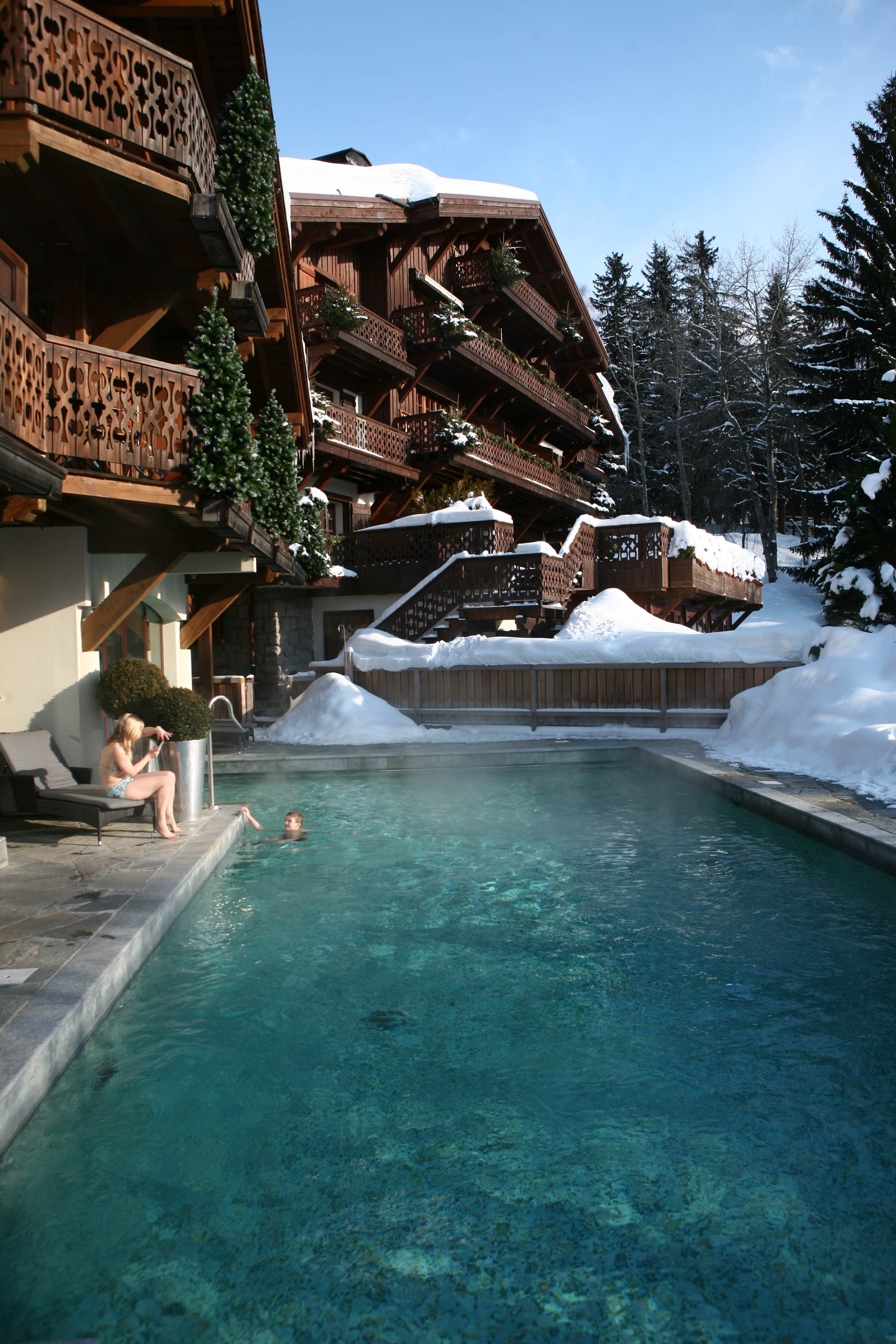
- Interactive map of the Domaine du Mont d'Arbois area

General information
- Location: Mont d'Arbois, France
- Coordinates: 45.856°N 6.628°E
- Opening: 1924; 1979
- Owner: Benjamin de Rothschild
- Operator: Relais & Châteaux

Design and construction
- Architect: Henry Jacques Le Même
- Developer: Noémie de Rothschild

Other information
- Number of rooms: 51
- Number of restaurants: 1

Website
- mont-darbois.fr

The Domaine du Mont d'Arbois is a historic luxury hotel in Mont d'Arbois near Megève, Haute-Savoie, France. Established as a private chalet by the Rothschild family in the 1920s, it became a hotel in 1979.

== History ==
The Domaine du Mont d'Arbois was established as a private chalet for family and friends by Noémie de Rothschild, the wife of Maurice de Rothschild, on January 13, 1924. Baroness de Rothschild initially wanted to avoid wintering alongside the German aristocracy in St. Moritz, Switzerland, due to hostility from World War I. She purchased the old chalet, and hired architect Henry Jacques Le Même to design a second chalet.

The chalets were inherited by Baron Edmond Adolphe de Rothschild, who purchased a third chalet and renovated it in 1963–1964. He turned it into a hotel open to the public in 1979. It is operated by Relais & Châteaux. The hotel has 51 bedrooms, a restaurant, Le 1920, as well as a spa and heated outdoor swimming-pool. It was owned by Benjamin de Rothschild, until his death in 2021.

== See also ==
- Edmond de Rothschild Heritage
