= Benjamin de Rothschild =

French banker (1963–2021)

- Born: Benjamin Edmond Maurice Adolphe Henri Isaac de Rothschild; 30 July 1963; Neuilly-sur-Seine, France
- Died: 15 January 2021 (aged 57); Pregny-Chambésy, Switzerland
- Education: Pepperdine University
- Occupation: Banker
- Spouse: Ariane Langner (m. 1999)
- Children: 4
- Parent(s): Edmond Adolphe de Rothschild (1926–1997); Nadine Lhopitalier (b. 1932)

Benjamin de Rothschild (30 July 1963 – 15 January 2021) was a French banker, the owner of the Edmond de Rothschild Group from 1997 until his death in 2021. He was the son of Edmond Adolphe and Nadine de Rothschild. He was married to Ariane de Rothschild. In 2001, he created the professional offshore sailing racing team Gitana Team.

In 2021, Forbes estimated his fortune was worth $1.4 billion.

== Family ==
Benjamin de Rothschild was a seventh-generation descendant of the dynasty founder Mayer Amschel. He was the great-grandson of Edmond James de Rothschild and Adelheid von Rothschild, the grandson of Maurice de Rothschild and Noémie Halphen, and the only child of Edmond Adolphe and Nadine (née Lhopitalier) de Rothschild. His father was from a Jewish family and his mother converted to Judaism. He was also the great-great-great-grandson of Sephardi-Jew of Portuguese descent Jacob Rodrigues Pereira, being son of Edmond Adolphe and grandson of Noémie de Rothschild.

== Early life ==
Benjamin Edmond Maurice Adolphe Henri Isaac de Rothschild was born in Neuilly-sur-Seine on 30 July 1963. He studied at the Swiss Institut Florimont and held a BA in Business Management from Pepperdine University.

== Banking ==
After his graduation, de Rothschild worked in family-owned banks in California. In 1989, he returned to Europe, worked for a while at British Petroleum in London, and then launched the Compagnie de Trésorerie Benjamin de Rothschild, specializing in advanced financial risk management.

After the death of his father in 1997, de Rothschild succeeded him as chairman of the Compagnie Financière Edmond de Rothschild. He restructured the group's organization around key activities such as asset management and mergers and acquisitions. In 1999, he launched Edmond de Rothschild Investment Services in Israel where he also succeeded his father at the helm of the Caesarea Rothschild Foundation. In 2010, Compagnie Financière Edmond de Rothschild became the Edmond de Rothschild Group.

In March 2015, de Rothschild named his wife Ariane de Rothschild CEO of the group, and chairwoman of the executive committee. In 2016, all the lifestyle-oriented assets of the group were reorganized under the Edmond de Rothschild Heritage label. In March 2019, the Benjamin de Rothschild family made the Edmond de Rothschild Group 100% privately owned. The group's French bank was consolidated within the Swiss bank which subsequently became the group's main holding structure. Ariane de Rothschild became chairman of the new group.

== Sailing ==
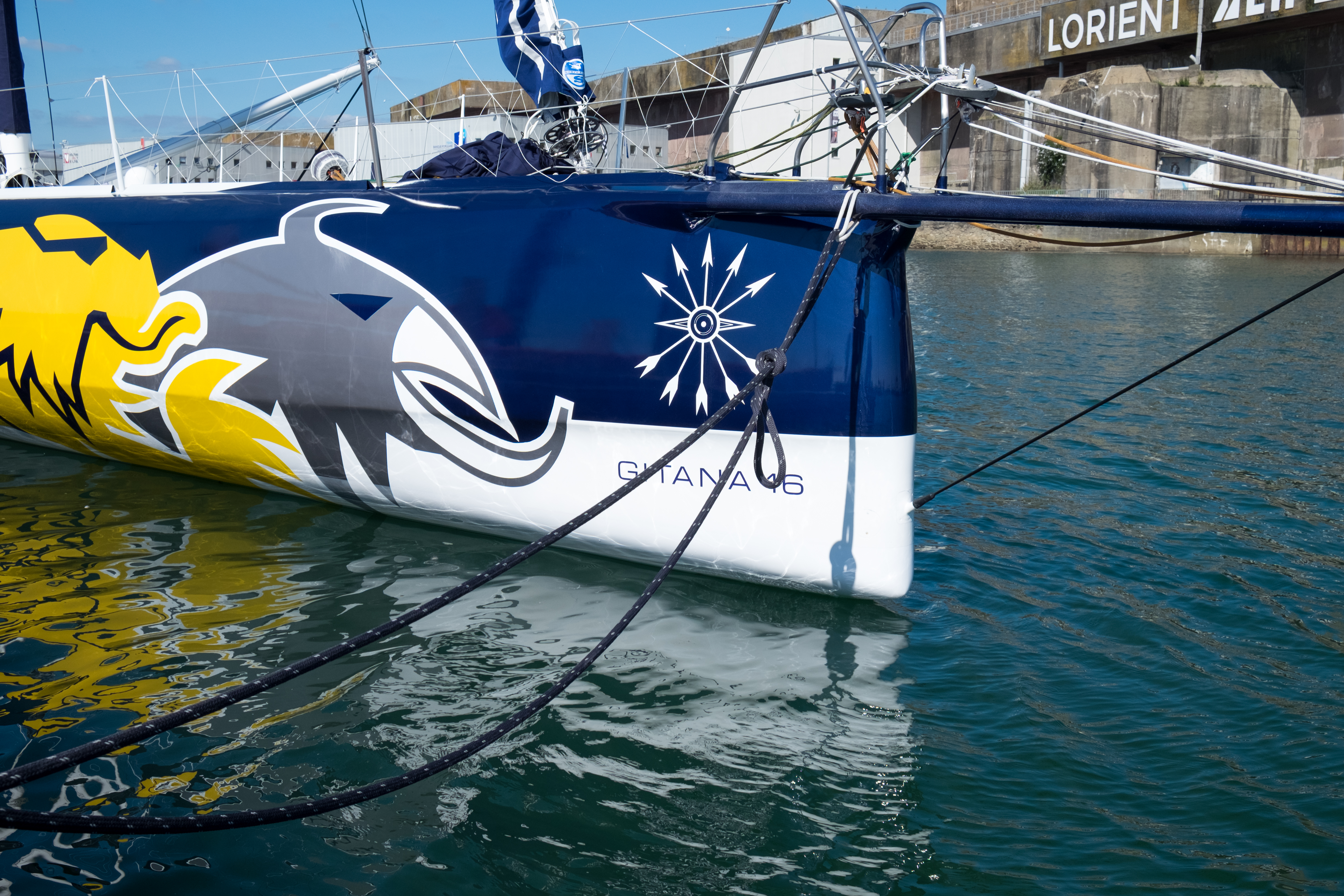
Bow of Gitana 16

In 2000, Benjamin de Rothschild purchased the 62-foot (19 m) Elf Aquitaine and founded the professional sailing team Gitana Team, walking in the footsteps of his family's traditions, but eventually expanding it to multihull sailboats. The team's first trimaran was the Gitana IX (former Elf Aquitaine), followed by the Gitana X, entirely developed by the team. The Gitana 11 won the Route du Rhum in 2006.

In 2015, the team mounted foiling dagger boards and T-rudders on a Multi One Design 70 ft to make it "fly" over water, after a decision a year earlier to build a new, state-of-the-art yacht. On 17 July 2017, the 32×23-meter Maxi Edmond de Rothschild (Gitana 17) was introduced, the offshore racing's first maxi-multihull designed to fly in the open ocean. It was decorated by the street artist Cleon Peterson. The Maxi won the 48th edition of the Rolex Fastnet Race in August 2019, breaking the record set in 2011 by Loïck Peyron (Banque Populaire V) and the Brest Atlantiques in December 2019 (skippers Charles Caudrelier-Franck Cammas for both races).

== Vineyards and farms ==
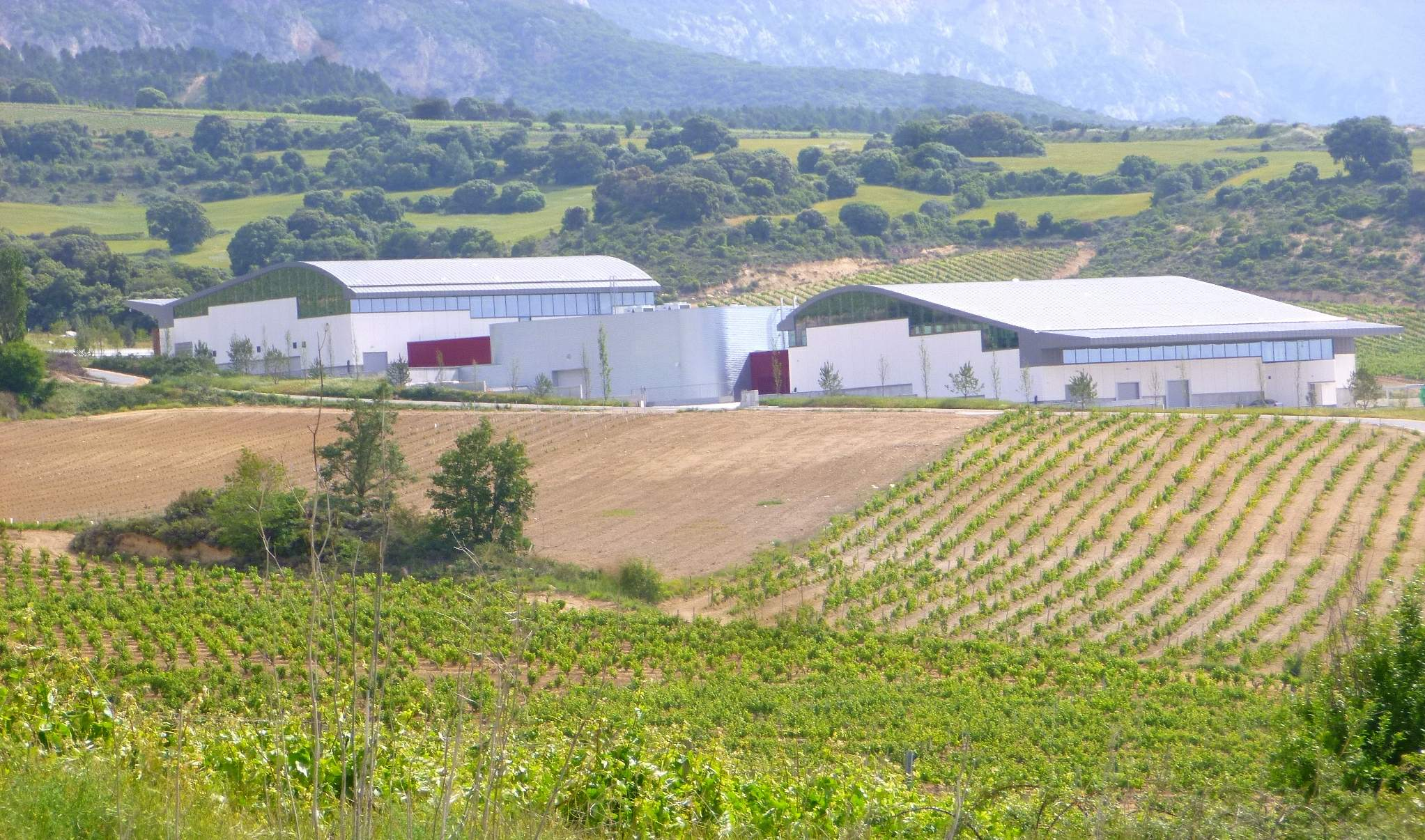
Bodegas Benjamín Rothschild-Vega Sicilia, Samaniego, Spain

Benjamin de Rothschild inherited the Château Clarke wine estate purchased by his father in 1973. He renovated the fermentation room and hired the oenologist Michel Rolland in 1998 to perfect the Château's vines and supervise the family's new vineyard ventures in South Africa and Argentina.

In 1997, Benjamin de Rothschild initiated a joint venture with Anton Rupert to create the Rupert & Rothschild Vignerons vineyards in South Africa. He gathered wine enthusiasts (including Laurent Dassault) to create the wine estate Le Clos de los Siete in Argentina's Uco Valley, producer of the Flechas de los Andes wine. In 2003, he acquired the Château des Laurets vineyards in Bordeaux. In 2005, he launched Champagne Barons de Rothschild with Baron Éric de Rothschild and Baroness Philippine de Rothschild. In 2009, he launched a joint venture with the Spanish winery Vega Sicilia. In 2012, he acquired 26 hectares (64 acres) of vines in the Marlborough Region of New Zealand to produce the Rimapere wine. Benjamin de Rothschild was the largest stakeholder in the Château Lafite Rothschild wine estate.

The baron and his wife were the owners of La Ferme des 30 Arpents in the countryside outside of Paris, which produces brie de Meaux AOC.

== Personal life ==
Benjamin de Rothschild had heroin abuse problems for many years. On 23 January 1999, Benjamin de Rothschild married Ariane Langner. They had four daughters. Ariane de Rothschild is not Jewish and did not convert to Judaism. Benjamin was an avid car collector who bought Formula 1 Ferraris from the official racing team (he was a member of the "F1 Clienti" program) and also owned a Ferrari California. He bought the engine of the crashed Concorde (Air France Flight 4590) and commissioned an artist to turn it into a work of art.

His family wealth ranked 22nd on Challenges' 2019 list of French fortunes, 43rd on Bilan's 2019 list of Swiss fortunes, and 1349th on Forbes' 2019 list of world billionaires. He was considered one of the richest members of the Rothschild family. He was the owner of a hôtel particulier on rue de l'Élysée in Paris.

== Death ==
On 15 January 2021, Benjamin de Rothschild suffered a heart attack and died at his home in Pregny-Chambésy, Switzerland. He was 57. His wife Ariane de Rothschild became the sole manager of the family business.

== See also ==
- Edmond de Rothschild Group
- Ariane de Rothschild
- Rothschild family
