= Edmond de Rothschild =

Edmond de Rothschild may refer to:

- Edmond James de Rothschild (1845–1934)
- Edmond Adolphe de Rothschild (1926–1997)
- Edmond de Rothschild Group
