= Nadine de Rothschild =

French writer and actor

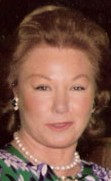
- Born: Nadine Nelly Jeannette Lhopitalier; 18 April 1932 (age 94); Saint-Quentin, France
- Other name: Nadine Tallier
- Occupations: Actress and author
- Spouse(s): Edmond Adolphe de Rothschild (m. 1963; his death 1997)
- Children: Benjamin de Rothschild (1963–2021)

Nadine de Rothschild (née Nadine Nelly Jeannette Lhopitalier; born 18 April 1932) is a French socialite and author. She is the widow of banker Edmond Adolphe de Rothschild, a member of the Rothschild family. Prior to her marriage, she had an acting career under the stage name Nadine Tallier.

== Biography ==
Nadine Lhopitalier was born in Saint-Quentin, Aisne, France. She never met her father. At 14 years-old, she left her mother's house and worked in a Peugeot factory.

2 years later, at 16, she became the model of the painter Jean-Gabriel Domergue, a socialite who opened the door for her to the worlds of theater and film. In 1952, she began her acting career under the pseudonym of Nadine Tallier and played various roles from 1952 to 1964.

In 1958, she started a romantic relationship with Lance Callingham, the son of British socialite Norah Docker.

In 1962, two years before ending her career in film, she married Edmond Adolphe de Rothschild of the French branch of the Rothschild family. At the time, Edmond was chairman and principal owner of the Edmond de Rothschild Group, a private banking group headquartered in Geneva, Switzerland. Although she was raised Roman Catholic, she converted to Judaism stating: "It would not have been possible to have the name Rothschild and be a Catholic... Nor would it be right for the son of a Rothschild to be half-Jewish and half-Catholic." They had one son born in 1963, Benjamin de Rothschild (1963–2021), shortly after their marriage. Following her husband's death in 1997, David Rockefeller proposed to her but she refused.

Lhopitalier used the noble title of her husband (Baroness), issued to the Rothschild family by the Austro-Hungarian Empire. She wrote a book about manners (Le Bonheur de Séduire l'Art de Réussir) and her autobiography (La baronne rentre à cinq heures). In addition, Lhopitalier provided some reviews in the press on the same subject. In 2004, she opened the Nadine de Rothschild International Way of Life Academy in Geneva, Switzerland.

In 2014, she held 17% of the holding's capital and 7% of the voting rights of Edmond de Rothschild Group. In disagreement with her daughter-in-law Ariane de Rothschild, she transferred her share of the family fortune to the Swiss private bank Pictet in 2014 and 2019.

In 2025, one of her lawsuit against her daughter-in-law Ariane was dismissed and she can therefore no longer access the Chateau de Pregny where she used to live with her husband until his death in 1997.

== Filmography ==
- 1949 : Un chien et madame by Marcel Martin - short (19mn) -
- 1949 : Mission in Tangier by André Hunebelle - Young woman in cabaret
- 1949 : The Sinners by Julien Duvivier - Schoolgirl
- 1950 : Quay of Grenelle by Emile-Edwin Reinert - Naked nightclub dancer
- 1951 : Darling by Richard Pottier – uncredited (body double for Martine Carol)
- 1951 : Leathernose by Yves Allégret
- 1951 : The Passage of Venus by Maurice Gleize - Gisèle
- 1951 : The Sleepwalker by Maurice Labro – Uncredited - Ginette, a salesgirl
- 1952 : The Case Against X by Richard Pottier - Amélie, the maid
- 1952 : Manina, the Girl in the Bikini by Willy Rozier - Mathilda
- 1952 : Coiffeur pour dames by Jean Boyer - Miss Mado
- 1953 : Women of Paris by Jean Boyer - Poupette
- 1953 : Children of Love by Léonide Moguy - Lulu
- 1953 : Une vie de garçon by Jean Boyer
- 1954 : Royal Affairs in Versailles by Sacha Guitry – uncredited - Court lady
- 1954 : Ma petite folie by Maurice Labro - Suzanne
- 1954 : Les hommes ne pensent qu'à ça by Yves Robert - Young woman in bathtub
- 1954 : Les Impures by Pierre Chevalier - Nightclub hostess
- 1954 : Madame du Barry by Christian-Jaque - Loque
- 1955 : Blackmail by Guy Lefranc - Janine
- 1956 : Les Truands by Carlo Rim
- 1956 : Vous pigez by Pierre Chevalier - Amanda
- 1956 : Ce soir les jupons volent by Dimitri Kirsanoff - Tania
- 1956 : Fernand cow-boy by Guy Lefranc - Any, saloon singer
- 1956 : En effeuillant la marguerite by Marc Allégret - Magali, a journalist
- 1956 : Folies-Bergère aka Un soir au music-hall by Henri Decoin - Sonia
- 1956 : Le long des trottoirs by Léonide Moguy - Pension girl
- 1956 : L'Homme et l'Enfant by Raoul André - Pitel
- 1956 : The Hunchback of Notre Dame by Jean Delannoy - Girl in the Court of Miracles
- 1957 : Cinq Millions comptant by André Berthomieu - Céleste
- 1957 : Miss Catastrophe by Dimitri Kirsanoff - Arlette
- 1957 : Donnez-moi ma chance ou Piège à filles de Léonide Moguy - Kiki
- 1957 : Comme un cheveu sur la soupe by Maurice Regamey - Juliette, nightclub hostess
- 1958 : Girls at Sea by Gilbert Gunn - Antoinette (British film)
- 1958 : En bordée by Pierre Chevalier - Muguette
- 1958 : The Possessors by Denys de La Patellière - Sylviane, young kept woman
- 1959 : Cigarettes, Whiskey and Wild Women by Maurice Regamey - Arlette
- 1959 : Rue de la peur (Los Cobardes) by Juan Carlos Thorry - Maria
- 1959 : Visa pour l'enfer by Alfred Rode - Clémentine
- 1959 : The Treasure of San Teresa (autres titres : Hot Money Girl ou Long Distance) - Larry agent secret by Alvin Rakoff - Zizi
- 1961 : Deuxième Bureau contre terroristes by Jean Stelli - Claire
- 1964 : Une ravissante idiote by Édouard Molinaro

== Theatre ==
- 1952 : Schnock opérette de Marc-Cab et Jean Rigaux, mise en scène Alfred Pasquali, Théâtre des Célestins
- 1954 : Les chansons de Bilitis opérette de Jean Valmy et Marc Cab d'après Pierre Louys, music by Joseph Kosma, Théâtre des Capucines

== Works as a writer ==
- La Baronne rentre à cinq heure (avec la collaboration de Guillemette de Sairigné), Paris : Jean-Claude Lattès, 1984. 255 p. + 16 f. de planches.
- Heureuse et pas fâchée de l'être, autobiographie, Paris : Éditions de la Seine, coll. « Succès du livre », 1987. 221 p. + 16 p. de planches (ISBN 2-7382-0007-9)
- Parlez-moi d'amour, Paris : Fixot, 1989. 243 p. + 8 p. de planches (ISBN 2-87645-051-8)
- Natara, roman, Paris : Fixot, 1994. 343 p. (ISBN 2-87645-190-5)
- Femme un jour, femme toujours (savoir-vivre), Paris : Fixot, 1997. 284 p. + 8 p. de planches (ISBN 2-221-08464-0)
- L'amour est affaire de femmes, Paris : Robert Laffont, 2001. 285 p. + 16 p. de planches (ISBN 2-221-09345-3)
- Le bonheur de séduire, l'art de réussir : le savoir-vivre du XXIe siècle, Paris : Robert Laffont, 2001. 436 p. + 8 p. de planches (ISBN 2-221-09595-2). Édition revue et augmentée d'un ouvrage paru en 1991 sous le titre « Le bonheur de séduire, l'art de réussir : savoir vivre aujourd'hui ».
- Jours heureux à Quiberon, Neuilly-sur-Seine : Michel Lafon, 2002. 160 p. (ISBN 2-84098-780-5).
- Sur les chemins de l'amour, Paris : Robert Laffont, 2003. 327 p. + 16 p. de planches (ISBN 2-221-09836-6).
- Megève, un roman d'amour, Paris : Albin Michel, 2004. 299 p. + 8 p. de planches (ISBN 2-226-15519-8).
- Les hommes de ma vie, Paris : Albin Michel, 2007 (ISBN 978-2226176134)
- Bonnes manières, 2009
- Réussir l'éducation de nos enfants, avec Arsène Bouakira, Lausanne-Paris : Favre, 2009 (ISBN 978-2828910716)
- Ma philosophie... d'un boudoir à l'autre, Paris : Albin Michel, 2010 (ISBN 978-2-226-19304-9)

== See also ==
- Rothschild family
