= Megève =

Megève Megéva (Arpitan)
- Commune
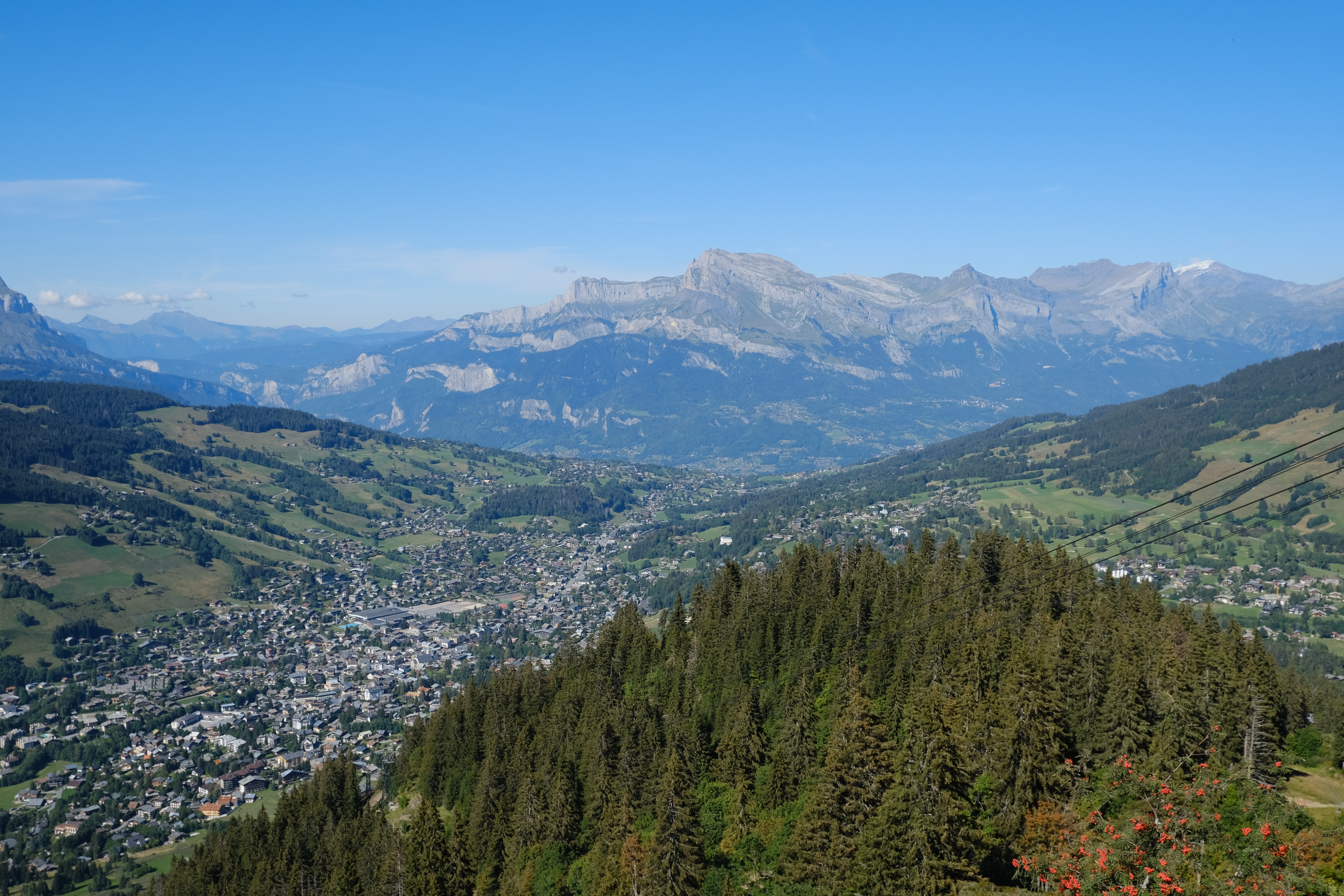
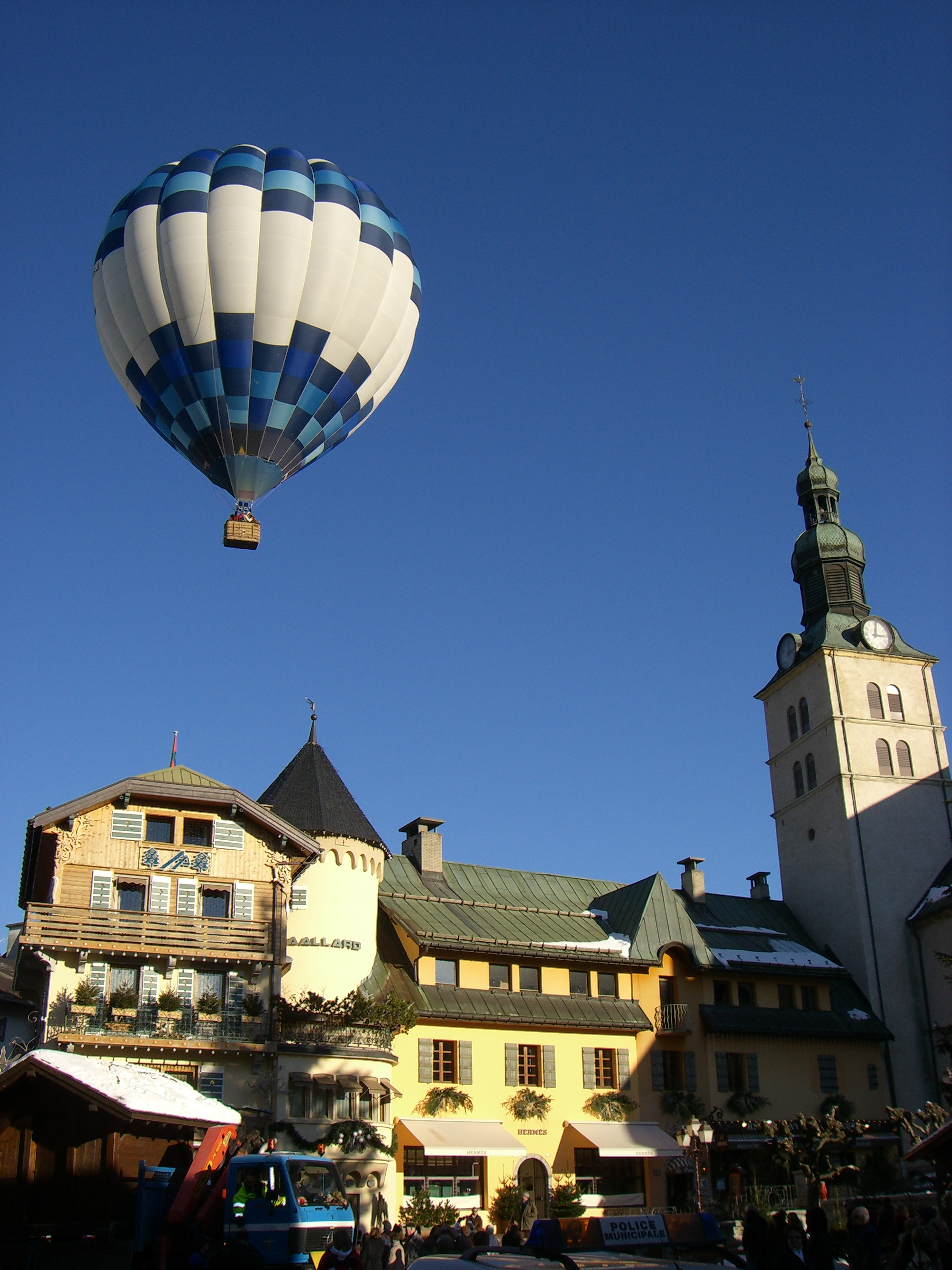
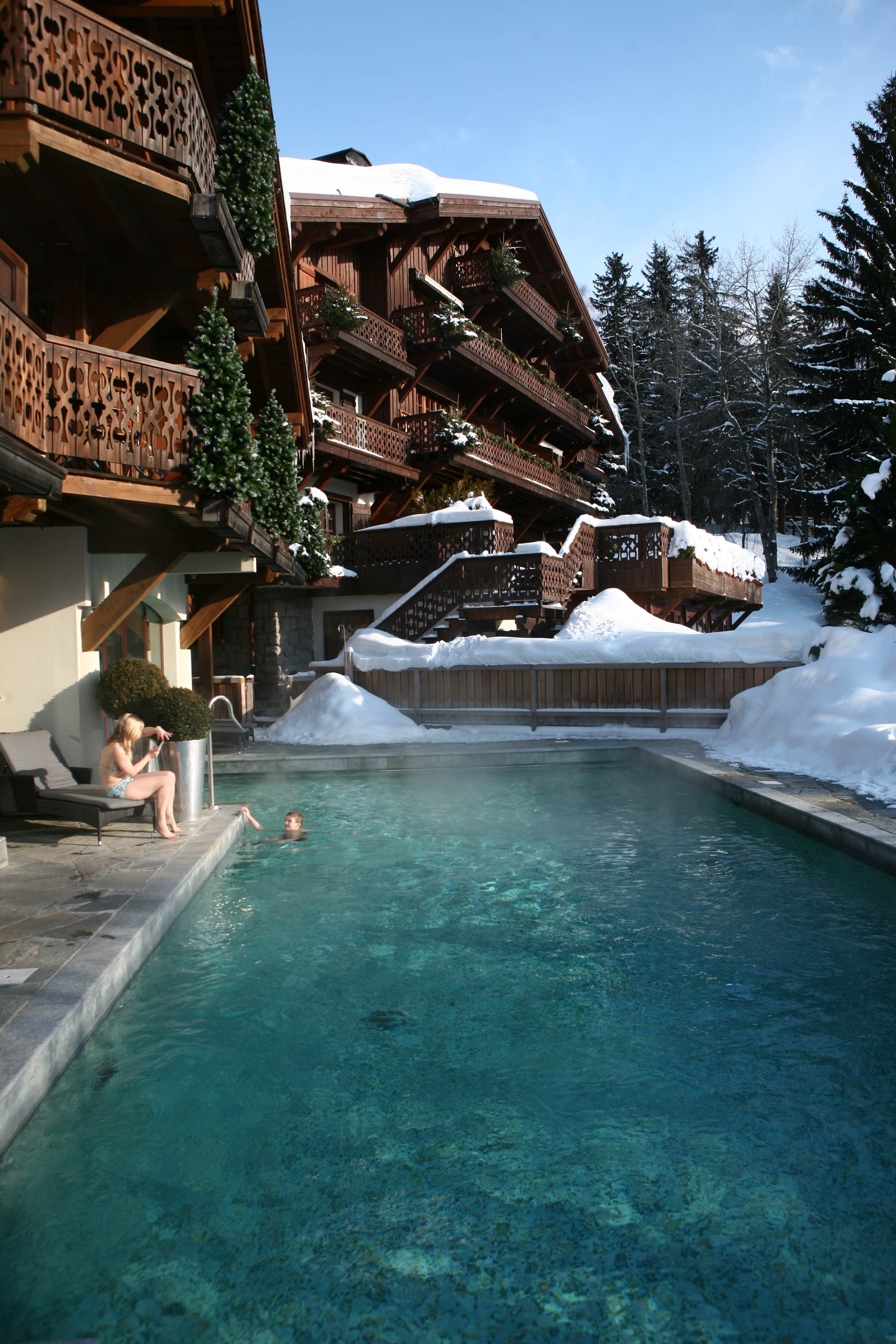
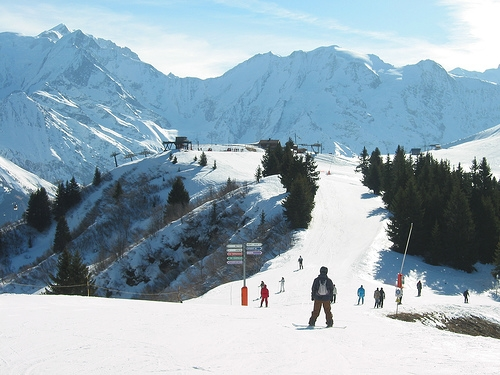
- From top to bottom, left to right: view of Megève from Rochebrune, old town with the Église Saint-Jean-Baptiste, Domaine du Mont d'Arbois on the Mont d'Arbois and ski slopes.

- Coat of arms
- Location of Megève
- Location within France Location within Auvergne-Rhône-Alpes
- Coordinates: 45°51′28″N 6°37′05″E
- Country: France
- Region: Auvergne-Rhône-Alpes
- Department: Haute-Savoie
- Arrondissement: Bonneville
- Canton: Sallanches
- Intercommunality: Pays du Mont-Blanc

Government
  - Mayor (2020–2026): Catherine Jullien-Brèches
- Area^{1}: 44.11 km^{2} (17.03 sq mi)
- Elevation: 1,113 m (3,652 ft)
- Highest elevation: 2,485 m (8,153 ft)
- Lowest elevation: 1,027 m (3,369 ft)
- Population (2023): 2,893
  - Density: 65.59/km^{2} (169.9/sq mi)
- Time zone: UTC+01:00 (CET)
  - Summer (DST): UTC+02:00 (CEST)
- INSEE/Postal code: 74173 /74120
- ^{1} French Land Register data, which excludes lakes, ponds, glaciers > 1 km^{2} (0.386 sq mi or 247 acres) and river estuaries.

Megève (French pronunciation: [məʒɛv]; Arpitan: Megéva) is a commune in the Haute-Savoie department in the Auvergne-Rhône-Alpes region in Southeastern France with a population of about 2,900 residents. The town is well known as a ski resort near Mont Blanc in the French Alps. Conceived in the 1920s as a French alternative to St. Moritz by the Rothschilds, it was the first purpose-built resort in the Alps. Originally it was a prime destination for the French elite; it remains one of the most famous and affluent ski resorts in the world.

== History ==
The town started its development as a ski resort in the 1910s, when the Rothschild family began spending their winter vacations there after becoming disenchanted with the Swiss resort St. Moritz. In 1921, Baroness Noémie de Rothschild (1888–1968) opened the Domaine du Mont d'Arbois, a luxury hotel which boosted the resort's development. By the 1950s Megève was one of the most popular ski resorts in Europe and attracted many wealthy individuals and celebrities. In the 21st century, it is still visited largely by affluent people as is evidenced by 2008 real estate prices.

== Recent development ==
For the 2014–2015 winter season in the neighbouring resort of Saint Gervais Mont Blanc, a six-seater chair was installed to replace the previous 4 seater, whilst the old 2 place Mont Joux chair still runs from Megeve to the Mont Joux area in the peak season. Further additions include the latest branch of Folie Douce in Saint Gervais at the top of Mont Joux, introducing the chain's trademark Austrian-style afternoon party scene, which opened in the 2014–2015 season. This will be the fifth venue in the Folie Douce chain, which started in Val d'Isère and then spread to Val Thorens, Méribel and Alpe d'Huez.

== Sports ==
=== Winter sports ===
Megève's Alpine skiing area, known as the "Domaine Évasion Mont Blanc", comprises Megève itself (Mont d'Arbois, L'Alpette, Rochebrune and Côte 2000); Saint-Gervais-les-Bains; Combloux; La Giettaz; Les Contamines-Montjoie and Saint-Nicolas-de-Véroce. The "Evasion Mont-Blanc" range covers approximately 445 km of the ski slopes.

On an area of 8 km^{2} (3.1 sq mi) there are 116 lifts providing access to 219 slopes totaling 445 km (277 mi).

- The 445 km of slopes are thus divided from hardest to easiest: 35 km (22 mi) blacks, 58 km (36 mi) reds, 110 km (68 mi) blues and 76 km (47 mi) greens. (See ski trail rating)
- The lifts: 67 platter lifts, 35 chairlifts and 13 gondola lifts and one cable car.

In addition, the "Domaine Évasion Mont Blanc" includes 18 cross-country skiing trails totaling 65 km (40 mi).

The first three World Junior Figure Skating Championships were held in Megève in 1976, 1977 and 1978.

The Megève Polo Masters is an international polo tournament played on snow. The Snow Golf Cup is a unique golf tournament held on snow on Megève's Mont d'Arbois plateau.

As well as these winter sports, Megève also hosts winter events including an international curling tournament, a ski cross World Cup and a mogul skiing cup. There is also night skiing in February, a ski cross slope, an open-air ice rink, snowshoeing and dog sledding plus 38 km (24 mi) of Nordic skiing in the region.

=== Summer sports ===
Megève is also a popular summer holiday destination and is especially renowned for its golfing opportunities. It was the finishing town for stage 18 and the start town for stage 20 of the 2016 Tour de France.

== Climate ==
Climate data for Megève, 1080m (1991−2020 normals, extremes 1951−present)
Month	Jan	Feb	Mar	Apr	May	Jun	Jul	Aug	Sep	Oct	Nov	Dec	Year
Record high °C (°F)	15.0 (59.0)	18.4 (65.1)	21.7 (71.1)	26.4 (79.5)	29.9 (85.8)	34.0 (93.2)	34.0 (93.2)	34.5 (94.1)	29.0 (84.2)	25.3 (77.5)	21.8 (71.2)	16.0 (60.8)	34.5 (94.1)
Mean daily maximum °C (°F)	3.2 (37.8)	4.5 (40.1)	8.8 (47.8)	12.8 (55.0)	17.0 (62.6)	21.0 (69.8)	23.1 (73.6)	22.7 (72.9)	18.1 (64.6)	13.8 (56.8)	7.7 (45.9)	3.6 (38.5)	13.0 (55.4)
Daily mean °C (°F)	−1.1 (30.0)	−0.3 (31.5)	3.5 (38.3)	7.0 (44.6)	11.2 (52.2)	14.8 (58.6)	16.7 (62.1)	16.4 (61.5)	12.5 (54.5)	8.6 (47.5)	3.4 (38.1)	−0.3 (31.5)	7.7 (45.9)
Mean daily minimum °C (°F)	−5.4 (22.3)	−5.2 (22.6)	−1.9 (28.6)	1.2 (34.2)	5.3 (41.5)	8.6 (47.5)	10.3 (50.5)	10.1 (50.2)	6.9 (44.4)	3.4 (38.1)	−1.0 (30.2)	−4.3 (24.3)	2.3 (36.2)
Record low °C (°F)	−27.0 (−16.6)	−30.6 (−23.1)	−22.0 (−7.6)	−15.1 (4.8)	−9.8 (14.4)	−3.5 (25.7)	−0.8 (30.6)	−0.4 (31.3)	−3.0 (26.6)	−9.0 (15.8)	−18.0 (−0.4)	−24.1 (−11.4)	−30.6 (−23.1)
Average precipitation mm (inches)	144.4 (5.69)	110.8 (4.36)	112.9 (4.44)	102.8 (4.05)	126.8 (4.99)	133.4 (5.25)	131.4 (5.17)	125.3 (4.93)	111.9 (4.41)	120.6 (4.75)	124.9 (4.92)	167.9 (6.61)	1,513.1 (59.57)
Average precipitation days (≥ 1.0 mm)	10.8	9.8	10.3	10.2	13.3	12.3	11.4	10.8	10.0	10.7	10.8	11.8	132.0
Source: Meteociel

== Population ==
Historical population
Year	Pop.	±% p.a.
1968	4,929	—
1975	5,209	+0.79%
1982	5,255	+0.13%
1990	4,750	−1.26%
1999	4,509	−0.58%
2007	3,878	−1.87%
2012	3,326	−3.02%
2017	3,036	−1.81%
2023	2,893	−0.80%
Source: INSEE

== Twin towns ==
Since 1970, Oberstdorf, Germany, has been a twin town of Megève. It is also located in the mountains and famous for summer and winter holidays.

== Notable people ==
The French actor Stephen Manas (Scènes de ménages, Ted Lasso) grew up in Megève.

In April 2017, Albert II, Prince of Monaco, was named an honorary citizen of Megève.

== Media ==
Megève is the ski resort featured in the beginning of the 1963 film Charade, where Audrey Hepburn's Regina Lampert meets Cary Grant's character. It is also the title of one of the tracks by composer Henry Mancini on the film's soundtrack.

Megève was one of four World Cup venues in the Alps featured in the 1969 film Downhill Racer, starring Robert Redford and Gene Hackman.

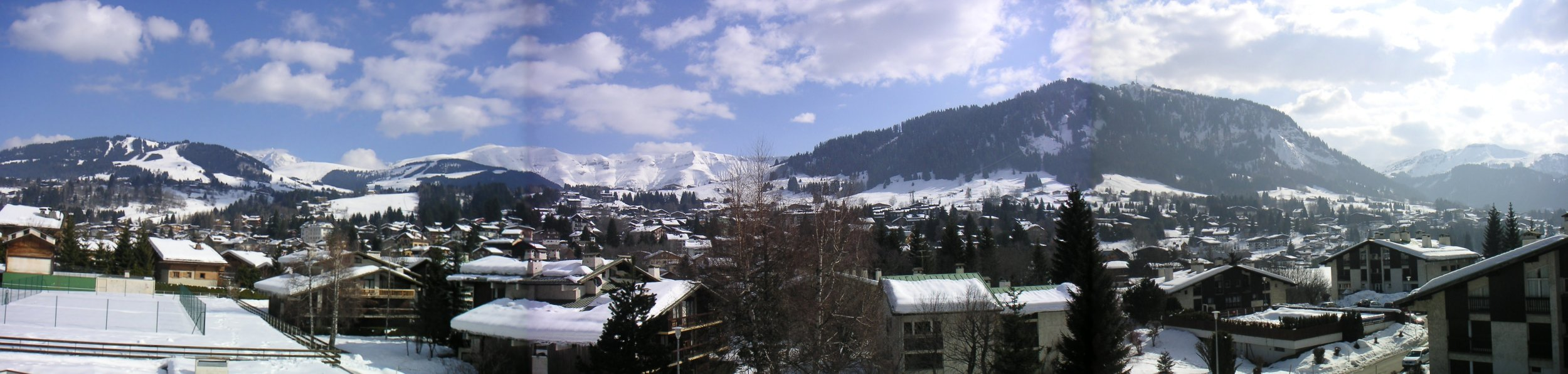
Panoramic view of Megève.

== See also ==
- Communes of the Haute-Savoie department
- Megève Altiport
