= Château des Laurets =

Wine estate in Bordeaux, France

Coordinates: 44.91712°N 0.08161°W

Château des Laurets is a wine estate in Bordeaux.

== History ==
Purchased by Benjamin and Ariane de Rothschild in 2003, the estate stretch on 86 hectares with two appellations: Puisseguin-Saint-Émilion and Montagne-Saint-Émilion.

== Soil ==
The vineyard is based on south-way slopes that sometimes show clay-limestone hilltops.

== Wine ==
Benjamin de Rothschild and Ariane de Rothschild would like the Laurets estate to be a reference in the Puisseguin and Montagne Saint Emilion region, thanks to the Château Clarke experience, and the advice of the famous oenologist Michel Rolland.

The wine is made from older grapevines and composed almost exclusively of Merlot (92%), with 8% of Cabernet Franc, and is aged in barrels during 15–18 months.
