= Henry Jacques Le Même =

French architect

Henry Jacques Le Même (17 October 1897 in Nantes – 17 February 1997) was a French architect.

He designed a second chalet at Domaine du Mont d'Arbois for Noémie de Rothschild in the 1920s.

== Biography ==
Henry Le Même was born on October 17, 1897, in Nantes. He was the son of Henry Ange Le Même, a doctor of medicine, and Marie Hermance Suzanne Savatier.

Enrolled at the Nantes School of Fine Arts (1915-1917), he studied under Jean-Louis Pascal, then Emmanuel Pontremoli at the École Nationale Supérieure des Beaux-Arts. Among his fellow students and friends was Pol Abraham, with whom he carried out several projects, notably the large sanatoriums on the Assy plateau in the commune of Passy in Haute-Savoie. Winner of the Rougevin Prize in 1923, he became a collaborator of Pierre Patout and Jacques-Émile Ruhlmann. The latter contributed greatly to his knowledge of his craft. He was a member of the association created to commemorate the work of Émile-Jacques Ruhlmann and paid tribute to him on March 7, 1984, in a lecture at the Institute entitled “My years with Ruhlmann 1923-1925.” Chief architect for reconstruction and urban planning for the department of Savoie (1945-1950), he was appointed architect of civil buildings and national palaces in 1951. He died on February 17, 1997, in his hundredth year.
