= Stephen Manas =

French actor and music composer

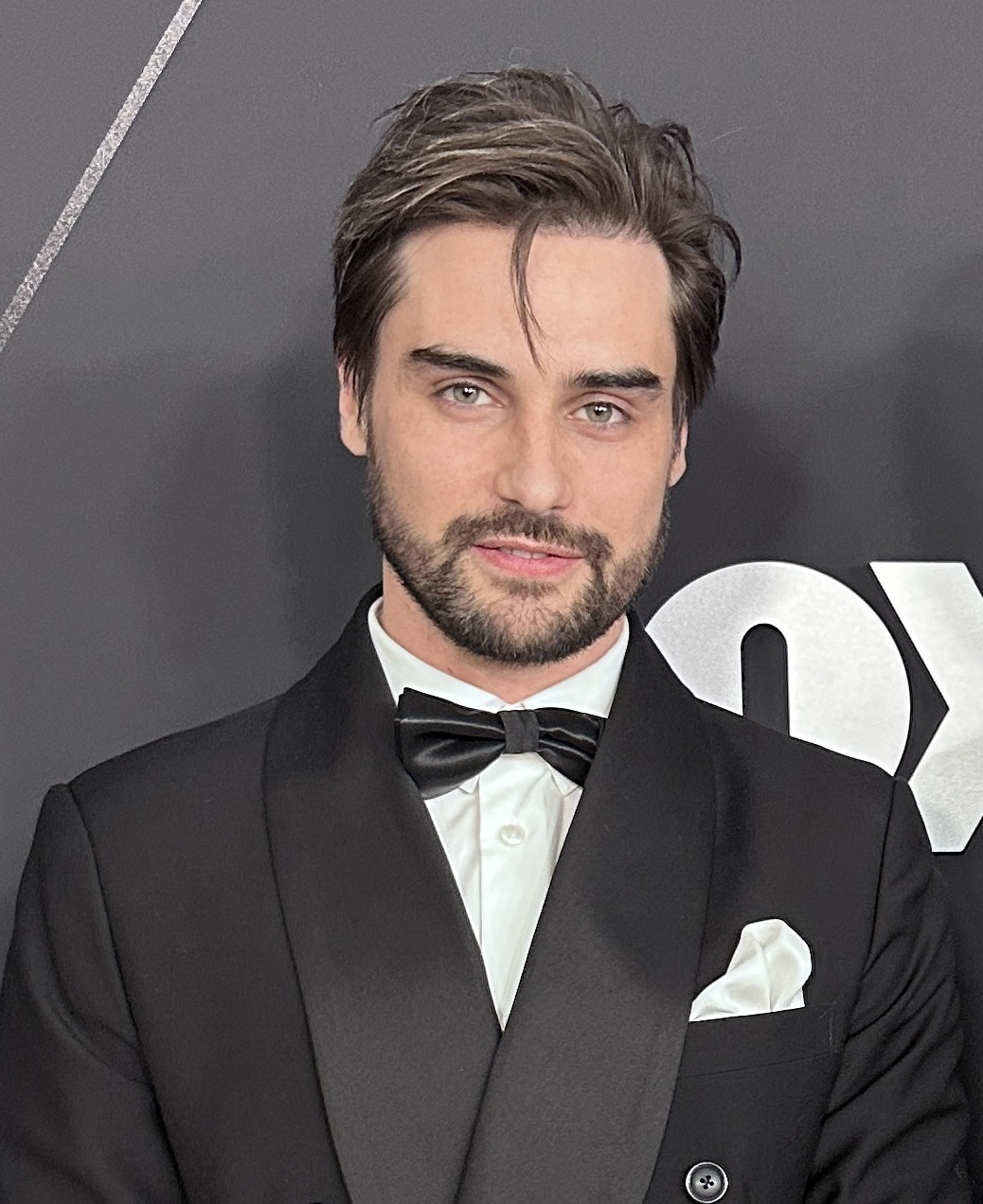
- Manas at the 2023 Emmy Awards.
- Born: Stephen Edouardo Jose Manas; 27 July 1992 (age 33); Saint-Germain-en-Laye, Yvelines, France
- Occupations: Actor, music composer
- Years active: 2012–present
- Website: www.stephenmanas.com

Stephen Manas (French pronunciation: [stɛfɛn manas]; born 27 July 1992) is a French actor and music composer.

Manas spent some of his early career in India, the Philippines, Japan, and the United Kingdom before returning to France. He is best known for his recurring role as Richard Montlaur in the Apple TV+ comedy series Ted Lasso, starring Jason Sudeikis.

== Early life ==
Manas was born on 27 July 1992, in Saint-Germain-en-Laye, Yvelines. He grew up in Megève, a ski resort village in the southeastern Alps in Haute-Savoie, Auvergne-Rhône-Alpes region, France. As his mother was a ski instructor, he found a love for skiing, martial arts, and outdoor sports at a young age. He realized he wanted to work in the film industry after watching Harry Potter and the Philosopher's Stone. He was also interested in music, and played several instruments.

At the age of 17, Manas moved to Lyon to enter an international research school in marketing and communication. Shortly after, he was spotted on the street by an acting scout and was cast for a small role in an independent film. He continued his studies at the University of Paris 1 Pantheon-Sorbonne. After his graduation with a Master 2 in international marketing and communication research, he worked in the business world, but was unsatisfied with his career. He then chose to focus on acting. He spent most of his weekends practising acting, shooting student short films, and playing music.

== Career ==
=== Acting ===
Manas's first role was in the movie Ma premiere fois, directed by Marie-Castille Mention-Schaar. He appeared in many dramas on French television channels TF1, TMC, and M6 during his studies in Paris. After a talent agency based in India cold-called him and offered him a three-year contract, he moved to India where he immersed himself in the Bollywood industry, building his acting résumé.

After two years living and working between Bollywood and Mumbai, then Manila and Tokyo, he returned to France in 2018. Once back in Paris, Manas was chosen for the role of Christian in the short film Out of Frame/Hors Champ. He won multiple awards for this role.

In August 2019, as a first-time guest at the Cannes Film Festival, Manas met an agent specializing in international casting. A month later, he joined the cast of the new series Apple TV+, Ted Lasso in a recurring role, playing Richard Montlaur, a young French player on a Premier League football team in England. The series stars Jason Sudeikis, Hannah Waddingham, Brendan Hunt, Nick Mohammed, Juno Temple, Jeremy Swift, Phil Dunster, and Brett Goldstein.

=== Music ===
Manas started playing music at 8 years old. He first played clarinet in an orchestra in Megève until he was 15, then switched to saxophone and at 18, he learned piano and guitar. He began composing music in 2016. As of 2020, he had his own musical production, Sound-it.

== Filmography ==
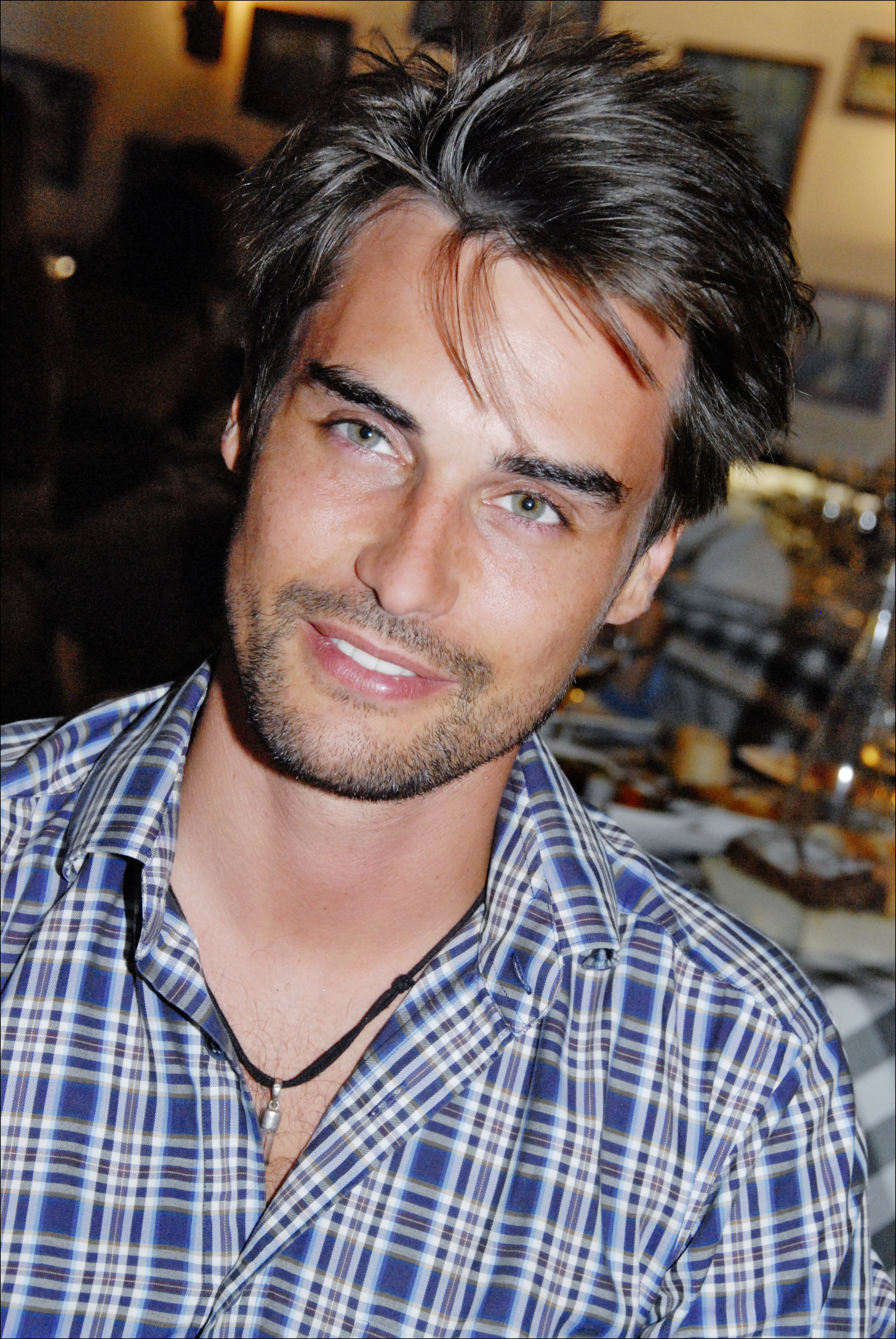
Manas in 2020.

=== Film ===
Year	Title	Role	Notes
2014–2018	Various	Miscellaneous role in Asia	India, Philippines and Japan
2016	Je suis en perdition		Short film
2017	Perdus entre deux étoiles	Peter	Short film
2018	Interférences	Léo	Short film
2018	Out of Frame	Christian	Short film
2019	Building Permit		Short film
2020	Le Bonheur des uns...	Thierry	
2022	The Colors of Fire	Journalist (uncredited)	

=== Television ===
Year	Title	Role	Notes
2017	Scènes de ménages	Delon	1 episode
2017	Petits secrets entre voisin	Fred	Episode: "La fille du patron"
2020–2023	Ted Lasso	Richard Montlaur	Recurring role

=== Music composition ===
Year	Title	Prod	Style	links
2017	Fast and Furious - Courses de rue : Quand les pilotes font la loi	Third Eye Production	Documentary	https://www.youtube.com/watch?v=eDaEOfi7bhg&ab_channel=Speedooz
2017	Fast and Furious, la saga no Limit	Third Eye Production	Documentary	https://www.youtube.com/watch?v=4xkVKDSla_M&ab_channel=BigM%C3%A9diaTV
2022	A Drop of Water on a Volcano	Dreampixies	Documentary	https://pro.imdb.com/title/tt21913960/?ref_=nm_filmo_pastfilmvid_2

== Awards and nominations ==
Year	Award	Category	Nominated work	Result
2019	Actors Awards, Los Angeles	Best Performance of Fest	Out of Frame	Won
2019	Actors Awards, Los Angeles	Best Performance of the Year	Out of Frame	Won
2019	Top Shorts Film Festival	Best Actor	Out of Frame	Won
2019	Top Shorts Film Festival	Best Actor of the Year	Out of Frame	Nominated
2019	Oniros Film Awards	Best Fight Choreography	Out of Frame	First runner-up
2019	AltFF Alternative Film Festival	Best Actor	Out of Frame	Won
2019	Direct Monthly Online Film Festival	Best Film of the Month	Out of Frame	Won
