= Rupert family =

South African family

The Rupert family is a family from Stellenbosch, South Africa.

Anton Rupert (4 October 1916 – 18 January 2006) and his wife Huberte Rupert (3 December 1910 – 28 October 2005) moved to a home in Thibault Street on the northern banks of the Eerste River in the 1950s. His two brothers, Jan and Koos, with their respective wives Ina and Rona also settled in Thibault Street a few years after their arrival.

Anton and Huberte had three children: Johann, Antonij and Hanneli. The boys attended Pretoria Boys High, while Hanneli went to Bloemhof High School. In the early years Huberte would deliver the children to school and perform secretarial duties at the Rembrandt office which was situated in Bird Street.

The Rupert family was listed as 272nd on the list of the 500 wealthiest worldwide, with a net worth of $2.3 billion, in March 2005. In June 2020, the family was ranked as the 375th on Forbes "Billionaires 2020" list, with a fortune of $5.2 billion.

Anton and Huberte were considered philanthropists, supporting a number of projects for the preservation of the arts. In 2020, the Rupert Family donated the sum of ZAR1 billion towards the Sukuma Relief Fund in South Africa to assist small and medium businesses across the country that are affected by the COVID-19 pandemic in South Africa and resultant state-ordered lock-down.
