= Ariane de Rothschild =

French banker

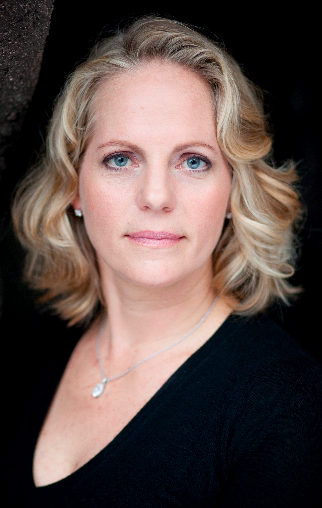
- Rothschild in 2009
- Born: Ariane Langner; November 14, 1965 (age 60); San Salvador, El Salvador
- Education: Sciences Po (BA); Pace University (MBA)
- Occupation: CEO of Edmond de Rothschild Group
- Spouse: Benjamin de Rothschild (m. 1999; died 2021)
- Children: Noémie de Rothschild; Alice de Rothschild; Eve de Rothschild; Olivia de Rothschild
- Parents: Gustave Langner (father); Michelle Schmittlin (mother)
- Family: Rothschild

Ariane de Rothschild (née Langner; 14 November 1965) is a French banker and the CEO of Edmond de Rothschild Group since March 2023. She is the first woman and the first person without Rothschild lineage to run a Rothschild-branded financial institution.

She was married to Benjamin de Rothschild from 1999 until his death in 2021. They have four daughters.

In 2024, the net worth of the Benjamin de Rothschild family was estimated at €5 billion by French weekly business magazine Challenges.

== Family ==
Ariane Langner was born in San Salvador, El Salvador. Her father, Gustave Langner, a German national born 20 October 1920, was a senior executive at the international pharmaceutical company Hoechst. Until the age of eighteen, Ariane Langner lived with her parents in Bangladesh, Colombia and the former Zaire (DRC).

In January 1999, she married Benjamin de Rothschild, the son of Edmond de Rothschild and heir to the Edmond de Rothschild Group. The couple had four daughters. Her husband died on 15 January 2021 following a heart attack at their home in Pregny-Chambésy, Switzerland.

de Rothschild is not Jewish and did not convert to her husband’s religion; however, two of their daughters identify as Jewish. In addition to being fluent in French, English, Spanish, Italian, and German, she possesses a working knowledge of Hebrew.

== Education ==
Ariane Langner attended the French lycée in Zaire, studied at Sciences Po in Paris and holds an MBA in financial management from Pace University in New York, where she studied from 1988 to 1990.

== Career ==
While studying at Pace, Ariane Langner was a broker at Société Générale in New York City. After graduating in 1990, she joined AIG’s New York offices, and relocated to AIG's trading floor in Paris the same year. She met Benjamin de Rothschild, a client of AIG, in 1993.

After marrying Benjamin de Rothschild in 1999, Ariane de Rothschild joined the family business La Compagnie Financière Edmond de Rothschild (LCF) by taking on the management of the group's lifestyle assets (wineries, farms, hotels, restaurants). In 2005, she restructured the group's philanthropic activities with the intent to develop a sustainable "return on engagement" philanthropic model, which led to the creation of the Edmond de Rothschild Foundations, a structure active in five different fields : Art and culture, health and research, philanthropy, cultural dialogue and social entrepreneurship.

In 2006, she joined the supervisory board of LCF Edmond de Rothschild. In 2008, she was appointed board member of the group, and vice-president in 2009. She focused her agenda on environmental and social impact investments, and on restructuring the company's scattered assets and subsidiaries. In 2010, LCF Edmond de Rothschild changed its name to Edmond de Rothschild Group. In 2014, all of the group's financial and non-financial assets were reorganized within the group's structure. In 2015, the group published a sustainability report for the first time.

On 30 January 2015, Ariane de Rothschild became the president of the executive committee, overseeing the group's operations. She was nominated to give a new impetus to the company. She brought a self-proclaimed "panache" to the spirit of the bank, sparking innovation within the group's executive lines and breaking the ice in the banking industry with a new leadership style.

In 2016, she finalized the reorganization of the group's lifestyle assets under the new label Edmond de Rothschild Heritage. She pulled the Edmond de Rothschild Group out of Asia and, the following year, in 2017, she implemented the Avaloq banking technology. In March 2019, the company removed Edmond de Rothschild (Switzerland) S.A. from public trading, making it entirely held by the group. Ariane de Rothschild became chairman of the board. The French business was folded into the Swiss company to simplify the structure of the group. In January 2021, her husband Benjamin de Rothschild died, which gave her majority control over the Edmond de Rothschild Group via her four daughters’ votes. In March 2023, she took over as CEO of the group.

== Other activities ==
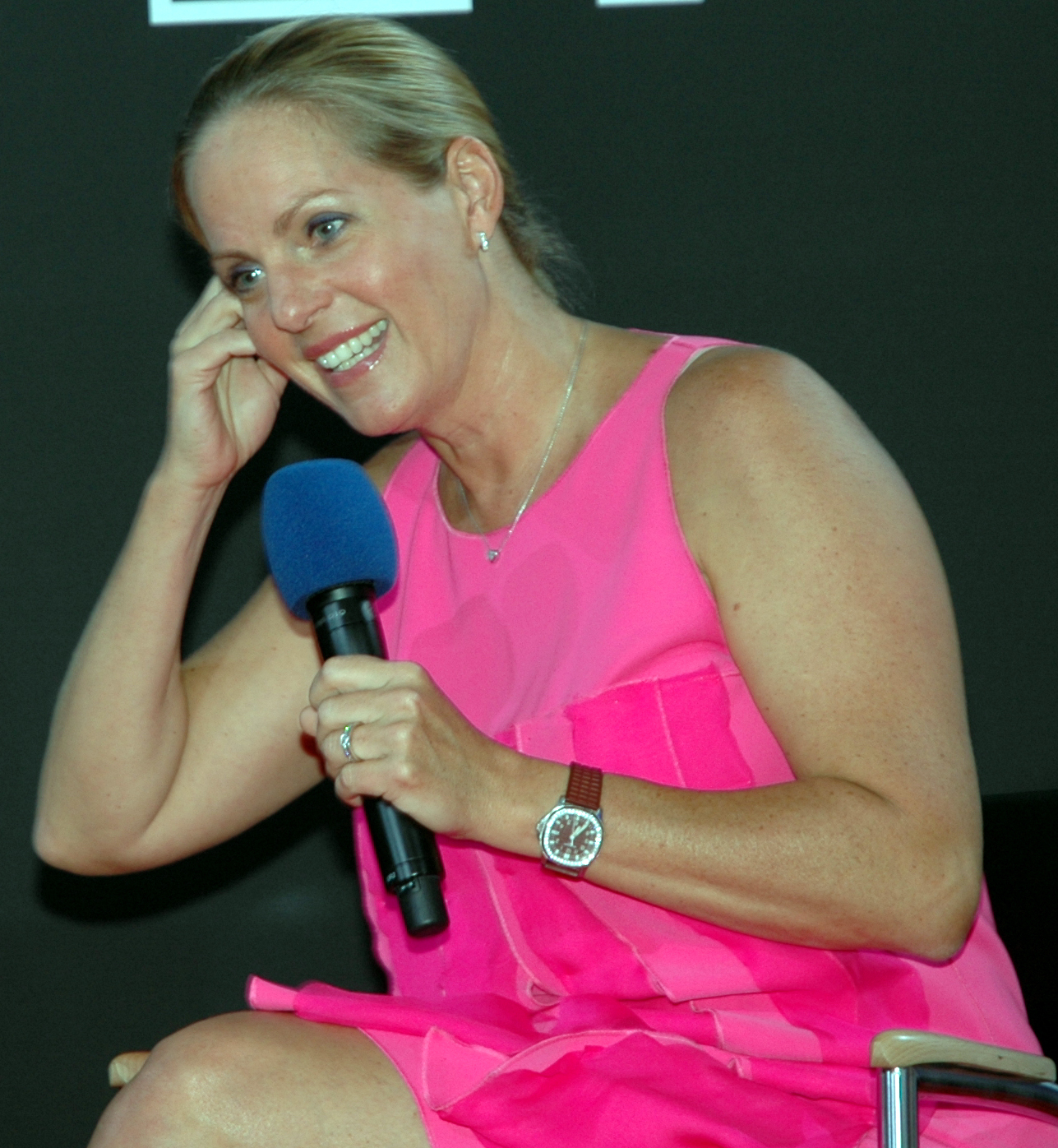
Rothschild in 2012

From 2003 to 2011, the Ariane de Rothschild Art Prize awarded contemporary art initiatives. The Ariane de Rothschild Women's Doctoral Program in Israel was launched in 2009 to provide full financial support and enhanced educational programs to women pursuing a doctoral program. The following year, in 2010, the Ariane de Rothschild Fellowship Program was launched to foster intercultural dialogue through social entrepreneurship and social science, especially between the Jewish and Muslim communities.

In 2012, she talked with Warren Buffett about philanthropy in the first scene of the documentary The Billionaires' Pledge.

In 2018, she led the acquisition of the fragrance company Parfums Caron and managed the revival of the brand, focusing its distribution on Middle Eastern countries.

In 2000, Ariane de Rothschild and her husband Benjamin de Rothschild founded Team Gitana, an offshore sailing team, continuing the Rothschild family's longstanding involvement in sailing.After the death of her husband in 2021, she took over the management of the team, which will participate in the Route du Rhum 2026.

In 2021, she released the first vintage of the rosé wine L'Amistà (Château Roubine, Côtes de Provence) she co-developed.

=== Relationship with Jeffrey Epstein ===
In 2023, a Wall Street Journal investigation revealed that de Rothschild had more than a dozen meetings with the financier and convicted sex offender Jeffrey Epstein. The bank initially denied that she had met with him, but later admitted that Rothschild "met with Epstein as part of her normal duties at the bank between 2013 and 2019". The journal also reported that she was ready to help him find assistants. In 2025, Wall Street Journal reported that in 2015 de Rothschild negotiated a $25 million consulting contract with Epstein.

In March 2026, French financial prosecutors announced that the Paris arm of Ariane's company the Edmond de Rothschild Group was among several locations which were searched in connection to the Epstein investigation.

==== Ehud Barak ====
According to leaked emails and investigative reports released in late 2025, former Israeli Prime Minister Ehud Barak and Ariane de Rothschild were linked through a network of business and political dealings brokered by late financier Jeffrey Epstein.

=== Family disputes ===
Ariane sued her mother-in-law Nadine de Rothschild in Swiss courts to prevent her from using the name "Edmond" in her foundation's name (in reference to Nadine's late husband Edmond de Rothschild). Her claim was later denied by the Federal Supreme Court of Switzerland in 2025. Ariane, who controls 65.94% of Edmond de Rothschild Group, is also suing Nadine de Rothschild over the heritage left by Edmond.

== Recognition ==
- 2022: Swiss Finance's Women To Watch
- 2024 : named by Financial News in the “100 Most Influential Women in European Finance”.
