= Yves Perrier =

French financial manager (born 1954)

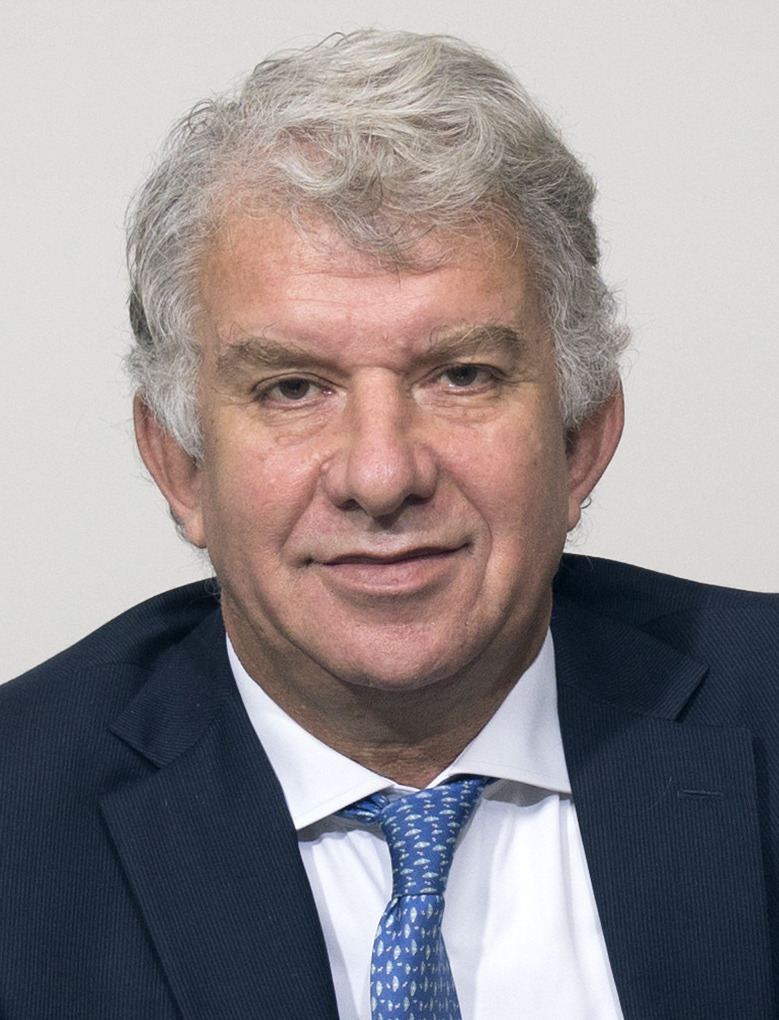
- Born: 1954 (age 71–72)
- Education: ESSEC Business School; Chartered accountant
- Occupations: Chief Executive Officer, Amundi; Deputy General Manager, Crédit Agricole
- Awards: Officer of the French Legion of Honour; Officer of the French National Order of Merit

Yves Perrier (born 1954 in Scionzier) is a French financial manager. He was chief executive officer (CEO) of Amundi from the creation of the company in 2010 to 2021.

From 1987 onward, he successively held the roles of Chief Financial Officer at Société Générale, Executive Committee member at Crédit Lyonnais, Executive Committee member at Crédit Agricole, Deputy Chief Executive Officer of Calyon, which later became CACIB (the investment banking arm of Crédit Agricole), after which he was Chief Executive Officer for Crédit Agricole Asset Management (CAAM), which became Amundi in 2010.

During his career, he oversaw the merger of the investment banking activities at Crédit Lyonnais and Crédit Agricole in 2002–2003, then led and implemented the merger of Société Générale Asset Management and CAAM, creating Amundi group, which he brought to its introduction on the Paris stock exchange in 2015. In 2017, Perrier oversaw Amundi's acquisition of Pioneer Investments, a subsidiary of Unicredit.

== Biography ==
=== Early life and education ===
Yves Perrier was born in 1954 to a family from the Arve Valley in the Haute-Savoie region of France. His father is a craftsman who works in the field of bar turning, an activity that has a long history in the region.

After attending a foundation course, he studied at the ESSEC Business School in Paris, where he graduated in 1976. He also holds a degree as an Expert-comptable (the French equivalent of a CPA or Chartered accountant).

=== Career ===
==== 1977–2010 ====
Yves Perrier began his professional career in 1977. After ten years in the field of audit and consulting, he joined Société Générale in 1987, where he went on to become chief financial officer (CFO) in 1995. In 1999, following the stock market struggle among Société Générale, BNP and Paribas, Perrier moved to Crédit Lyonnais as a member of the executive committee in charge of finance, risk and internal audit and control. In 2002, he oversaw the Crédit Lyonnais merger with Crédit Agricole, which was completed in 2003.

He became a member of the Crédit Agricole group's Executive Committee in 2003 and held several different roles in the company. From 2002 to 2004, he was head of risk and deputy chief executive officer of the group's Corporate and Investment Banking (CIB) division. In this capacity, he orchestrated the merging of CIB activities between Crédit Lyonnais and those of Crédit Agricole Indosuez, resulting in the 2004 creation of Calyon (now CACIB), of which he became deputy chief executive officer in charge of Structured Finance, Brokerage, Risk, Support Functions and the International Network.

In 2007, Perrier was appointed head of the Asset Management and Institutional Services division at Crédit Agricole. In this capacity, he was chairman and chief executive officer of Crédit Agricole Asset Management (CAAM) and chairman of the supervisory board at Caceis. In 2009, he led the merger combining the activities of CAAM and SGAM (Société Générale Asset Management), giving rise on 1 January 2010, to Amundi, of which he became chief executive officer. At that time, Amundi was 75% owned by Crédit Agricole, with 25% held by Société Générale.

==== Since 2010 ====
Yves Perrier has helmed the development of Amundi, with assets under management growing from €670 billion at the beginning of 2010 to more than €1.4 trillion in 2017. Growth has largely come from international sources, driven by increasing business with institutional clients and partner banking networks other than those of its shareholders. This expansion reflects a strategy put in place to industrialise internal processes and offer services to a range of different client segments within the framework of both a global and local organisation. The approach has produced efficiency and profitability that are among the highest within the sector: Amundi's cost-to-income ratio, stood at 53.1% in 2016 for an average of 65% for the sector. This overall strategy has also resulted in several workforce reduction plans.

In 2015, Yves Perrier supervised the group's initial public offering on the Paris stock market. The IPO was the largest transaction in several years on the Paris stock exchange. In 2017, Amundi acquired Pioneer Investments, in which the integration period was achieved within 18 months.

In 2015, Perrier was also appointed Deputy General Manager, Head of the Savings, Insurance and Property division of Crédit Agricole, in charge of the Savings, Insurance and Property division, while continuing his role as CEO of Amundi.

=== Contributions to the Paris Financial Centre ===
In June 2010, Yves became Chairman of the Institutional Investors Committee of Paris Europlace. In this capacity, he published a report on savings in 2010 entitled: "The Development of Long-Term Savings." He was appointed vice-president of the association on 26 June 2018.

On 19 May 2015, Perrier became Chairman of the Association Française de la Gestion Financière (AFG, the French financial managers association), succeeding Paul-Henri de La Porte du Theil. On 30 May 2017, he became an honorary chairman of the association, handing over the chairmanship to Eric Pinon.

In 2020, with Jean-Dominique Senard, he is co-chair of a working group created by the Institut Montaigne and the Comité Médicis, resulting in the publication of a report entitled "Responsible capitalism: an opportunity for Europe". In it, Perrier and Senard call on Europe to become a continent of "responsible capitalism", by emphasizing long-term financing and the creation of a common legal framework in reaction to the economic impact of the COVID-19 pandemic.

=== Compensation ===
Yves Perrier’s compensation was €3 million in 2018, comprising €1 million in fixed compensation and €2 million in variable compensation. In 2018, the Financial Times published an article focusing on the relative remuneration of CEOs at the world's leading asset management companies noting that Yves Perrier's remuneration is one of the lowest in the industry.

In 2020, in the context of the COVID-19 pandemic, he gives up half of his €2 million bonus for 2019 in favor of a COVID-19 solidarity fund set up by Crédit Agricole for the benefit of elderly people.

== Awards and distinctions ==
- Officer of the French Legion of Honour
- Officer of the French National Order of Merit
- Received the "European Asset Management Personality of The Year" distinction, awarded by Funds Europe magazine in 2010
- Received the "CEO of the Year" award from Financial News in 2017
- Nominated among the "Strategists of the Year" by Les Echos in 2017
- Received the "European Outstanding Achievement" award from Funds Europe magazine in 2018
- Received the "CEO of the Year" award at the 2019 Investment Excellence Awards organized by the Global Investor Group
- Received the "Editor's Choice" award at the 2021 Asset Management Awards organized by Financial News
