= Cleon Peterson =

American contemporary artist (born 1973)

- Born: 1973 (age 52–53); Seattle, Washington, U.S.
- Education: ArtCenter College of Design (BFA); Cranbrook Academy of Art (MFA)
- Known for: Painting, murals
- Website: cleonpeterson.com

Cleon Peterson (born 1973) is an American contemporary artist based in Los Angeles. His paintings and murals are characterized by stylized human figures engaged in scenes of controversial racial violence and conflict, and frequently address themes of power, domination and social disorder.

== Early life and education ==
Peterson was born in Seattle, Washington, in 1973. He experienced a troubled youth before pursuing art as a career.

Peterson earned a BFA from ArtCenter College of Design in Pasadena, California, in 2004 and a MFA from Cranbrook Academy of Art in Michigan in 2006.

== Career ==
Peterson began his career in graphic design and illustration and worked for Shepard Fairey's design agency, Studio Number One.

In 2016, Peterson created Endless Sleep, a mural painted beneath the Eiffel Tower for Nuit Blanche in Paris. The work depicted intertwined black-and-white figures and drew on imagery associated with classical Greek art and street art.

He also participated in Lasco Project #8 at the Palais de Tokyo in Paris.

In 2018, the Museum of Contemporary Art Denver presented Shadow of Men, a solo exhibition of Peterson's murals, paintings and sculptures. The exhibition addressed violence, power and social conflict and drew partly on Peterson's personal history.

== Artistic style and themes ==
Peterson's work commonly depicts simplified human figures engaged in scenes of violence, conflict and domination. His compositions frequently use a limited palette, particularly black, white and red, with flattened forms and sharply defined silhouettes.

His work frequently addresses power, social disorder and cycles of violence. The Museum of Contemporary Art Denver described the imagery in Shadow of Men as exploring violence through contrasting black-and-white figures and themes of rage, mercy and repression.

Political themes have also appeared in Peterson's work. His 2018 exhibition Blood & Soil addressed political division and authoritarian imagery in the United States.

== Exhibitions ==
Selected solo exhibitions include:

- Shadow of Men, Museum of Contemporary Art Denver, Denver (2018)
- Blood & Soil, Over the Influence, Los Angeles (2018), featuring paintings, bronze sculptures and a large-scale sculpture.
- Mr. Sinister, albertz benda, New York (2022).
- Under the Sun, the Moon, and the Stars, Kaikai Kiki Gallery, Tokyo (2023), featuring 27 new paintings.

== Critical reception ==
Peterson's work has drawn differing critical responses. Reviewing Shadow of Men at MCA Denver, Ray Mark Rinaldi of The Denver Post described the exhibition as difficult to look at while arguing that it compelled viewers to confront darker aspects of human behavior.

Coverage of Blood & Soil emphasized the political content of Peterson's work. It's Nice That described the exhibition as directly addressing American politics, while Artsy discussed the paintings in the context of political division in the United States.

A review in Hyperallergic of Shadow of Men examined the racial implications of Peterson's black-and-white figures and questioned how violence and race were presented within the museum setting.
