= Mont d'Arbois =

Mountain in France

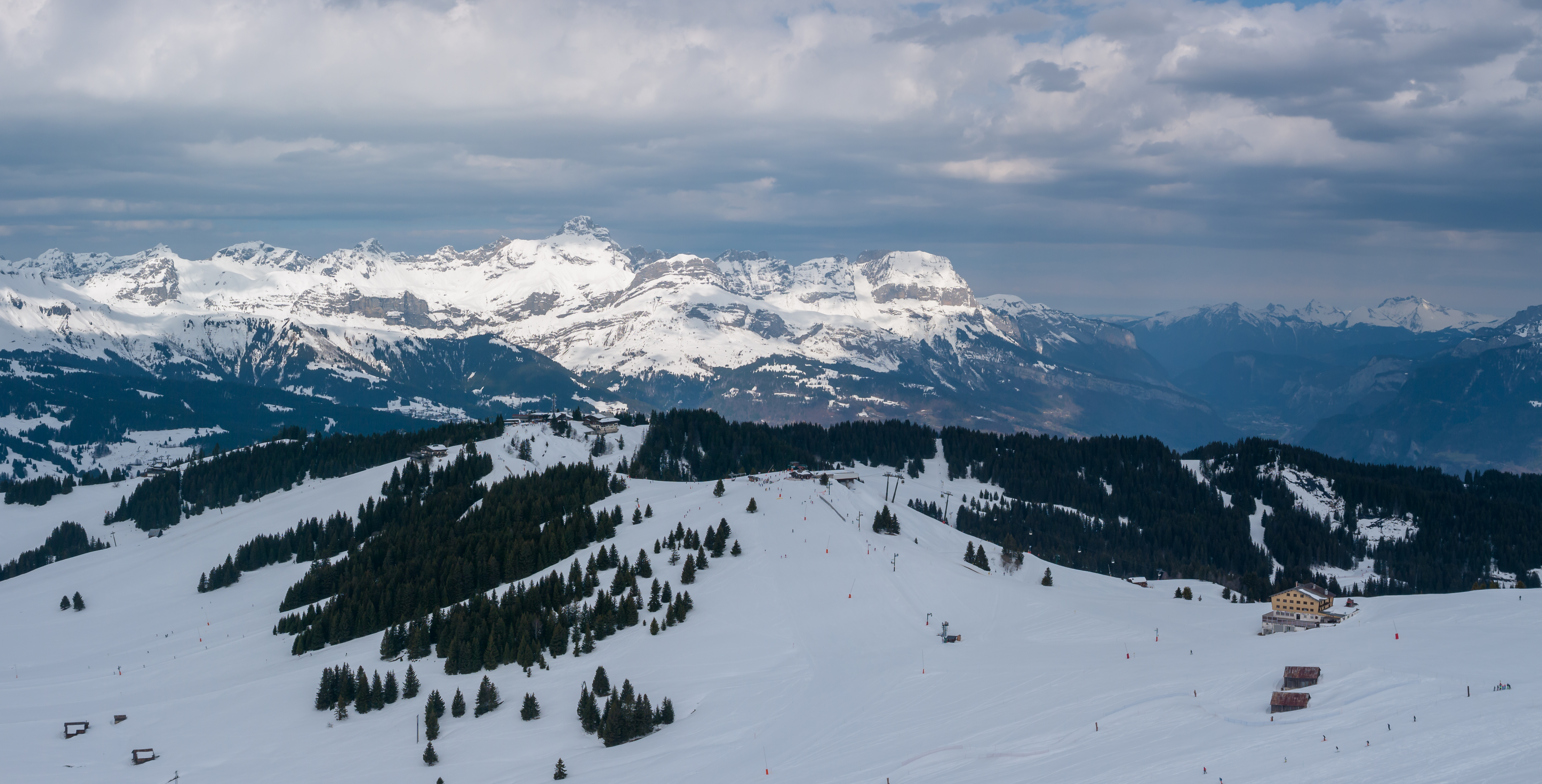
- Peak of Mont d'Arbois (centre) seen from above

Highest point
- Elevation: 1,833 m (6,014 ft)
- Coordinates: 45°51′17″N 06°40′10″E

Geography
- Location within France
- Location: Haute-Savoie, France
- Parent range: Beaufortain Massif

Mont d'Arbois is a mountain of Haute-Savoie, France. It lies in the Beaufortain Massif range, at an altitude of 1833 metres above sea level.

== History ==
The Mont d'Arbois is home to the Domaine du Mont d'Arbois, developed by Noémie de Rothschild in 1921.

During World War II, French journalist Émile Servan-Schreiber hid here in his "Chalet Nanouk" with his Jewish family, including his Yiddish-speaking mother.
