= Edmond Adolphe de Rothschild =

French-born Swiss financier

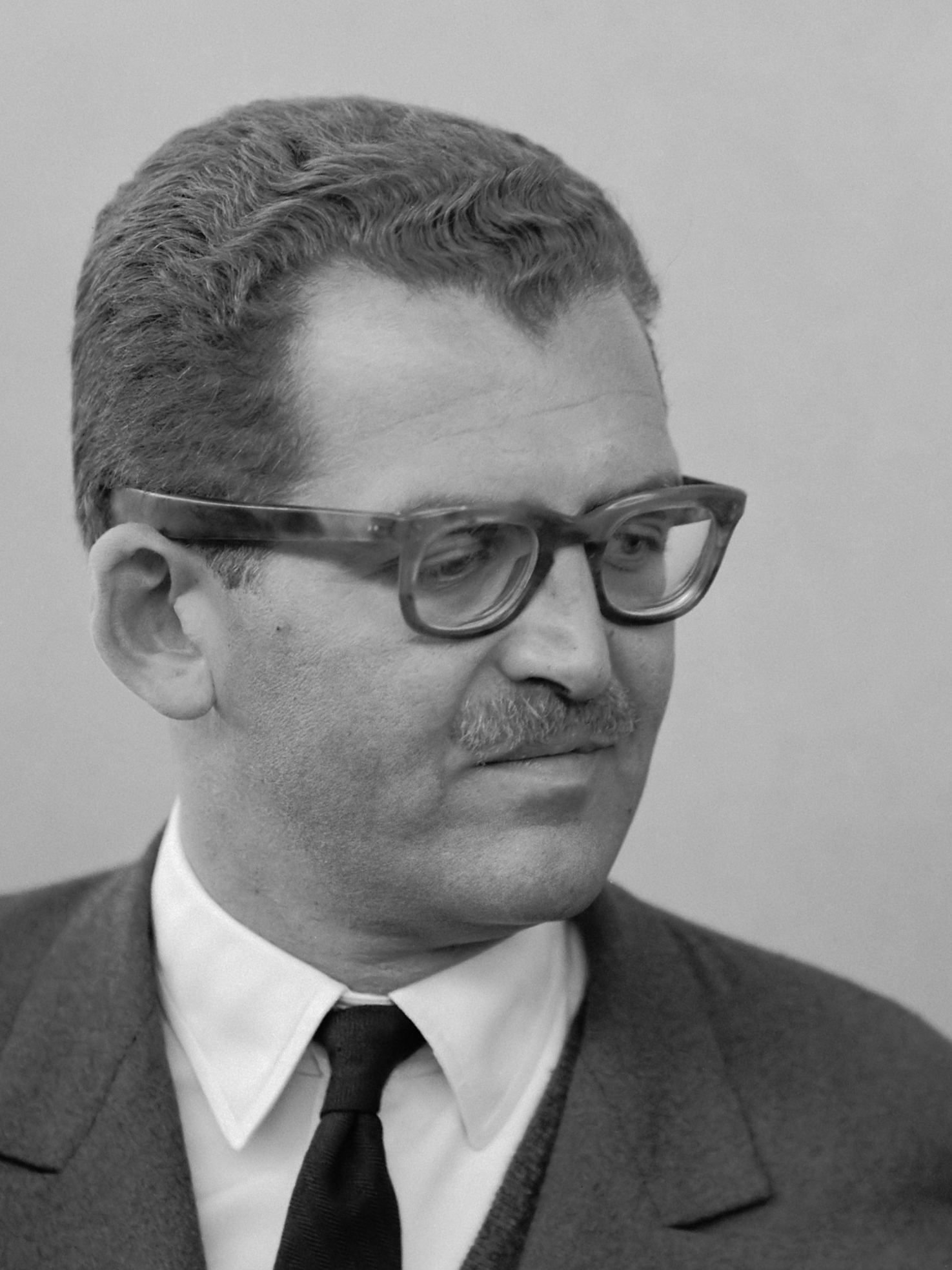
- Edmond de Rothschild in 1961.
- Born: Edmond Adolphe Maurice Jules Jacques de Rothschild; 30 September 1926; Paris, France
- Died: 2 November 1997 (aged 71); Geneva, Switzerland
- Resting place: Château Clarke
- Education: Geneva University; Faculty of Law of Paris
- Occupation: Banker
- Spouses: Veselinka Vladova Gueorguieva (m. 1958; ann. 1960) Nadine Lhopitalier (m. 1963)
- Children: Benjamin de Rothschild (1963–2021)
- Parent(s): Maurice de Rothschild; Noémie Halphen

Baron Edmond Adolphe Maurice Jules Jacques de Rothschild (30 September 1926 – 2 November 1997) was a French-Swiss banker, the founder of the Edmond de Rothschild Group in 1953. His investments extended to vineyards, yacht racing, farming and hospitality.

Scion of the Rothschild banking family of France, he was the only son of Maurice and Noémie de Rothschild. He married Nadine Lhopitalier in 1963 with whom he had one child, Benjamin de Rothschild. He was reportedly the richest member of the Rothschild family until his death in 1997. He was the great-great-grandson of Sephardi-Jew of Portuguese descent Jacob Rodrigues Pereira.

== Family ==
The only son of Baron Maurice de Rothschild and Baroness Noémie de Rothschild (née Halphen), Edmond Adolphe was born into the Rothschild banking family of France. He was the grandson of Edmond James de Rothschild and great-grandson of the French branch's founder James Mayer de Rothschild.

Edmond de Rothschild's family was forced to move from France to Switzerland in July 1940, after Maurice de Rothschild, Edmond's father, was declared a noncitizen. Maurice was part of the 80 members of France's Upper House to oppose the pro-Nazi Vichy regime openly, voting against giving full powers to Maréchal Philippe Pétain.

Baron Edmond de Rothschild's first marriage was with the Bulgarian artist Veselinka Vladova Gueorguieva in 1958. They separated shortly afterwards and the union was dissolved. On June 26, 1963, the Baron married the French actress Nadine Nelly Jeannette Lhopitalier, also known by her stage name as Nadine Tallier, whom he had met in 1960. They had a son, Benjamin Edmond Maurice Adolphe Henri Isaac de Rothschild (1963-2021).

== Biography ==
=== Banking ===
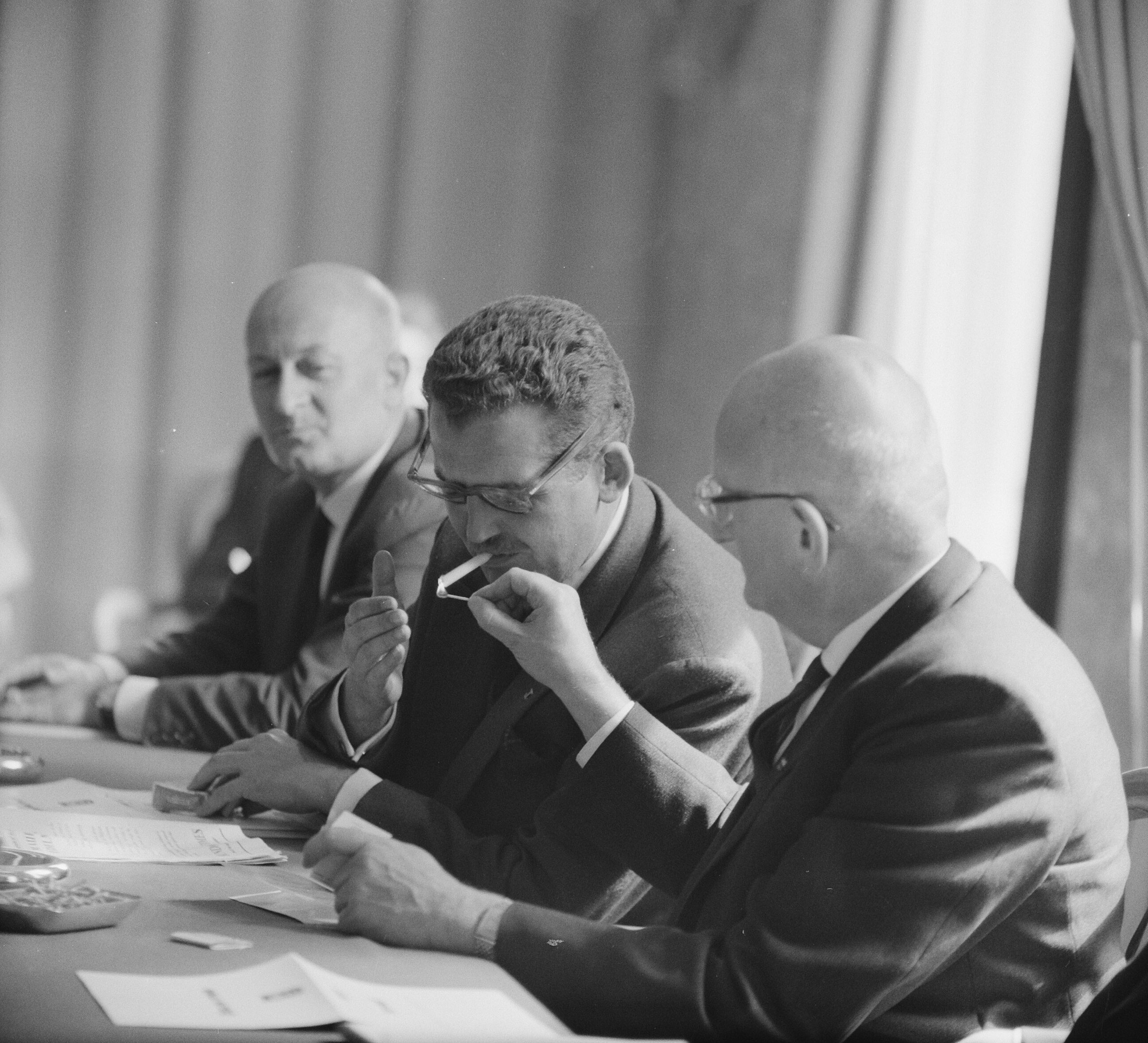
Edmond de Rothschild in 1961

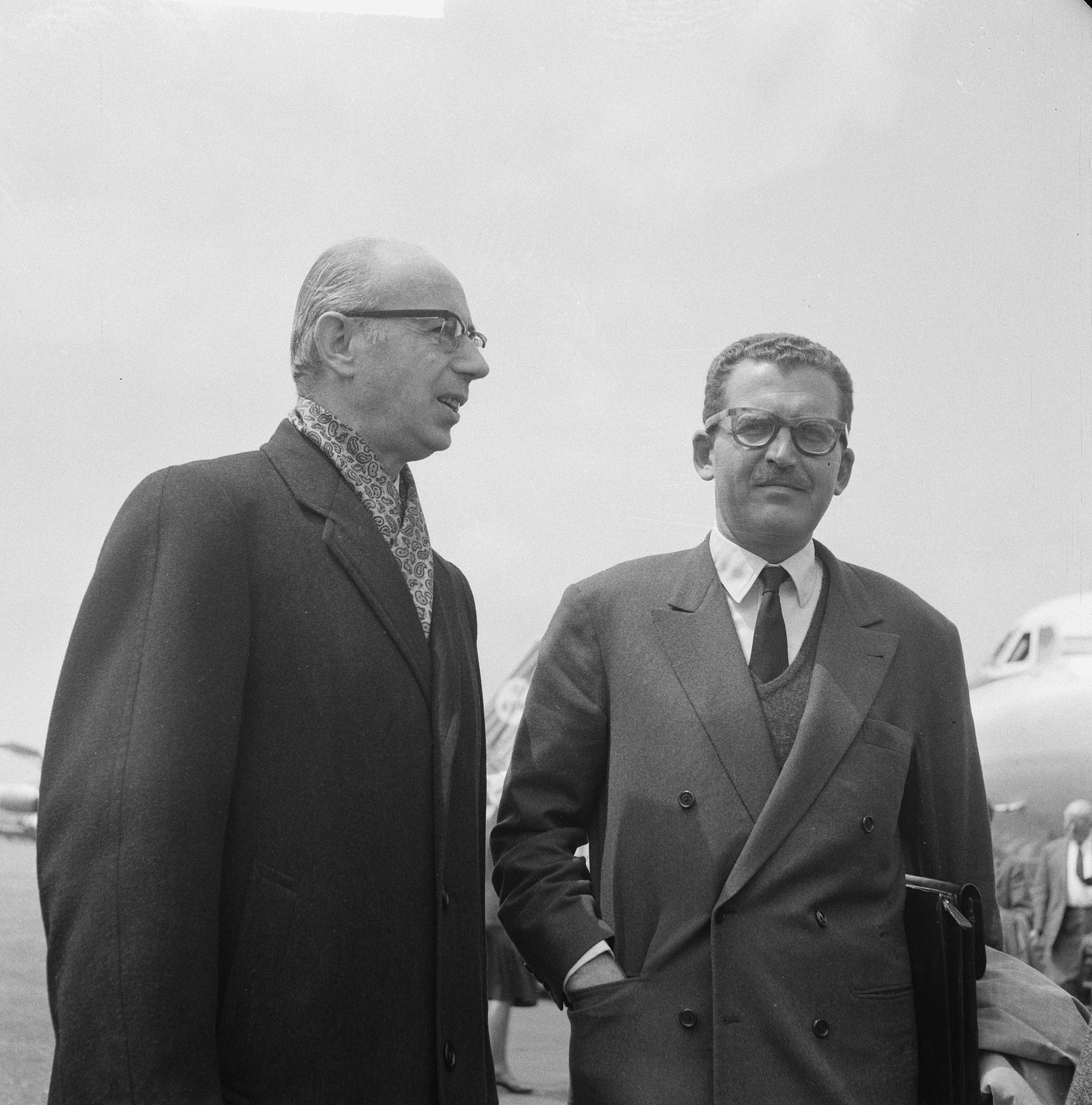
Edmond de Rothschild in 1961

Edmond de Rothschild attended the International School of Geneva. He studied at the University of Geneva and at the Faculty of Law in Paris.

Shortly after finishing his studies, Edmond de Rothschild joined the de Rothschild Frères bank where he worked for three years. In 1953, he founded his first company, La Compagnie Financière Edmond de Rothschild, which became his main investment arm. In 1965, he launched Banque Privée Edmond de Rothschild, and developed branches in Lugano (1968), Luxembourg (1969), Fribourg (1989) and Lausanne (1992). In 1969, he established the first hedge fund of funds.

In 1961, after visiting a Club Med vacation center in Israel, the Baron decided to settle the business debt of the company, back then on the brink of bankruptcy, and invest in its development. He owned 34% of Club Med (around 10 million francs worth of shares) which was listed in the Paris stock exchange in 1966. He acquired a major stake in the Bank of California in 1973, for $22 million, establishing it as a holding company for his investments in the United States. He kept his share of the company until 1984, year he sold it at three times its original value to Mitsubishi Bank. In 1976, he was approached by the French businessmen Vincent Bolloré to back him in rebooting his family business. Edmond de Rothschild joined in and left the Bolloré saga in 1981. In 1985, he bought 45% of the French flower retailer Monceau Fleurs. His group held this share until 2001.

Edmond de Rothschild invested heavily in the Tel-Aviv-based Israel General Bank, contributing to the newly created State of Israel. He later became president of this institution. After the Six-Day War, the Baron contributed to the creation of the Israel Corporation Investment fund when, in 1968, he was invited alongside other wealthy individuals by Israeli Finance Minister Pinchas Sapir to the so-called Millionaire's Conference. Each guest was asked to invest $100,000 in the creation of the Corporation. He also promoted major projects in the country via the Clali Bank, another of his ventures in Israel, which he sold in 1996. The Baron was President of the Caesarea Development Corporation and of the Israel European Company Isrop (in Luxembourg). He contributed to the creation of the Supreme Court building in Jerusalem. and was the founder of multiple cultural and educational institutions in Israel.

In 1982, he acquired a 10% share of his cousin David's new venture, Rothschild & Co. This investment lasted until 2018, after the cousin companies settled a legal dispute over the use of the Rothschild family name. Edmond de Rothschild was also a major shareholder of the Italian bank Banca Tiburtina, and minority shareholder of Banca Privata Solari & Blum in Lugano, Banque de Gestion Edmond de Rothschild in Luxembourg, and the Israel General Bank in Tel-Aviv, as well as investments in De Beers Consolidated Mines.

Edmond de Rothschild died of emphysema on 2 November 1997 in Geneva at the age of 71. He was buried at the Château Clarke. His son Benjamin succeeded him at the head of the Compagnie Financière Edmond de Rothschild.

=== Sailing ===
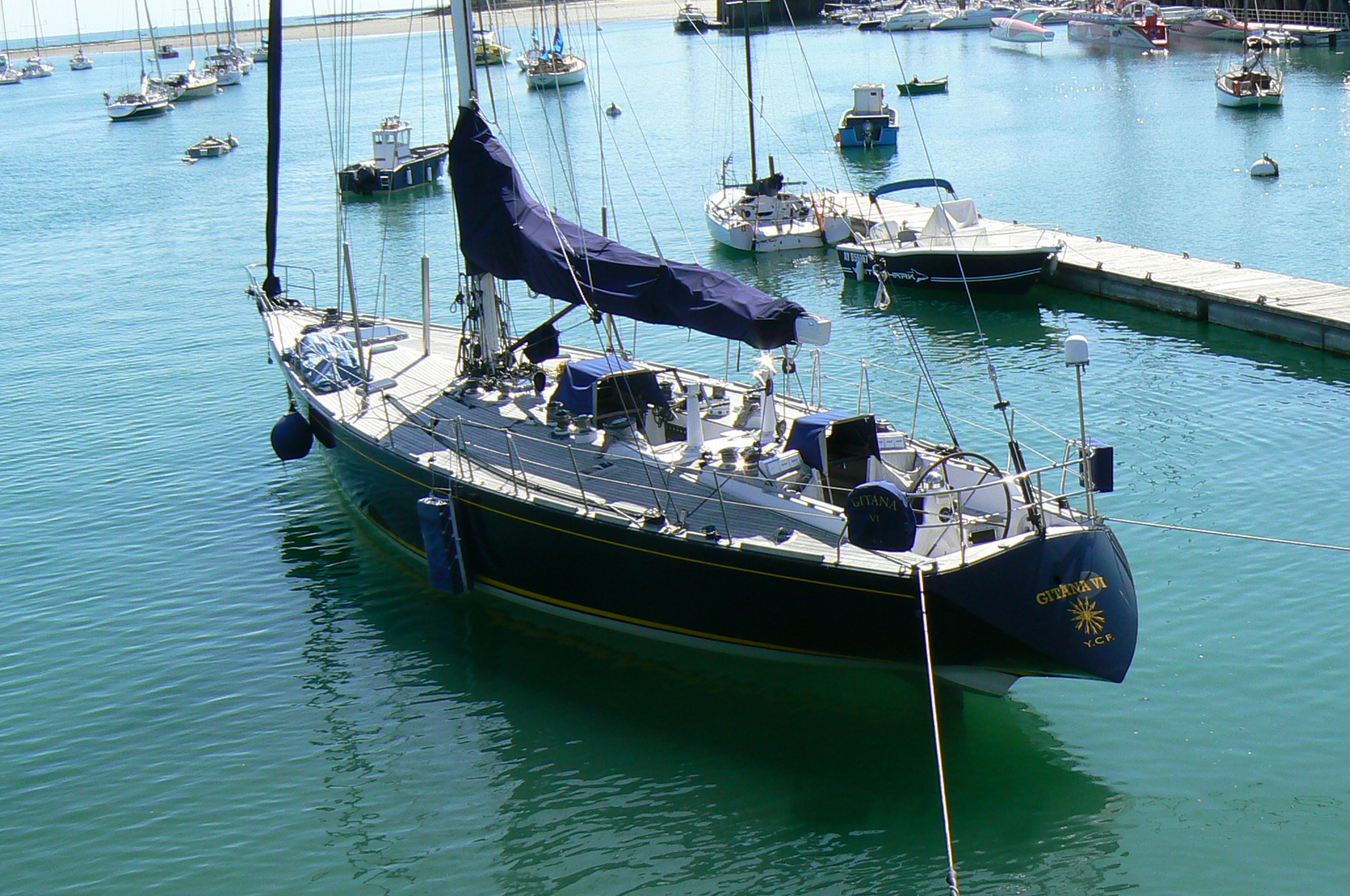
Gitana VI

At the tail end of the 1960s, Baron Edmond de Rothschild revitalized the family tradition for yacht racing, shifting the focus from motorboats to monohull sailboats. He commissioned six new Gitanas (III to VIII) designed by prominent firms of naval architects. These newfangled ships were successful in competitions such as the RORC races, and the 1965 Fastnet Race won by the Gitana IV. Being especially fond of larger racing ships, the Baron created the A Class or "Maxi" class, a racing category comprising yachts exceeding 21 m (70 ft) in length.

In 2001, his son Benjamin founded the Gitana Team of racing yachts. In 2017, the Gitana Team introduced the 32x23-meter Maxi Edmond de Rothschild (Gitana 17), the offshore racing's first maxi-multihull designed to fly in the open ocean.

=== Wines, hospitality, nature ===
In 1973, Edmond de Rothschild bought Château Clarke, a 12th-century estate in the Médoc region. From 1974 to 1978, he remodeled the abandoned domain and created around 133 acres of vineyards. He was an investor in Domaines Barons Rothschild, which owned Château Lafite Rothschild and Chateau Rieussec, and also developed the vineyards of Peyre-Lebade and Malmaison.

He also held a major stake in Savour Club, a large mail-order wine business. Days before his death, the Baron published Le Culte du Vin in which he recollected his knowledge and experiences in wine production and tasting. Two special accolades were posthumously named in his honor in 1998: the "Baron Edmond de Rothschild Prize for Young Sommeliers" awarded by the Parisian Sommeliers Association, and the "Edmond de Rothschild Prize" for best wine book of the year.

Edmond de Rothschild inherited the Domaine du Mont d'Arbois. In 1960, he bought the Chalet Eve. Three years later, he expanded and renovated the Palace des Neiges and bought the Gervais Chalet. In 1964, he integrated a golf course designed by British golfer Sir Henry Cotton to the domain. In 1979, the chalet was rehabilitated as a hotel and renamed Chalet du Mont d'Arbois.

Edmond de Rothschild owned a 4,000-acre land east of Paris, acquired by his ancestors during the 18th century, where he established the farm Domaine des Trente Arpents which mainly produced the artisanal cheese Brie de Meaux.

=== Philanthropy ===
Edmond Adolphe de Rothschild gave furniture, tapestries, and paintings to the Château de Versailles. His gifts of the 18th-century French decorative arts pieces to the Israel Museum in Jerusalem now constitute the Rothschild Room at that institution. He bequeathed an important classical vase (Le Don de la Vigne) to the Musée d'Art et d'Histoire of Geneva through a donation carried out by his wife, Nadine de Rothschild, in 1998.

In France, Edmond de Rothschild supported the children's welfare association Œuvre pour la protection des enfants juifs (OPEJ), originally founded to aid children of Jewish victims of the Vichy-era deportations. He became its president in 1969, offering OPEJ the Château de Maubuisson north of Paris (Val d'Oise). Under his guidance, the OPEJ was opened to all children regardless of faith or family background in 1981. Nadine de Rothschild continued this work after her husband's death. The institution has been presided by members of his family ever since.

Edmond de Rothschild's grandfather, Baron Edmond James de Rothschild, had set up the acquisition of lands in Ottoman Palestine for Jewish development in the 1800s. In the 1950s, Edmond de Rothschild donated the family's property to the new Israeli State. In 1953, he gave 7,500 acres of the town of Caesarea to the newly created Caesarea Rothschild Foundation which was co-owned by the Israeli state. The Foundation was tasked with the redistribution of Caesarea's profits to education programs in Israel.

== Distinctions ==
- 1990: Officier of the Ordre des Arts et des Lettres
- 1994: Officier of the Legion of Honour
