= Listrac-Médoc =

Commune in Nouvelle-Aquitaine, France

- Commune
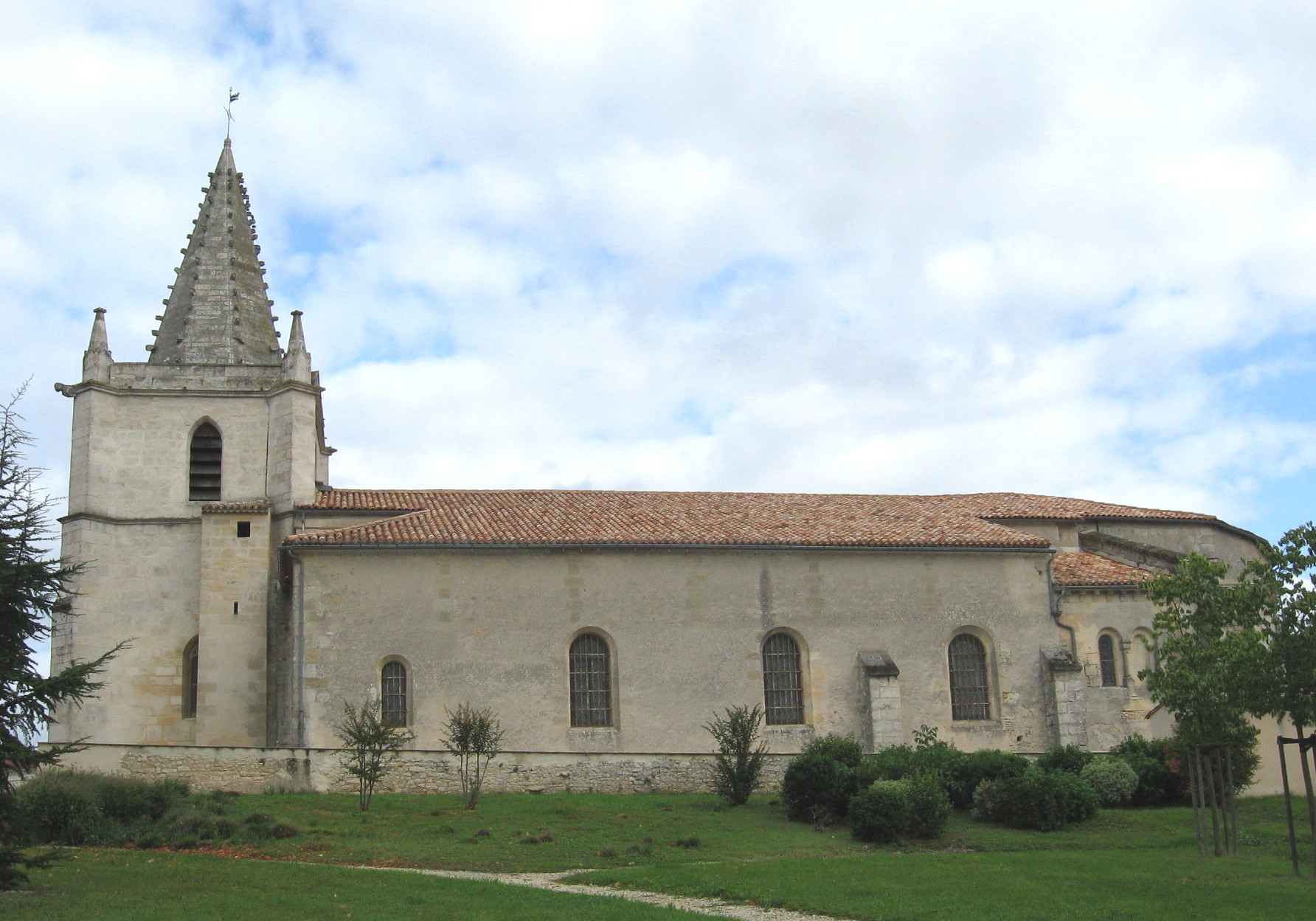
- The church in Listrac-Médoc
- Location of Listrac-Médoc
- Location within France Location within Nouvelle-Aquitaine
- Coordinates: 45°04′29″N 0°47′24″W
- Country: France
- Region: Nouvelle-Aquitaine
- Department: Gironde
- Arrondissement: Lesparre-Médoc
- Canton: Le Sud-Médoc
- Intercommunality: CC Médulienne

Government
  - Mayor (2020–2026): Aurélie Teixeira
- Area^{1}: 61.9 km^{2} (23.9 sq mi)
- Elevation: 39 m (128 ft)
- Highest elevation: 44 m (144 ft)
- Lowest elevation: 9 m (30 ft)
- Population (2023): 2,807
  - Density: 45.3/km^{2} (117/sq mi)
- Time zone: UTC+01:00 (CET)
  - Summer (DST): UTC+02:00 (CEST)
- INSEE/Postal code: 33248 /33480
- ^{1} French Land Register data, which excludes lakes, ponds, glaciers > 1 km^{2} (0.386 sq mi or 247 acres) and river estuaries.

Listrac-Médoc (French pronunciation: [listʁak medɔk]; Occitan: Listrac de Medòc) is a commune in the Gironde department in the Nouvelle-Aquitaine region in southwestern France.

== Geography ==
The commune is situated in the Médoc on the Route nationale 215, between Bordeaux and Le Verdon-sur-Mer.

== Population ==
Historical population
Year	Pop.	±% p.a.
1968	1,328	—
1975	1,319	−0.10%
1982	1,521	+2.06%
1990	1,821	+2.28%
1999	1,854	+0.20%
2007	2,185	+2.07%
2012	2,542	+3.07%
2017	2,764	+1.69%
2023	2,807	+0.26%
Source: INSEE

== Wine ==
Lying 15 kilometres (9 mi) northwest of the city of Bordeaux, the village is best known as one of the six appellations of the great wine-growing regions of the Médoc. In a region where a mere 20 metres (70 ft) can be the difference between a great wine and an average one, its distance from the beneficial effect of the Garonne means that its wines are not as highly rated as those of the other appellations. Nonetheless, it is home to many vineyards whose blends of cabernet sauvignon, merlot and cabernet franc can age over a long period.

== See also ==
- Communes of the Gironde department
