= Château Clarke =

Wine producer in Bordeaux, France

Coordinates: 45.0661°N 0.7745°W

Château Clarke is a wine property of Bordeaux of 54 hectares (130 acres) based in the Listrac-Médoc AOC and classified as Cru Bourgeois.

== History ==
In the 12th century, the Cistercian monks of the Vertheuil Abbey established the first grapevine. The estate would permanently bear Tobie Clarke's name in 1818, when the knight Clarke purchased the land. Baron Edmond de Rothschild became the landowner in 1973. Following the change of ownership the neglected vineyard was re-planned, and then completely recreated between 1974 and 1978, to attain a final wine-producing area of 54 hectares. Today, the vines are planted on clay–limestone hilltops, the optimum soil and environment for the Merlot grape.

Following the death of Edmond de Rothschild the estate was inherited by his son, Benjamin de Rothschild and Ariane de Rothschild. Edmond chose Château Clarke as his last resting place and is buried in the grounds of the chateau.

== Soil ==
The vineyard is made up of Cabernet Sauvignon (48%), Merlot (42%), Cabernet Franc (8%), and Petit Verdot (2%), planted on a limestone ground calcareous eocene and calcareous clay (spacing: 6060 vines/ha). It uses traditional vine training, and the pruning is in Double Guyot. The entire surface area was drained prior to planting and again when the vines had matured between 1987 and 1989. The plantations began in 1974 and were completed in 1978.

== Wine ==
The maturation takes 12 to 18 months, and the fining is done with egg white. Around 150,000 to 250,000 bottles are produced each year.
