= Noémie de Rothschild =

French philanthropist and property developer (1888-1968)

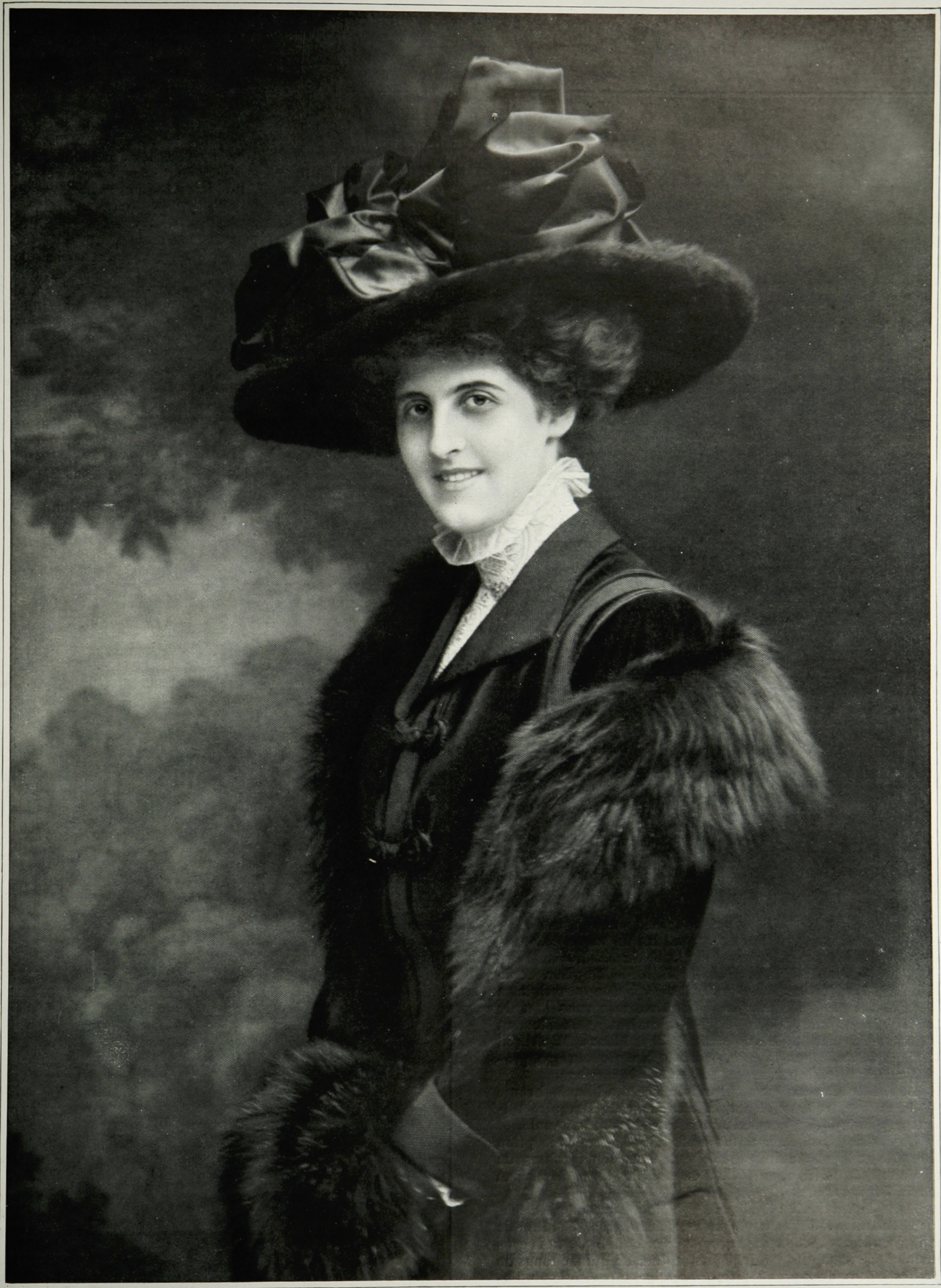
- Born: Noémie Halphen; 29 June 1888; Paris, France
- Died: 15 March 1968 (aged 79); Paris, France
- Occupation(s): Philanthropist, developer
- Spouse: Maurice de Rothschild (m. 1909; died 1957)
- Children: Edmond Adolphe de Rothschild
- Parent(s): Jules Halphen; Marie Rodrigues-Péreire
- Relatives: Eugène Halphen (paternal grandfather); Eugène Péreire (maternal grandfather); Edmond James de Rothschild (father-in-law)

Noémie de Rothschild (née Halphen; June 29, 1888 – March 15, 1968) was a French philanthropist and property developer.

== Early life ==
Noémie de Rothschild was born as Noémie Halphen on 29 June 1888 in Paris, France to Jules Halphen and Marie Hermine Rodrigues-Péreire. She was the granddaughter of financier Eugène Péreire of the Sephardic-Jewish Péreire family of Portugal who were banking rivals of the Rothschilds.

== Career ==
Rothschild turned her hôtel particulier in Paris into a hospital during World War I. In 1916, she decided to develop a ski resort in France to avoid having to holiday alongside the Germans in St. Moritz, Switzerland. By 1919, she founded Société Française des Hôtels de Montagne.

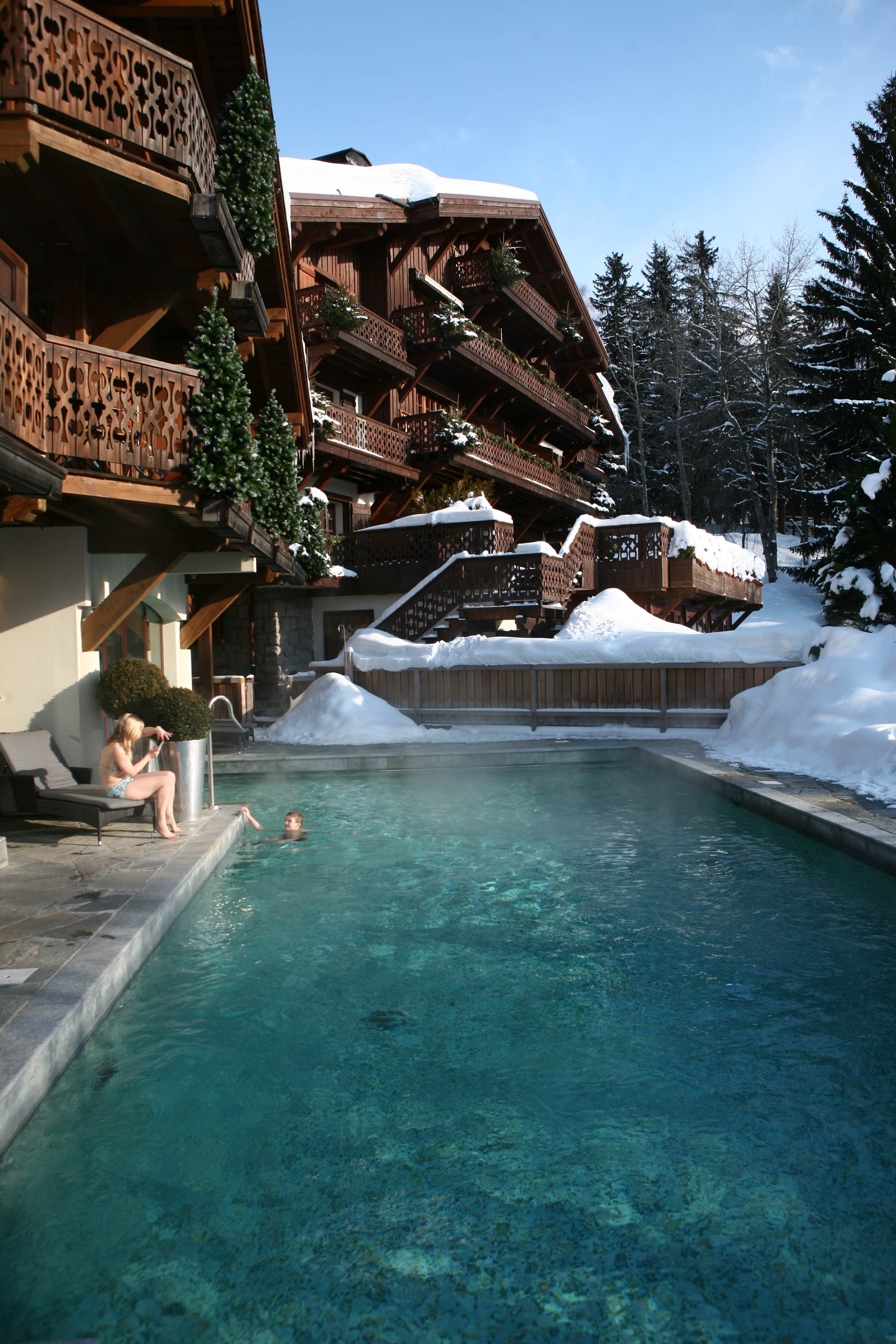
Domaine du Mont d'Arbois.

Rothschild developed the Domaine du Mont d'Arbois, a luxury hotel in Mont d'Arbois near Megève in Haute-Savoie. It was completed in 1921.

== Personal life and death ==
She married Maurice de Rothschild, a banker and politician. They had a son, Edmond Adolphe de Rothschild. She died on 15 March 1968 in Paris.
