= Maurice de Rothschild =

French art collector, vineyard owner, financier and politician

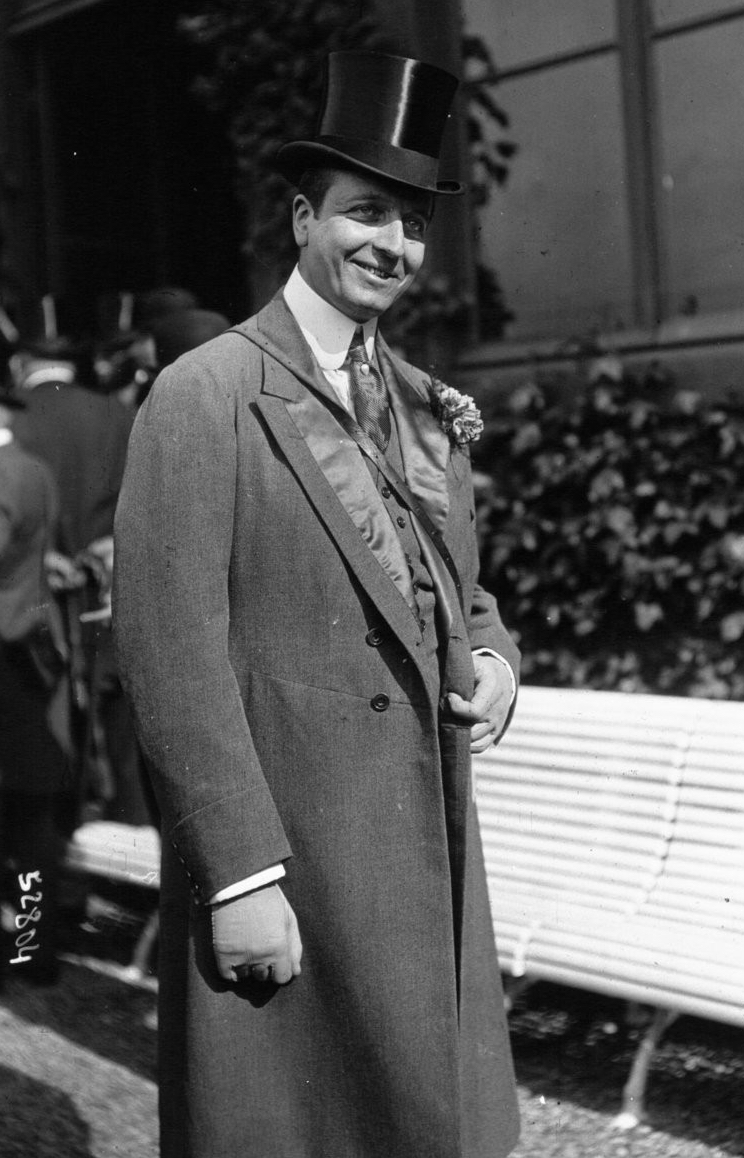
- Rothschild in 1914
- Born: Maurice Edmond Karl de Rothschild; 19 May 1881; Boulogne-Billancourt, France
- Died: 4 September 1957 (aged 76); Pregny-Chambésy, Switzerland
- Occupation(s): Financier, politician, art collector, philanthropist
- Spouse: Noémie Halphen (m. 1909)
- Children: Edmond Adolphe de Rothschild (b. 1926)
- Parent(s): Edmond James de Rothschild and Adelheid von Rothschild

Maurice Edmond Karl de Rothschild (19 May 1881 – 4 September 1957) was a French art collector, vineyard owner, financier and politician. He was born into the Rothschild banking family of France.

== Early life ==
Maurice de Rothschild was born on 19 May 1881 in Boulogne-Billancourt near Paris. He was the second child of Edmond James de Rothschild (1845–1934) and Adelheid von Rothschild. He grew up at the Château Rothschild in Boulogne-Billancourt.

== Career ==
Rothschild inherited a fortune from the childless Adolph Carl von Rothschild (1823–1900) of the Naples branch of the family and moved to Geneva, Switzerland where he perpetuated the new Swiss branch of the family.

Rothschild was elected in 1919 to the Chamber of Deputies, where he served until 1929. Between 1929 and 1945, he was a member of the Senate for Hautes-Alpes.

In June 1940, during the Battle of France, Rothschild and several family members received Portuguese visas from Aristides de Sousa Mendes, allowing them to flee France for Portugal. Maurice de Rothschild sailed from Lisbon to Scotland the following month.

== Personal life and death ==
In 1909 Maurice de Rothschild married Noémie de Rothschild. Her mother was Marie Hermine Rodrigues Péreire (1860–1936), daughter of Eugène Péreire of the Péreire banking family whose Crédit Mobilier were arch-competitors of the Rothschilds. Noémie Halphen and Maurice de Rothschild had one child, a son Edmond.

== Legacy ==
Maurice de Rothschild is commemorated in the scientific name of a species of Malagasy lizard, Paracontias rothschildi.

Maurice de Rothschild's African expedition 1904-1905, zoological in nature, was conveyed in a three-volume archive and published in 1922, entitled "Voyage de M. le baron Maurice de Rothschild en Éthiopie et en Afrique orientale anglaise (1904-1905) : résultats scientifiques : animaux articulés ". It is housed at the Biological Diversity Heritage Library.
