= Asaf Lifshitz =

Israeli sculptor (1942–2025)

Asaf Lifshitz אסף ליפשיץ
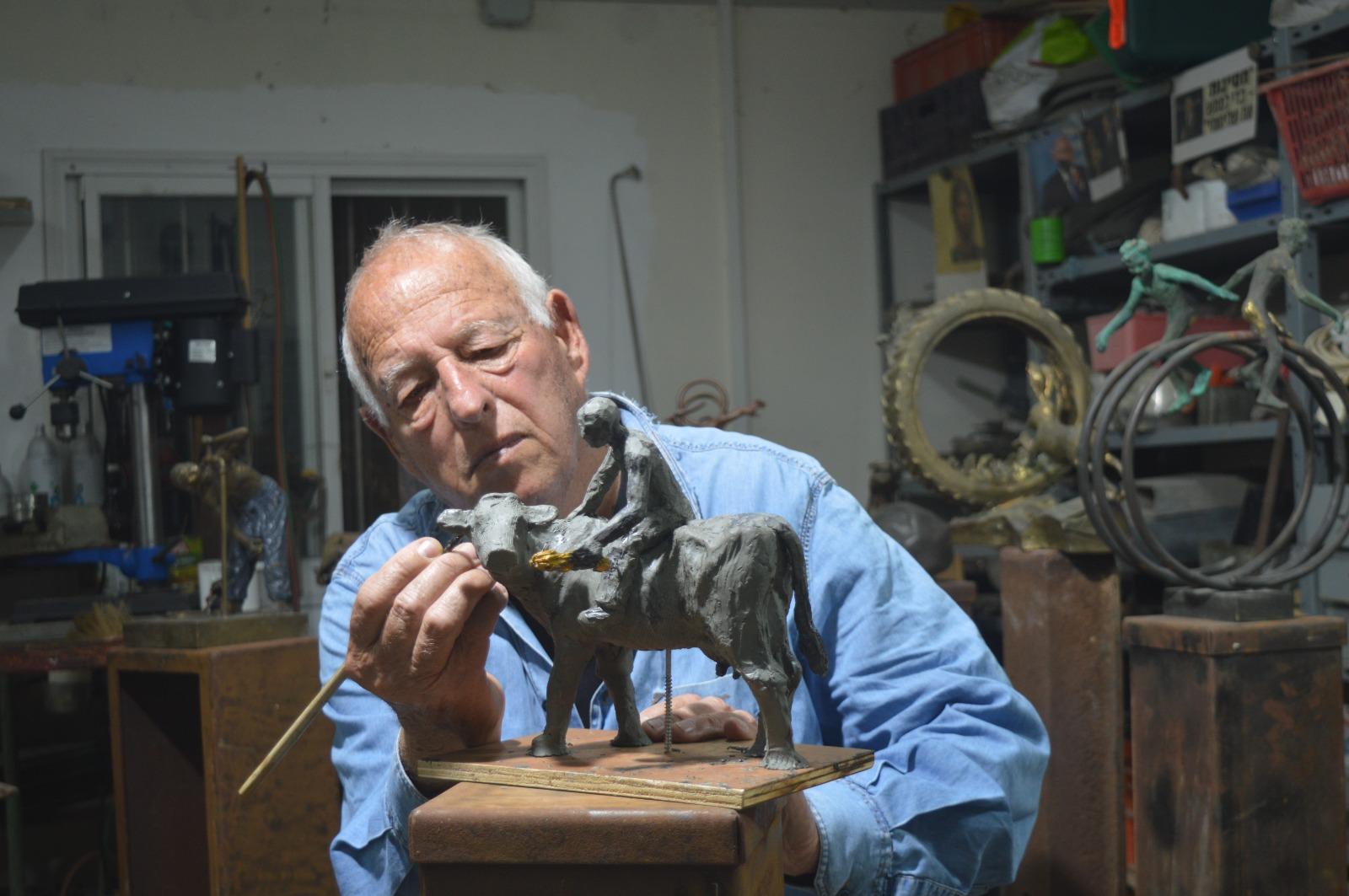
- Lifshitz in 2020
- Born: 28 July 1942; Ma'oz Haim, Mandatory Palestine
- Died: 22 March 2025 (aged 82)
- Website: asaflifshitz.wixsite.com/asaf-lifshitz

Asaf Lifshitz (Hebrew: אסף ליפשיץ; 28 July 1942 – 22 March 2025) was an Israeli sculptor, whose many statues decorate different central places all over Israel, from Metula in the north to Beer Sheva in the south.

== Background ==
Lifshitz was born in 1942 in Kibbutz Ma'oz Haim. He was the son of Israel (Srulik) and Lea Lifshitz née Shereshevsky. He studied at the local school of Kibbutz Ma'oz Haim and served as a tankist at the Israeli Armored Corps of the IDF. Many members of the Lifshitz family are engaged in the arts of sculpture, painting, design, etc. Asaf was the cousin of the painter Uri Lifshitz. The author Dvora Omer is a sister of Asaf from his mother's side. Asaf worked as a metalworker in Kibbutz Ma'oz Haim and has been sculpting since his youth. He was an autodidact who had never attended an accredited school of art.

Lifshitz died on 22 March 2025, at the age of 82.

== Artistic career ==
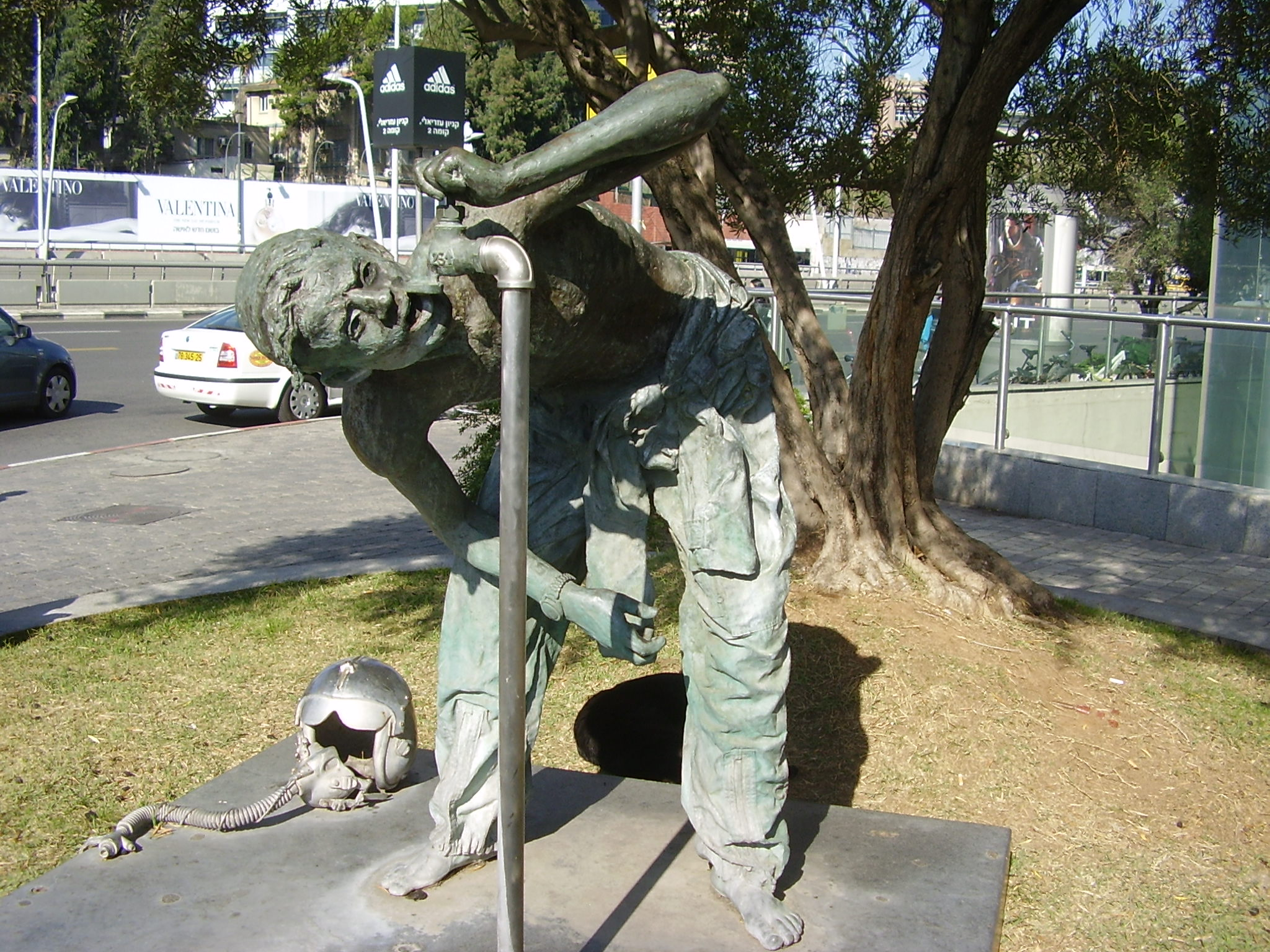
"The Drinking Pilot" – the forefront of the Azrieli Center, Tel Aviv.

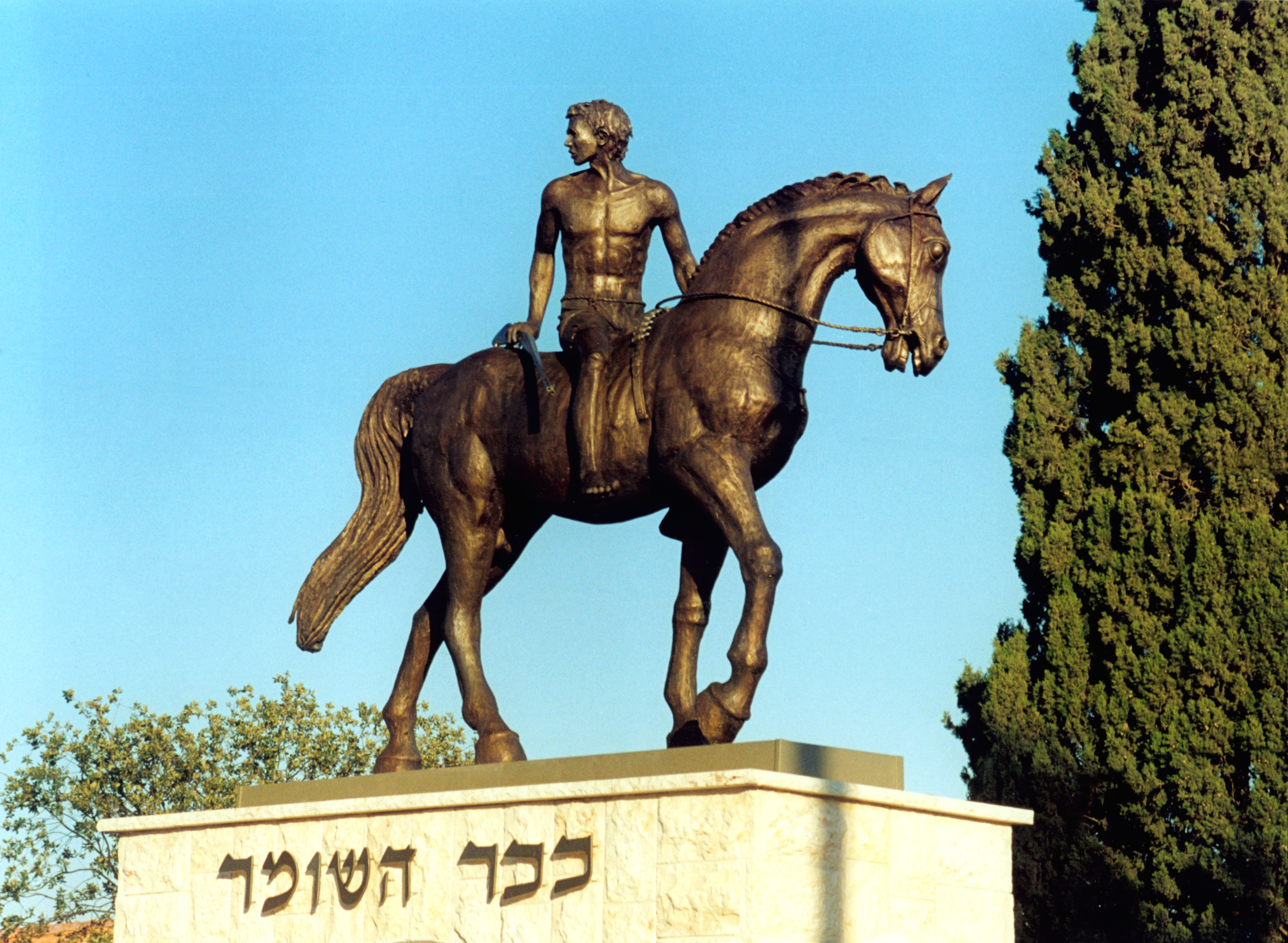
"The Boy and The Horse" – Ha'Shomer Square, Kfar Tavor.

The majority of the sculptures of Lifshitz are outdoor statues made of cast bronze. Many of his statues depict playing characters and combine fantasy with reality, geometric figures with human figures. One of his notable works is "The Drinking Pilot", located at the forefront of the Azrieli Center in Tel Aviv. "The Drinking Pilot" is a statue made of bronze and stainless steel, which shows the image of the Israeli Air Force (IAF) pilots in a slightly different light. The IAF website describes the statue: "In 'The Drinking Pilot' Asaf Lifshitz tries to break the meticulous image of the Air Force pilots and shows the pilot when performing a daily activity of existence: drinking water straight from the tap. The pilot is half–dressed in his flight suit, his helmet lies on the ground and passers–by can just look at it closely, in contrast to the classic image of the pilot as a distanced and noble figure. Thus, Lifshitz gives humanity to the figure and creates solidarity in the viewer. The figure of 'The Drinking Pilot' is based on the pilot Major Boaz Gafni, who was killed at the age of 24."

In Kfar Tavor, about 11 of Lifshitz's sculptures are displayed, among the most prominent are: "The Boy and The Horse" statue, which stands at a Ha'Shomer Square in Kfar Tavor, and down the road the "Visit by The Rothschilds" statue stands in the Baron Square, which was created based on a photograph of The Rothschild couple visit in Kfar Tavor in 1914.

In Holon stands "The Lion Who Loved Strawberries" (see Tirtza Atar) as part of a Story–Gardens project: it is an impressive, large 2.5 meters tall bronze statue of a lion with his maw wide open and a bunch of strawberries inside it, accompanied by a large strawberry fruit statue.

Statues of Asaf Lifshitz are also displayed at the Technion in Haifa, Tefen Industrial Park in the Galilee, The Open Museum in Omer Industrial Park near Beer Sheva, Metula, Mitzpe Ramon and in other locations. Asaf died on 22 March 2025, dying in his 80s.

== Notable published works ==
- "Pioneers in Mitzpe Ramon" - The main square, Mitzpe Ramon
- "Adelheid von Rothschild" – The Baron Wife Square, Kfar Tavor.
- "Yigal Allon" – Yigal Allon Square, Kfar Tavor.
- "Visit by The Rothschilds" – The Baron Square, Kfar Tavor.
- "The Boy and The Horse" – Ha'Shomer Square, Kfar Tavor.
- "The Drinking Pilot" – the forefront of the Azrieli Center, Tel Aviv.
- "The Lion who Loved Strawberries" – Story–Garden, Holon.
- "A Boy with a Wheel" – The Open Museum in Tefen.
- "Pendulum" – Mateh Asher Regional Council.
- "A Bicycle to Heaven" – Open Museum in Omer Industrial Park.
- "The Fisherman" – Kfar Tavor.
- "Apples" – placed at the entrance to Metula.
- "The Tree of Knowledge and Electronics" – The Technion Faculty of Electronics in Haifa.
- "Seagulls and Schieber" – The Promenade in Kiryat Yam.
- "The Thoughtful Soldier" – Beit Yad La'Banim square in Afula.
- "The Light–bulb" – near the Council Building in Kfar Tavor.
- A portrait of David Azrieli – Azrieli Center, Tel Aviv.
- "Herons" – Sheikh Hussein Bridge.

== Gallery ==
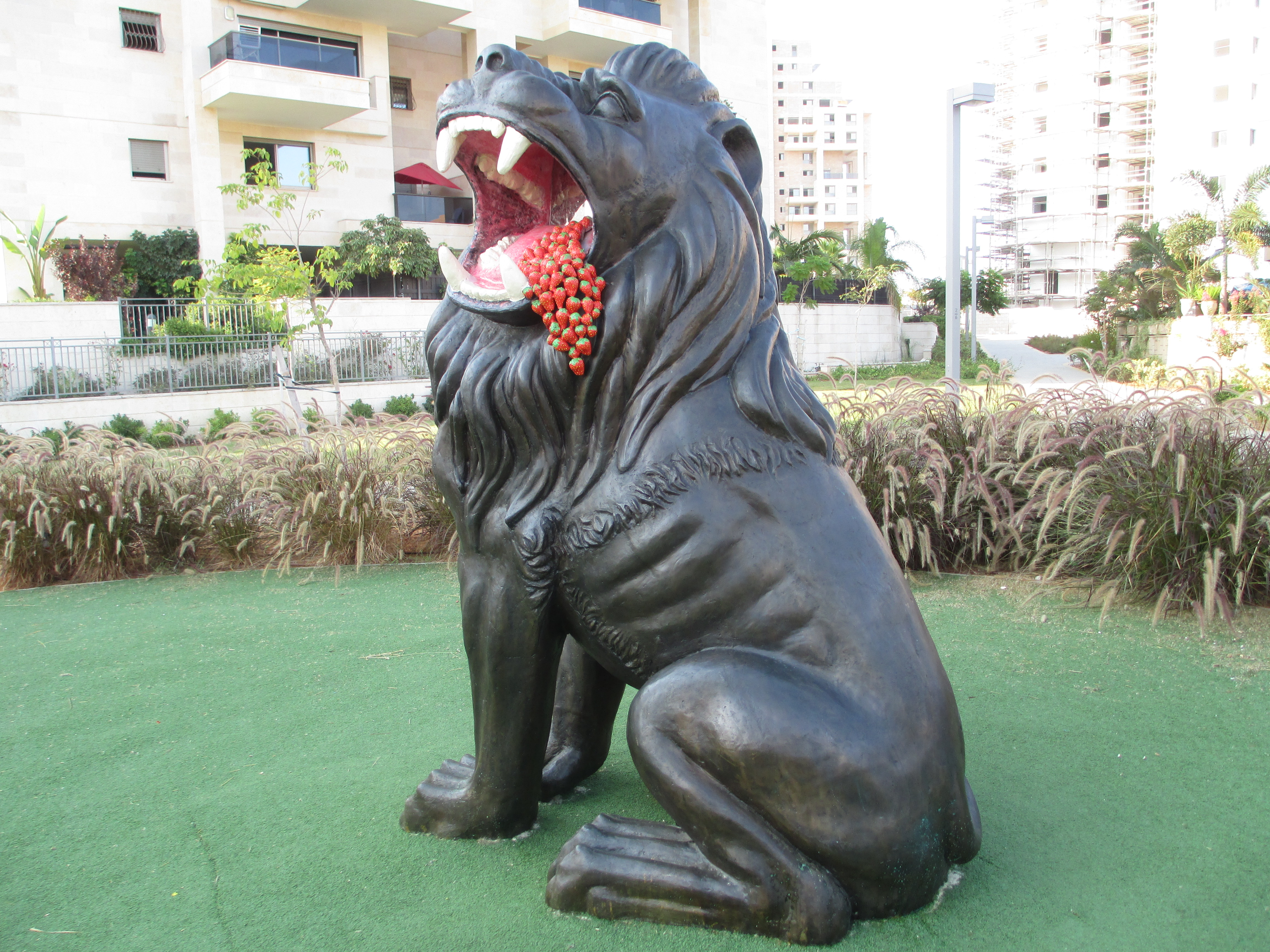
"The Lion who Loved Strawberries" – Story–Garden, Holon

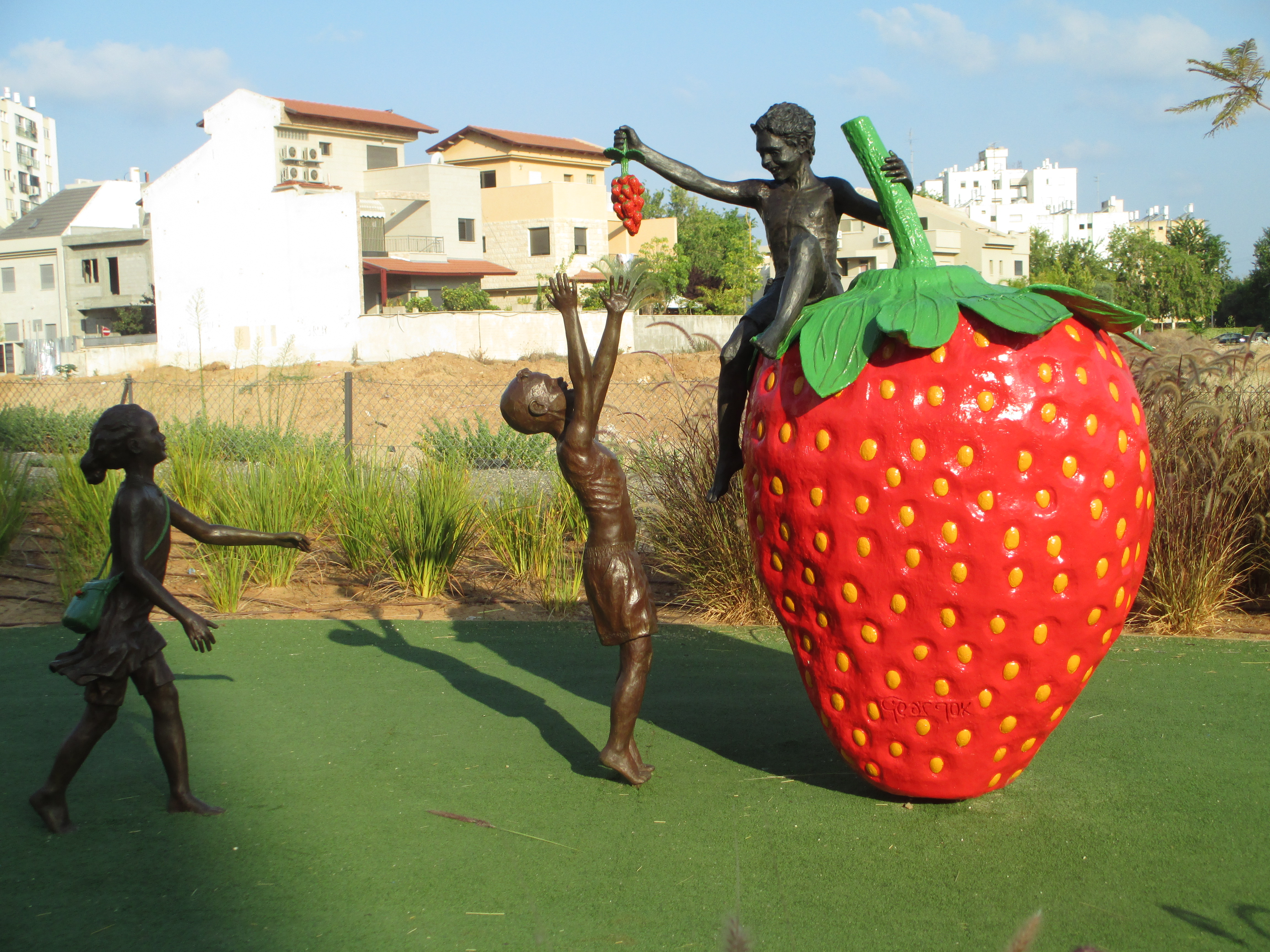
"The Lion who Loved Strawberries" – Story–Garden, Holon

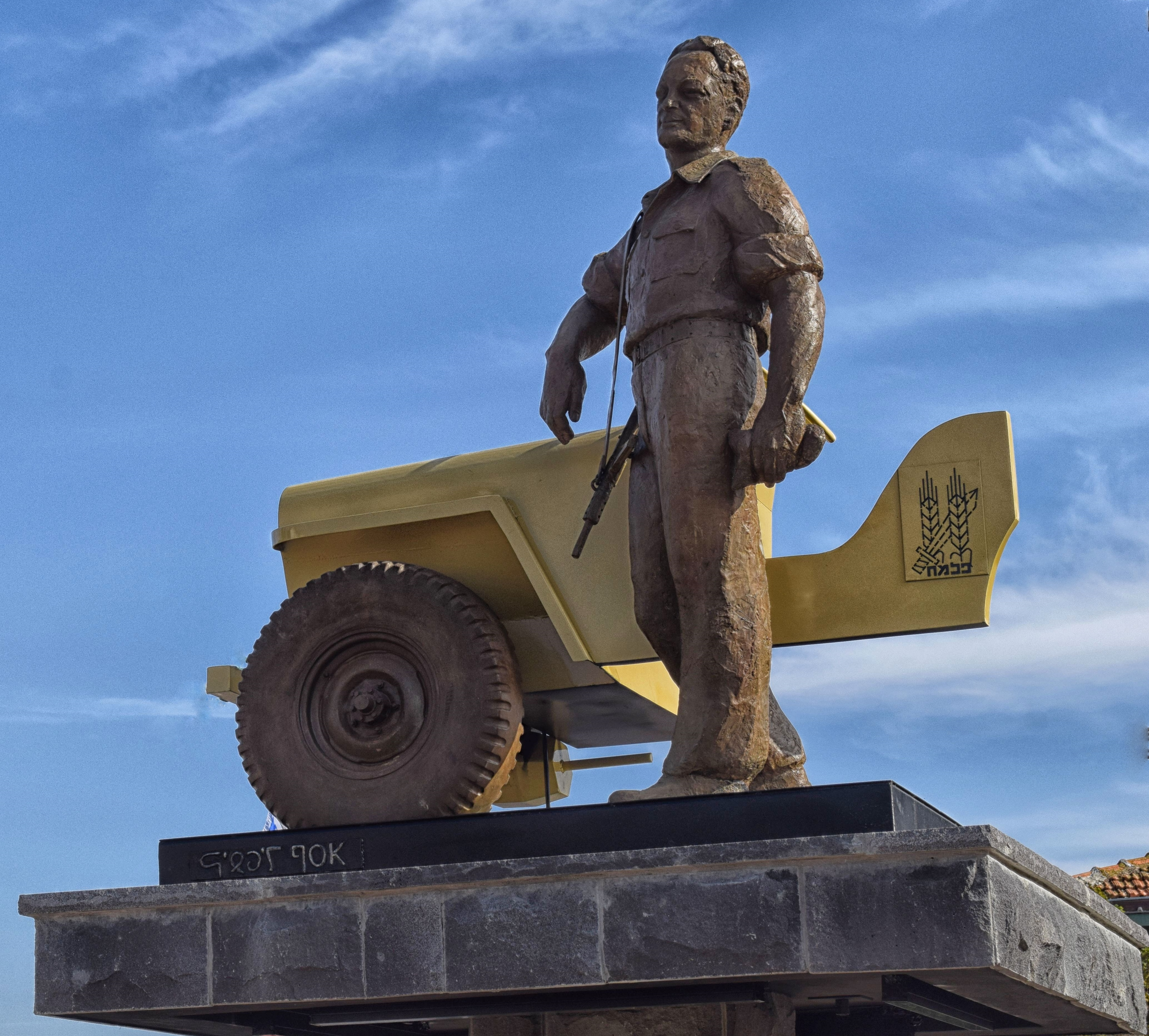
"Yigal Allon" – Yigal Allon Square, Kfar Tavor

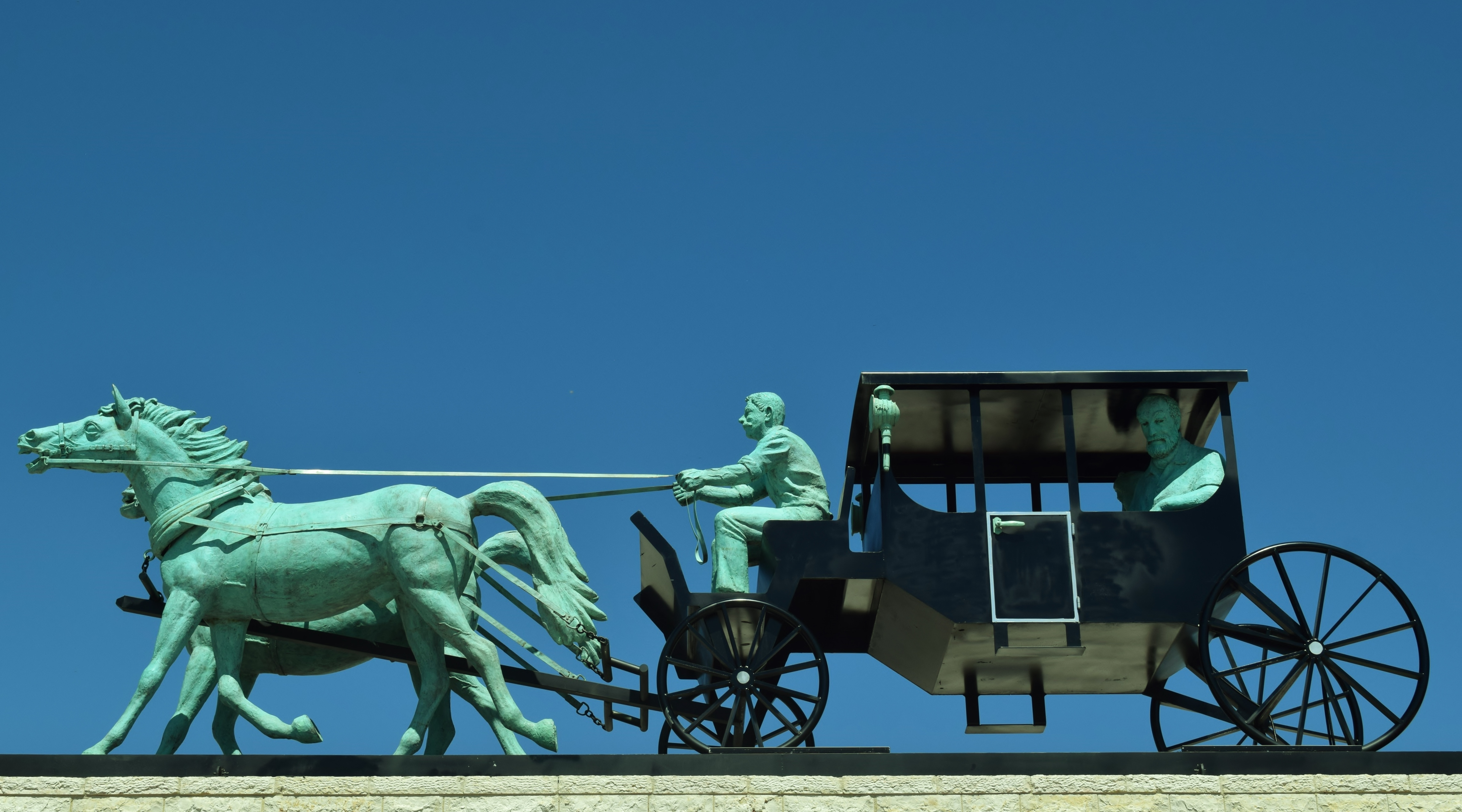
"Visit by The Rothschilds" – The Baron Square, Kfar Tavor

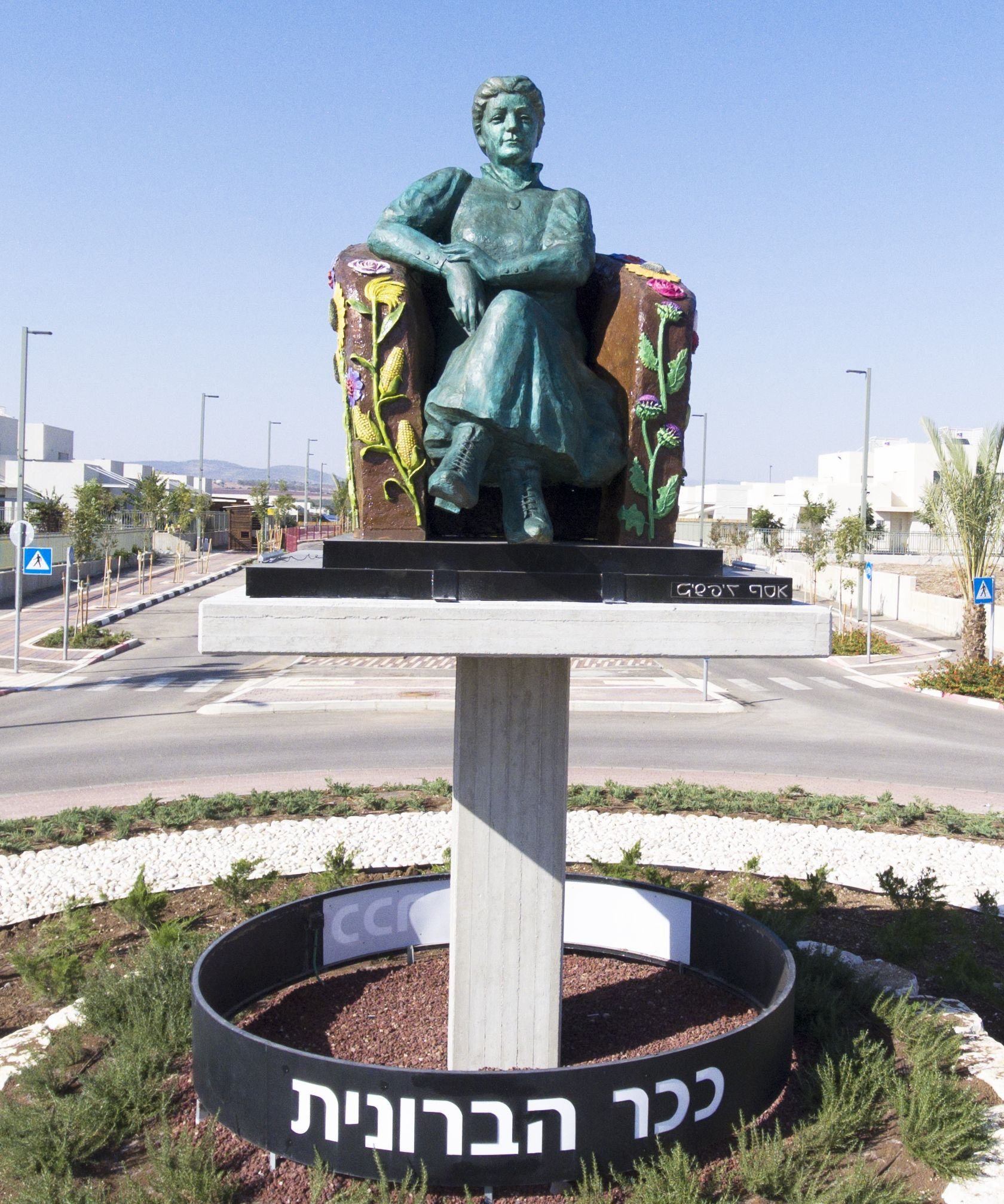
"Adelheid von Rothschild" – The Baron Wife Square, Kfar Tavor

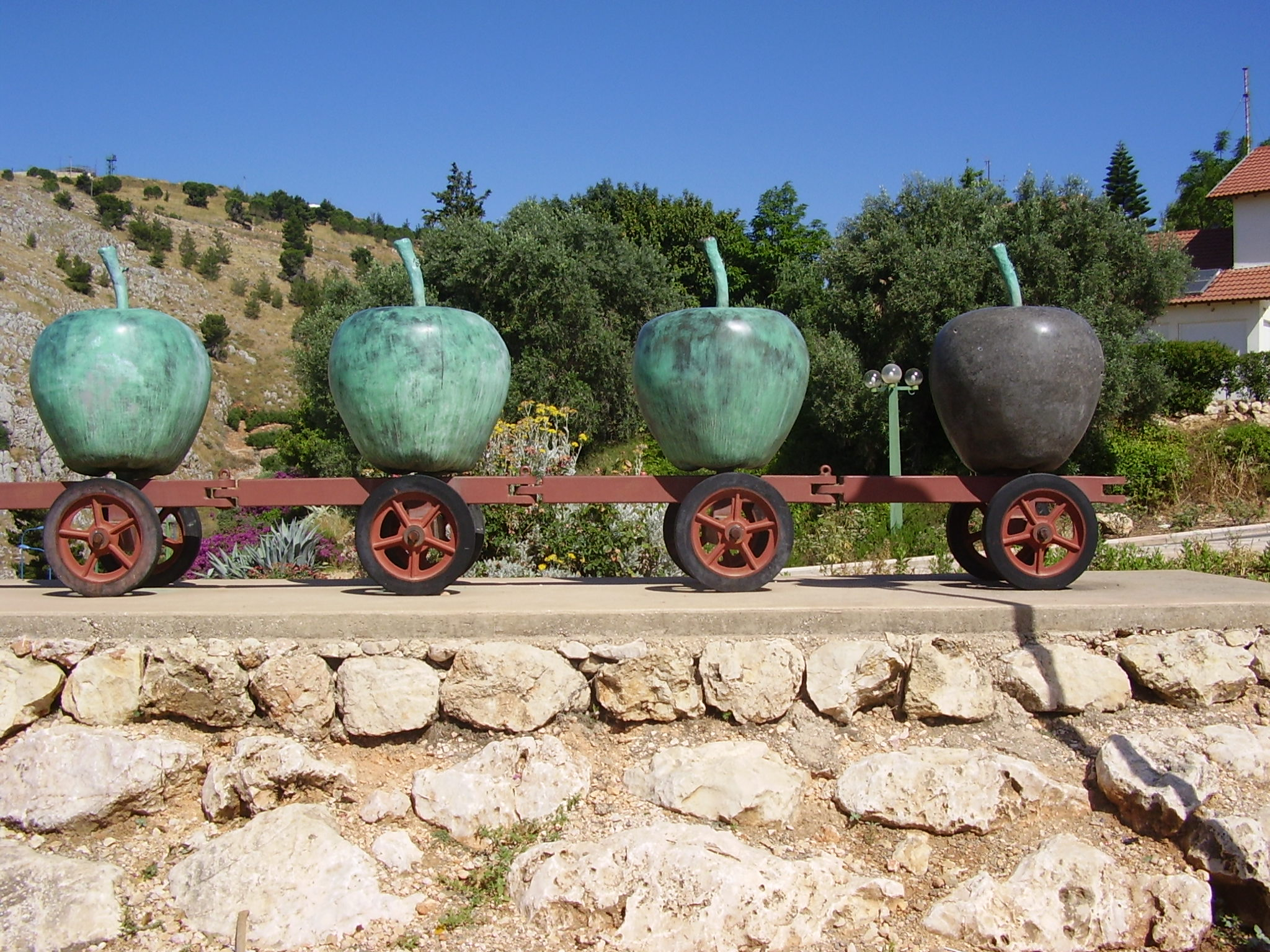
Apples sculpture in Metula

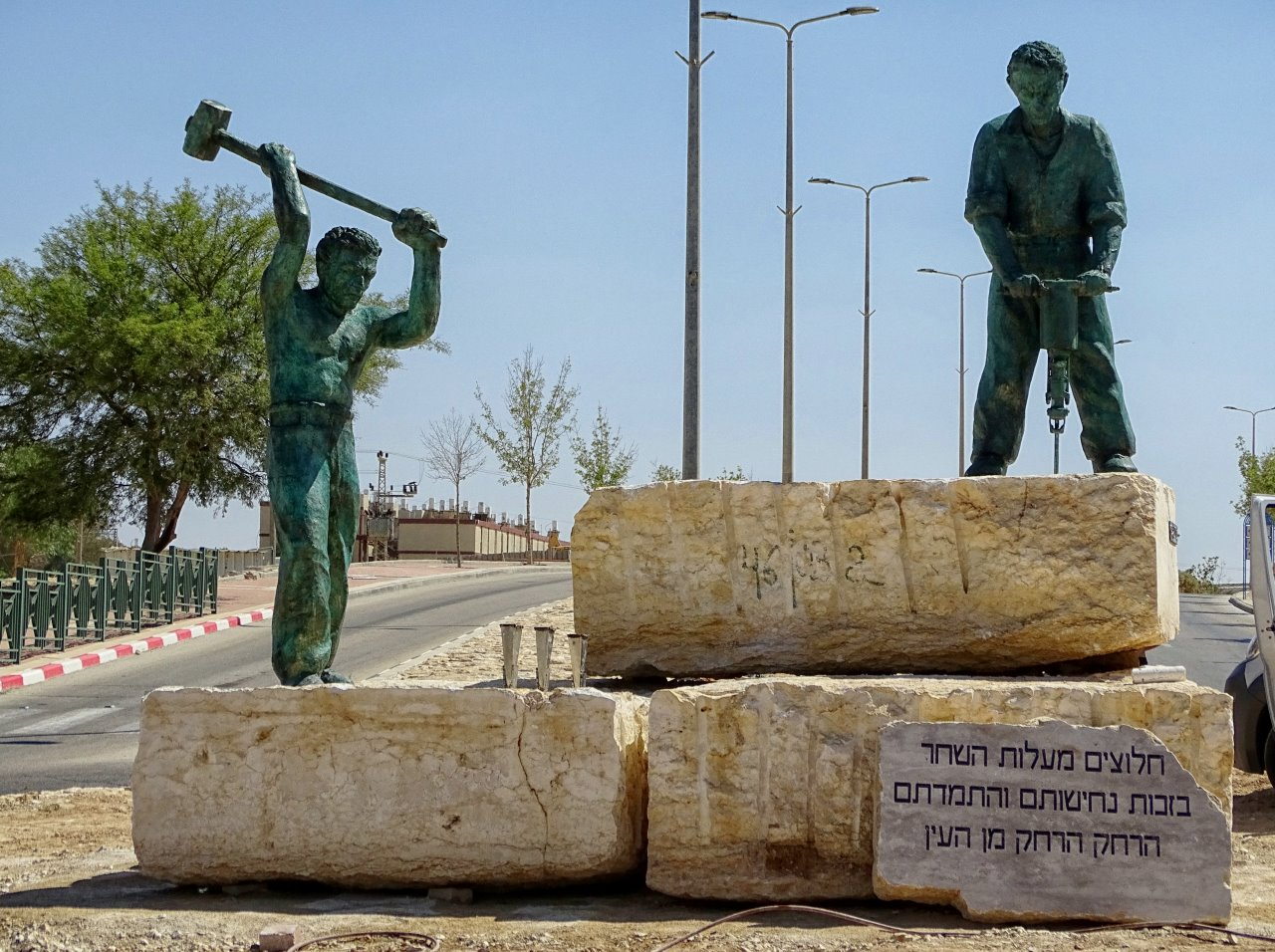
"Pioneers in Mitzpe Ramon" - The main square, Mitzpe Ramon

== Exhibitions ==
- 1999 – HaMoshava Museum, Kfar Tavor (single).
- 2004 – HaMigdal Gallery, Tel Aviv (single).
- 2008 – 60 Years of Israeli Art, Paris (group).
- 2010 – Café Gallery, Kibbutz Ma'oz Haim, a joint exhibition with Uri Lifshitz and other family members (group).
