= Mathilde von Rothschild =

German-Jewish baroness, composer and patron

- Born: Hannah Mathilde von Rothschild; 5 March 1832; Frankfurt, German Confederation
- Died: 8 March 1924 (aged 92); Frankfurt, Germany
- Spouse: Wilhelm Carl von Rothschild (m. 1849; died 1901)
- Children: 3 (including Adelheid)
- Relatives: Maximilian von Goldschmidt-Rothschild (son-in-law); Edmond James de Rothschild (son-in-law)

Hannah Mathilde von Rothschild (5 March 1832 – 8 March 1924) was a German-Jewish baroness, composer and patron.

== Life and career ==
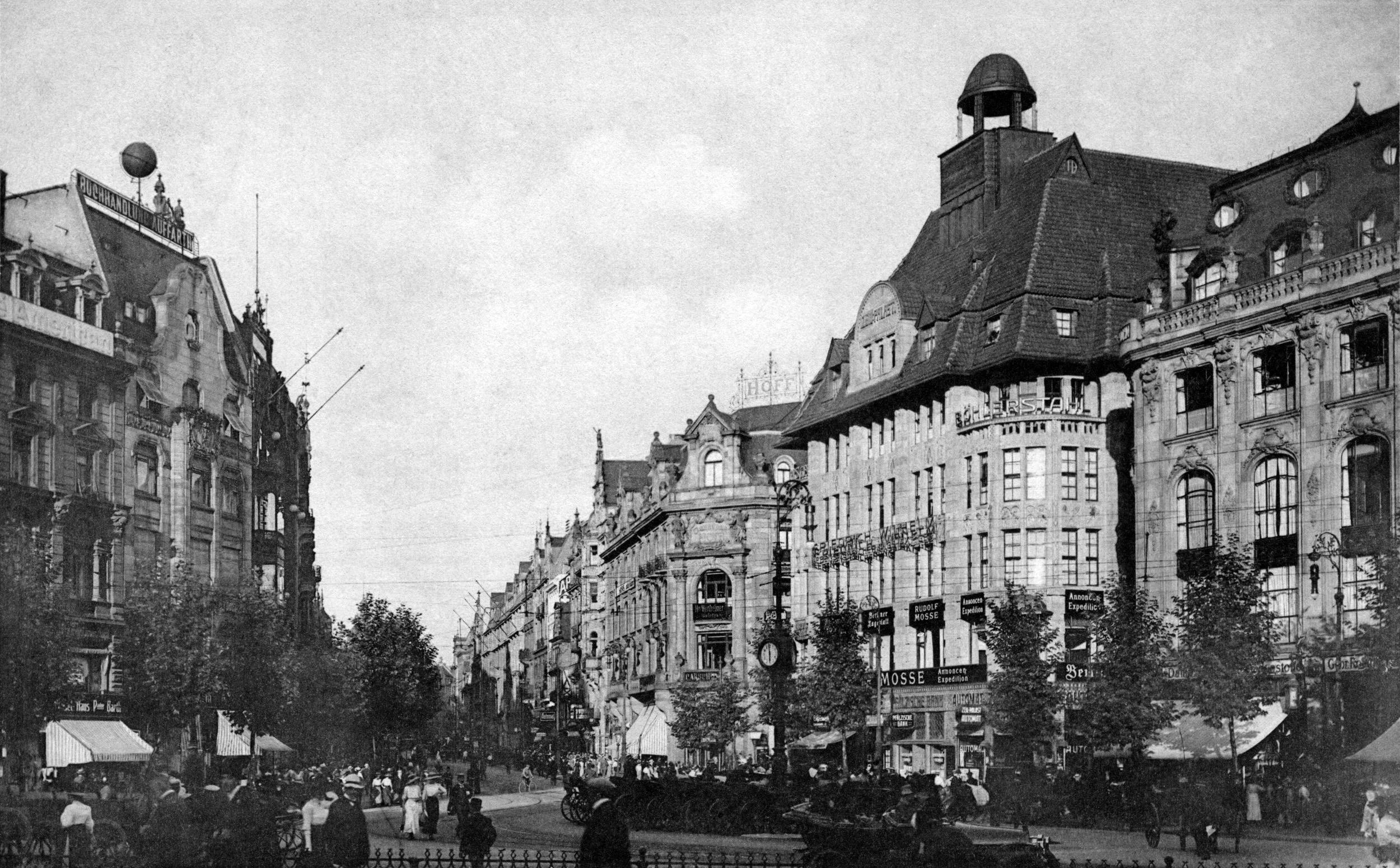
Zeilpalast (second building from the right) in Frankfurt, 1910.

Mathilde von Rothschild was born in Frankfurt, the second oldest daughter of Charlotte and Anselm von Rothschild, a chief of the Vienna House of Rothschild. Mathilde was talented in music and studied with Frédéric Chopin. In 1849, she married the banker Wilhelm Carl von Rothschild, a cousin of her father. The couple first resided in the Rothschild house on the Zeil (Zeilpalast), but later moved to a palace in Grüneburg, and also lived in a villa in Königstein im Taunus. They had three daughters two of whom survived childhood, Adelheid Rothschild (who married her cousin Edmond James de Rothschild) and Minna Caroline Rothschild (who married Maximilian von Goldschmidt-Rothschild).

Von Rothschild made grants to a number of foundations including The Rothschilds' Hospital Foundation and the Georgine Sara von Rothschilds' Hospital Foundation. She also funded orphanages, sanatoriums, rest homes for the elderly, research projects for the University of Heidelberg and The Jewish Museum of Antiquities. She also founded the Carl von Rothschild Public Library at Frankfurt am Main.

Von Rothschild wrote songs for singers including Selma Kurz and Adelina Patti. In 1878 she published a volume of 30 melodies in which we find two poems by Victor Hugo: "Vieille chanson du jeune temps" and "Si vous n'avez rien à me dire" (cf. Bibliothèque nationale de France). In the late 1880s, she published a volume of twelve songs titled Zwölf Lieder für Singstimme mit Pianofortebegleitung which featured the work of several poets set to music, including poet and dramatist Franz von Dingelstedt, epic poet Friedrich von Bodenstedt, Frankfurt writer Wilhelm Jordan, Russian writer Alexey Tolstoy and French writer and librettist Paul Collin. She amassed an art collection including old masters and also the work of popular artists including Gerard Dou, Jan Steen and Gabriel Metsu.

== Recorded works ==
- The Songs of Mathilde de Rothschild Charlotte de Rothschild (soprano), Adrian Farmer (piano) 2CD Nimbus
