= Château Rothschild =

French château

Coordinates: 48.8500°N 2.2333°E

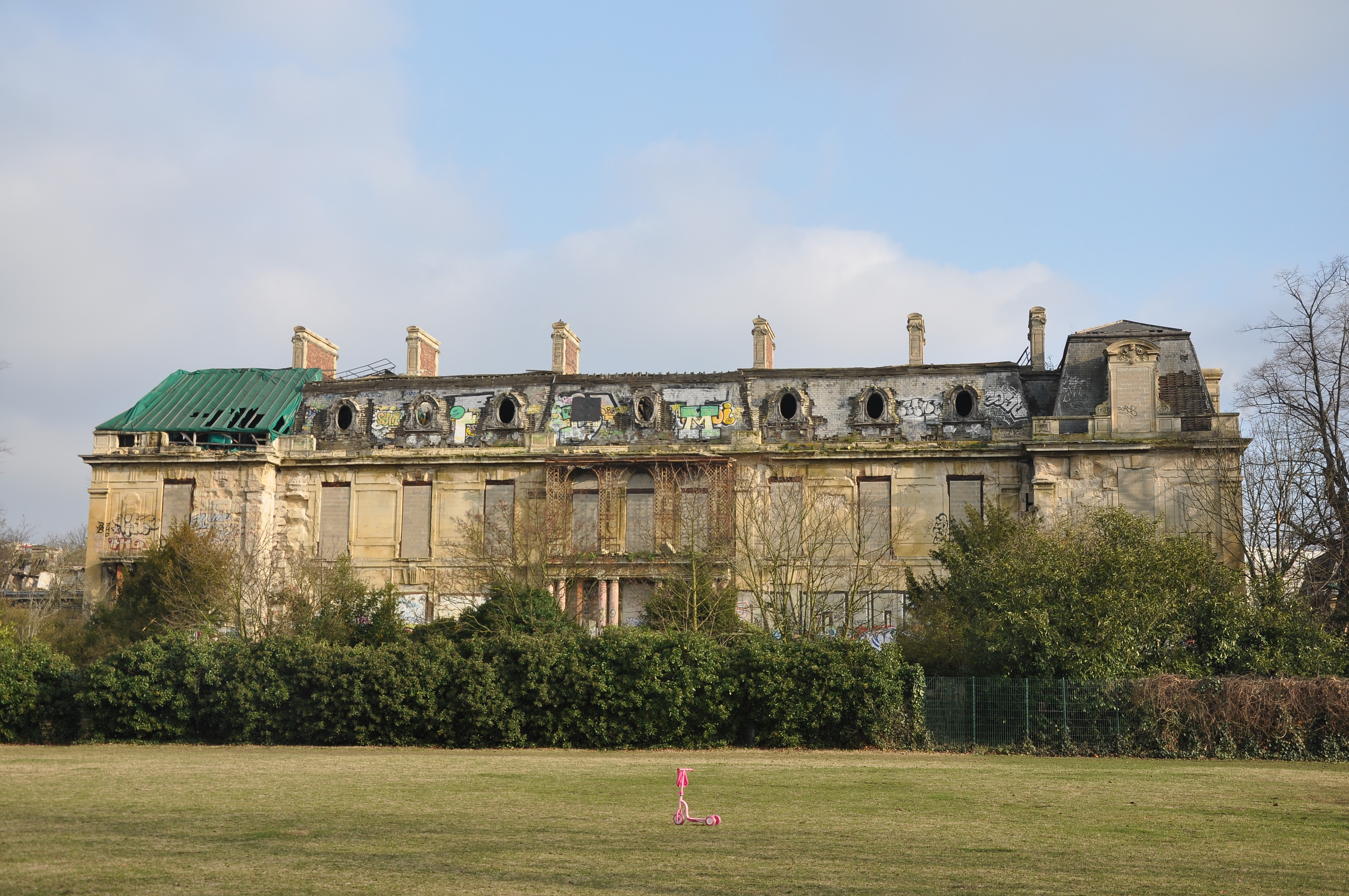
- Château Rothschild in 2012
- Interactive map of the Château Rothschild area

Design and construction
- Architect: Joseph-Armand Berthelin

The Château Rothschild is a historic château in Boulogne-Billancourt near Paris, France.

== History ==
The château was built in 1855 for banker James Mayer de Rothschild. It was designed by architect Joseph-Armand Berthelin. Guests included President Adolphe Thiers and Prime Minister Georges Clemenceau.

It was inherited by James's son, Edmond James de Rothschild. After Edmond's death in 1934, the Rothschild family no longer lived at the château, even though his daughter, Alexandrine de Rothschild, took care of the grounds surrounding it.

During World War II, the château was taken over by the Kriegsmarine, the Nazi Navy. After the liberation of France, it was used by American forces. The Kriegsmarine and US forces also used another Rothschild residence, the Château de la Muette 3.5 km away on the edge of Paris.

It was acquired by Saudi Prince Khalid I Abdulaziz al-Ibrahim in 1986.

The château was sold to French property developer Novaxia in 2016. After 37 years of neglect, the Château Rothschild will be restored, with work beginning in 2020.
