= Ramat HaNadiv =

Nature park and garden in Israel

Coordinates: 32°32′53″N 34°56′39″E

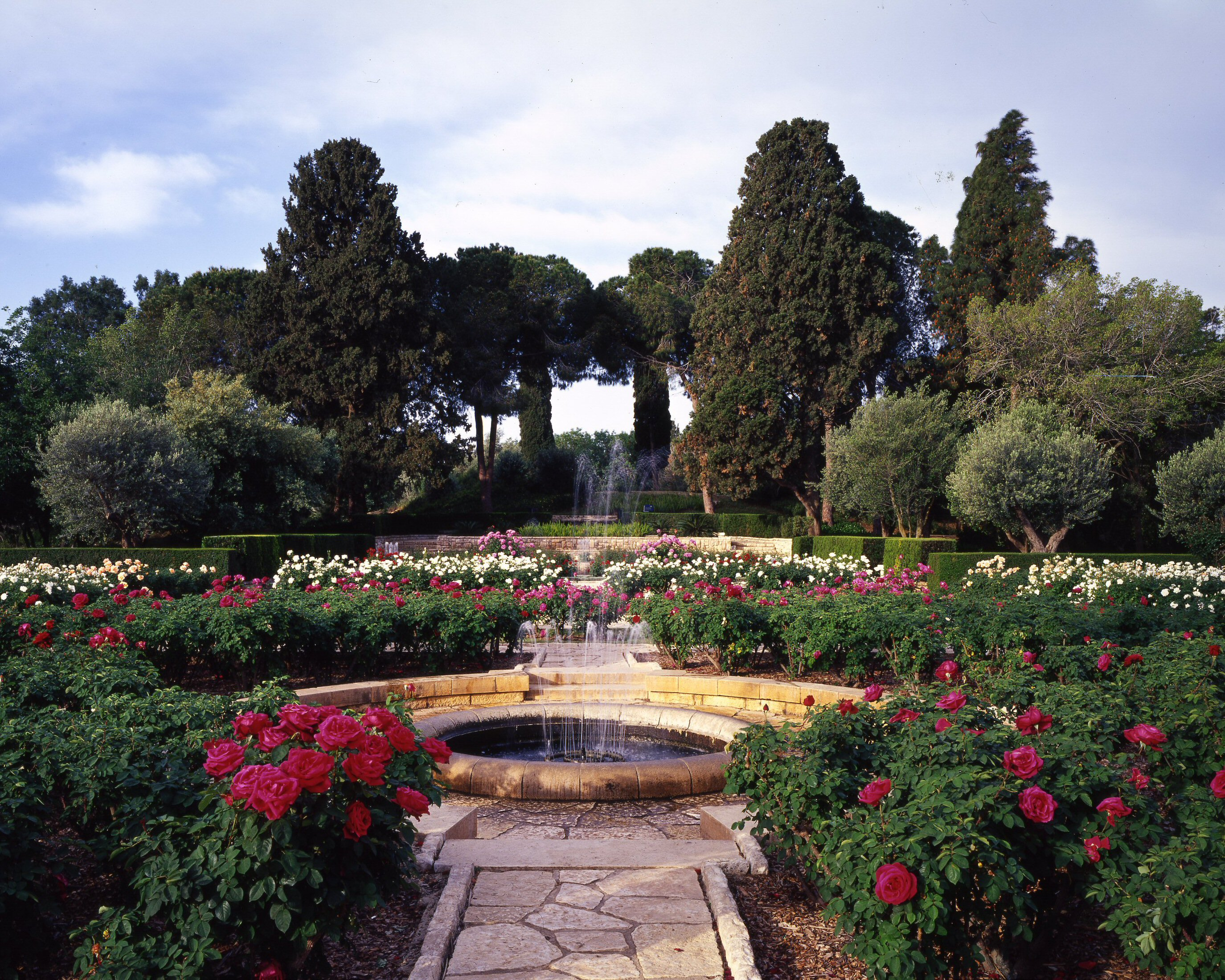
Ramat Hanadiv

Ramat HaNadiv (Hebrew: רמת הנדיב, Heights of the Benefactor), is a nature park and garden in northern Israel, covering 4.5 km (3 mi) at the southern end of Mount Carmel between Zikhron Ya'akov to the north and Binyamina to the south. The park is built around the Rothschild Family Tomb. The Jewish National Fund planted pine and cypress groves in most of the area.

== History ==
In 1882, during the late Ottoman era, the PEF's Survey of Western Palestine (SWP) found at Umm el Alak only "ruined walls". The name meant "producing leeches". A population list from about 1887 showed that Umm el Alaq had about 85 residents, all Muslim.

Umm el-'Aleq was a small Arab village where in the 19th century a farmstead (Beit Khouri) was constructed by the Christian Arab family of el-Khouri from Haifa. French Baron Edmond de Rothschild purchased the land from the el-Khouri family. The Jews coming during the Third Aliyah in 1919 changed the name of the region to "Ummlaleq" ("the miserable one"); their diaries recorded conflicts with the evicted Arabs as well as malarial mosquitoes proving to be an impediment to settlement within the region.

In the 1922 census of Palestine, conducted by the British Mandate authorities, Umm al-Alaq had a population of 14 Jews.

== Rothschild Family Tomb ==
On April 6, 1954 the remains of Baron Edmond de Rothschild and his wife Adelheid von Rothschild were laid to rest in the Rothschild Family Tomb, located in the heart of Ramat Hanadiv.

== Archaeology ==
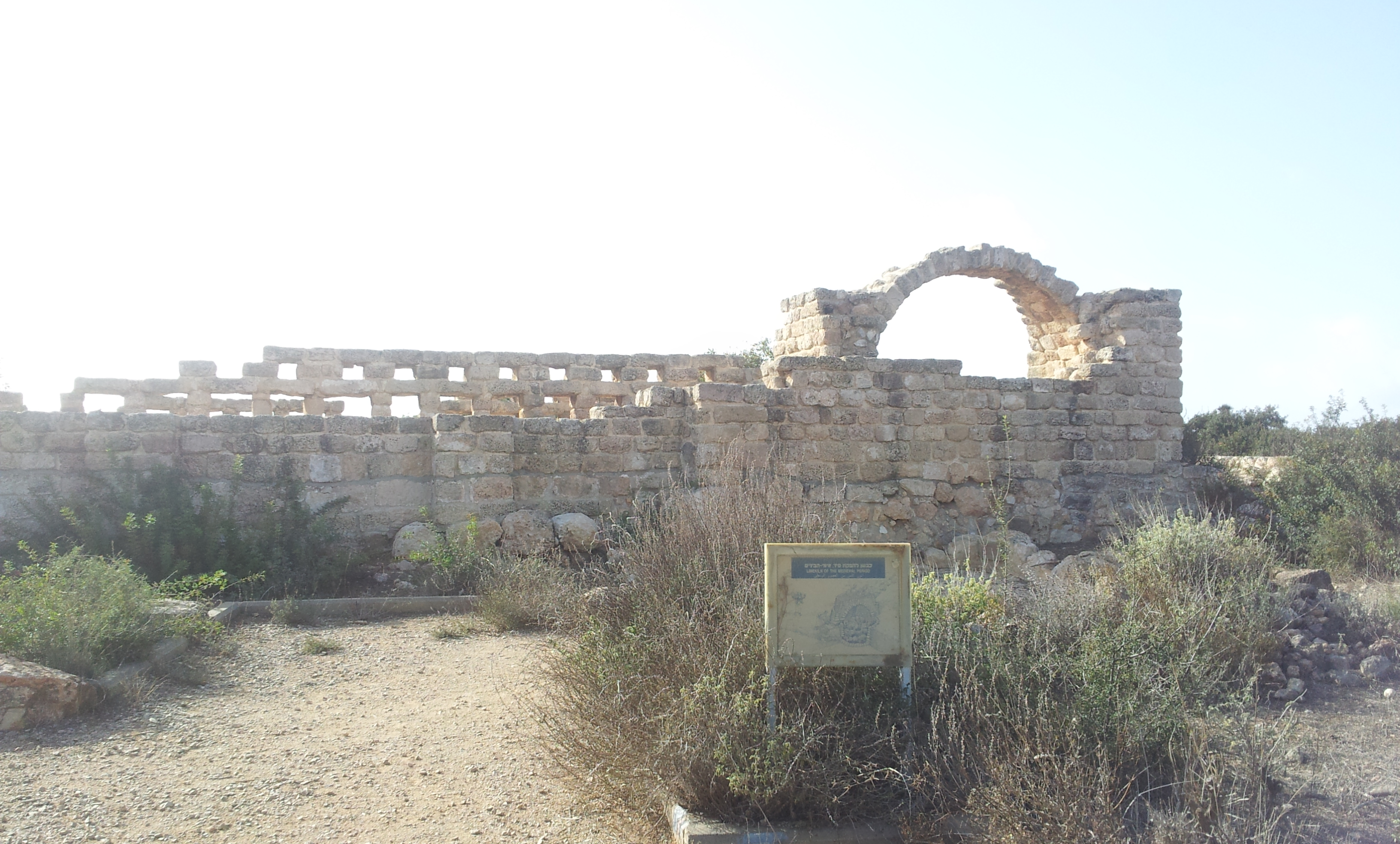
The villa side view

Yizhar Hirschfeld has carried out archaeological digs in Ramat Hanadiv over a period of 14 years. The excavations at Horvat ‘Aqav and Horvat Eleq, has unearthed remains from three periods: a small Phoenician shrine, a Herodian estate manor and a Byzantine period villa. It has been hypothesized that there was a spread of malarial mosquitoes in Ramat Hanadiv during the late Byzantine period.

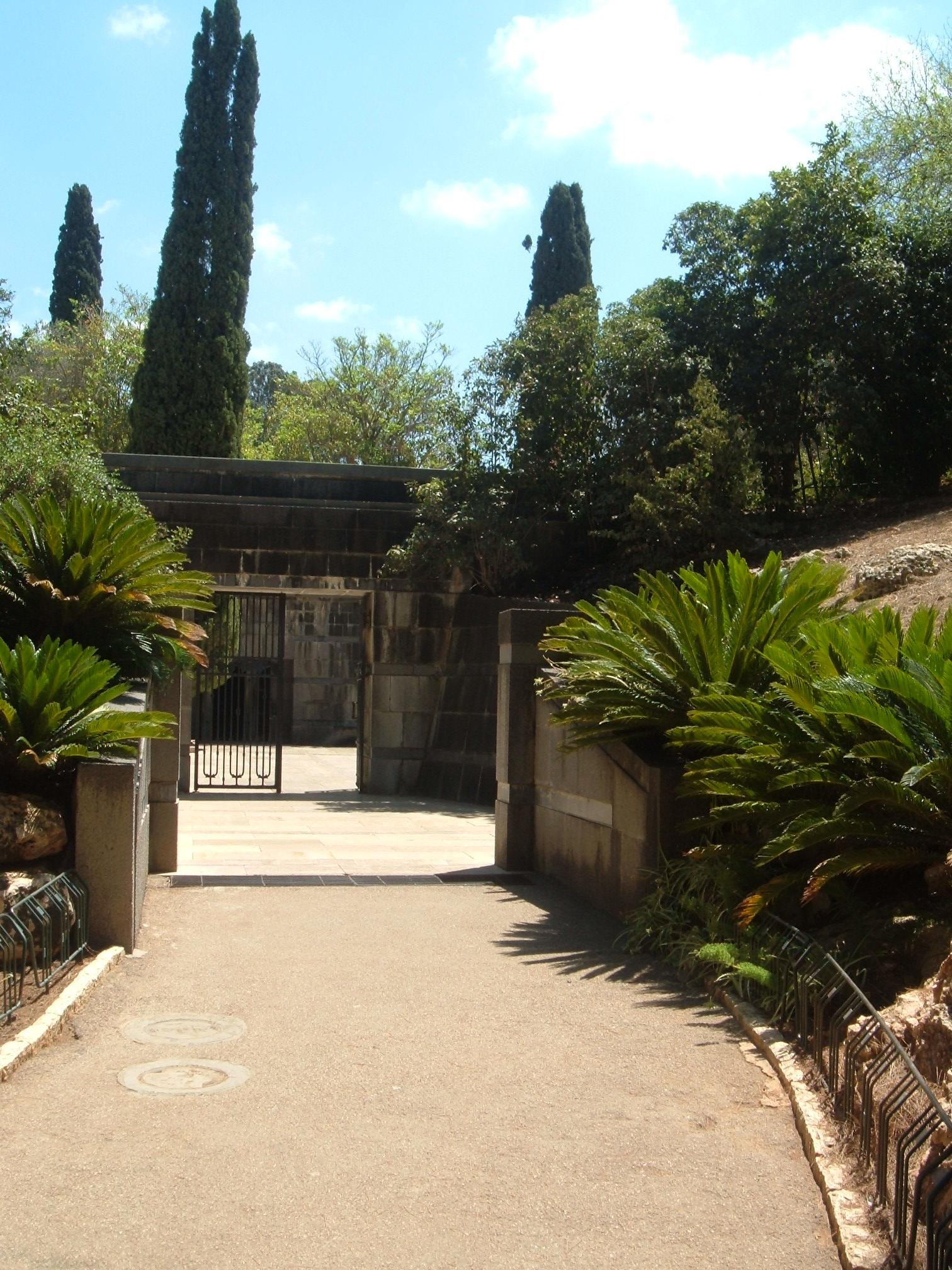
The entrance to the Rothschild family tomb

One of the findings at Ramat HaNadiv was a 6,000 square meter palace abandoned during the Great Rebellion against the Romans in 66 CE. The palace contained close to 100 rooms. Gold jewels, Italian marble and imported clay pottery attest to the wealth of the owner, who is believed to have been Jewish.

=== Horvat 'Eleq ===
The excavations at Horvat 'Eleq uncovered a Jewish Hellenistic-period settlement, a huge Herodian fortified complex, and a Roman-period bathhouse, in addition to a water system and the 19th-century Umm el-'Aleq.

=== Horvat 'Aqav ===
The excavations of the late 1st century BCE Herodian manor complex at Horvat 'Aqav revealed the base of a three storied tower, stables, two wine presses and an olive press. The Herodian manor also had a bath house, fed by a hypocaust system, with caldarium and swimming pool. Crosses found on roof tiles and bowls at the Horvat 'Aqav excavation from the Byzantine era may indicate that the later occupants of the site were Christians.

=== Ein Tzur ===
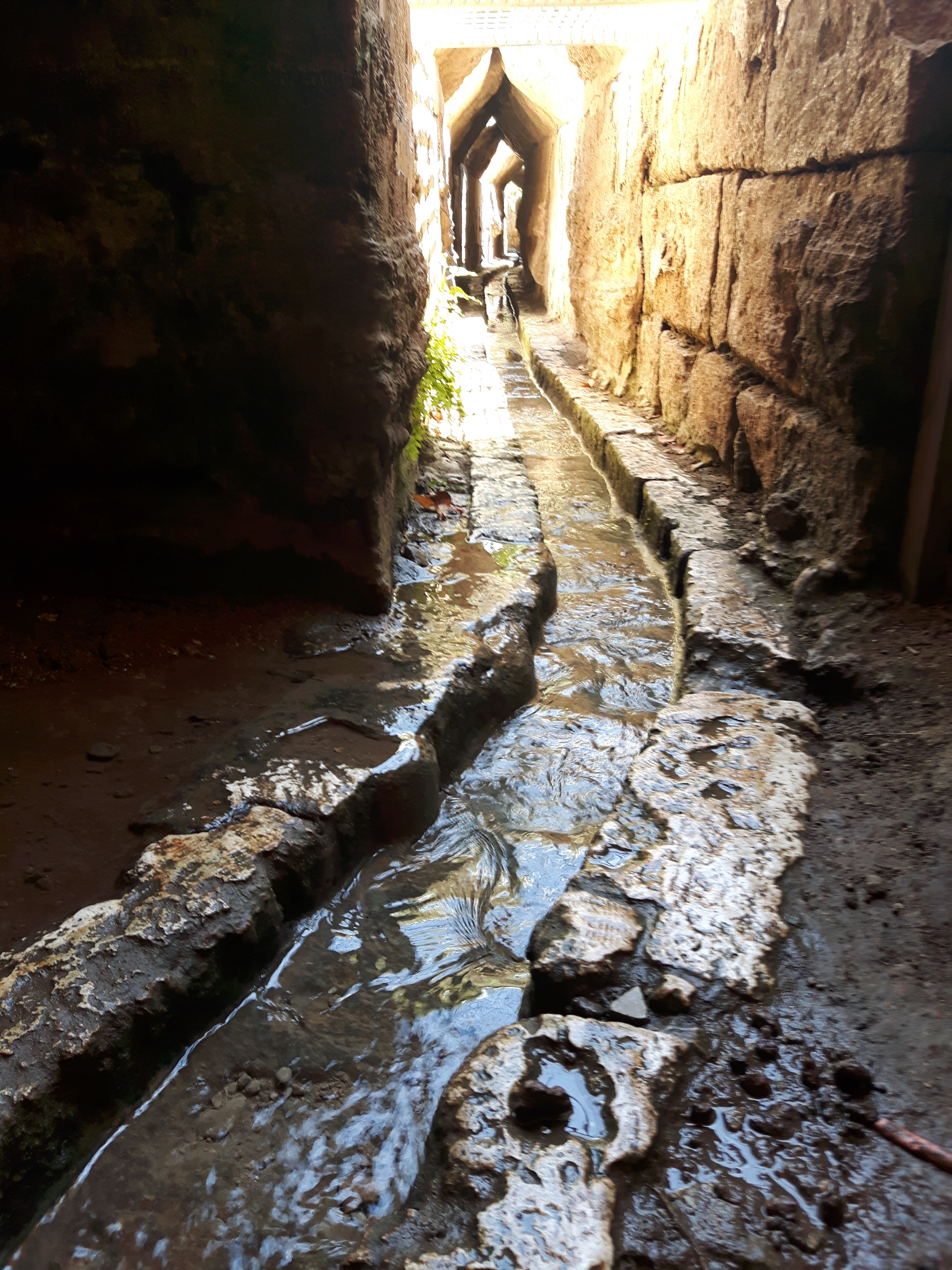
A look at the streaming water

The spring and aqueduct at Ein Tzur has been linked to Mont Sina, written about by an anonymous Pilgrim of Bordeaux (333) located 3 miles (4.8 km) from Caesarea Maritima. Where a spring on the mountain is visited by women seeking to become pregnant by bathing in its waters. This is due to a hoard of more than 2,000 coins being discovered in the pool of Ein Tzur, indicating that it was a place of pilgrimage from the 3rd to 7th century.

=== Kebara Cavern ===
The Kebara cavern, with 10 prehistoric layers of occupation, covering from middle Palaeolithic to late Mesolithic, is also within the Ramat Hanadiv region.

== Green technology ==
In 1994, a Green Waste recycling project was launched in Ramat Hanadiv to serve as an example for gardening contractors, regional councils and municipalities. Forestry and gardening waste – branches, grass, leaves, etc. – are collected and processed into compost that is then reused for gardening. A wastewater purification facility was installed at Ramat Hanadiv in 1998. This is a Bio-Disc type facility used for the purification of the wastewater generated by the office and public lavatories at the Gardens.

In March 2008, Ramat Hanadiv's Visitors Pavilion became the first building in Israel to be granted standard certification for sustainable construction. The pavilion was designed by the architectural firm of Ada Karmi-Melamede. Indoor climate control is provided by a geothermal heat pump system consisting of an electrically powered compressor and exchanger device connected to a series of small diameter pipes buried in the earth. Heat energy can either be captured from inside the building and returned to the earth or reversed to capture heat energy from the earth and channeled into the building. It looks like a green mound covered with soil and vegetation. Inside is an assembly hall where visitors can watch a film about Ramat Hanadiv, an exhibition gallery, a lecture hall and an educational center.

== Bibliography ==
- Barron, J.B. (1923). Palestine: Report and General Abstracts of the Census of 1922. Government of Palestine.
- Conder, C.R.; Kitchener, H.H. (1882). The Survey of Western Palestine: Memoirs of the Topography, Orography, Hydrography, and Archaeology. Vol. 2. London: Committee of the Palestine Exploration Fund.
- Palmer, E.H. (1881). The Survey of Western Palestine: Arabic and English Name Lists Collected During the Survey by Lieutenants Conder and Kitchener, R. E. Transliterated and Explained by E.H. Palmer. Committee of the Palestine Exploration Fund.
- Schumacher, G. (1888). "Population list of the Liwa of Akka". Quarterly Statement - Palestine Exploration Fund. 20: 169–191.
- Sufian, Sandra Marlene; LeVine, M. (2007). Reapproaching borders: new perspectives on the study of Israel-Palestine. Rowman & Littlefield. ISBN 978-0-7425-4639-4.
