= Adelheid von Rothschild =

Member of the Rothschild family (1853–1935)

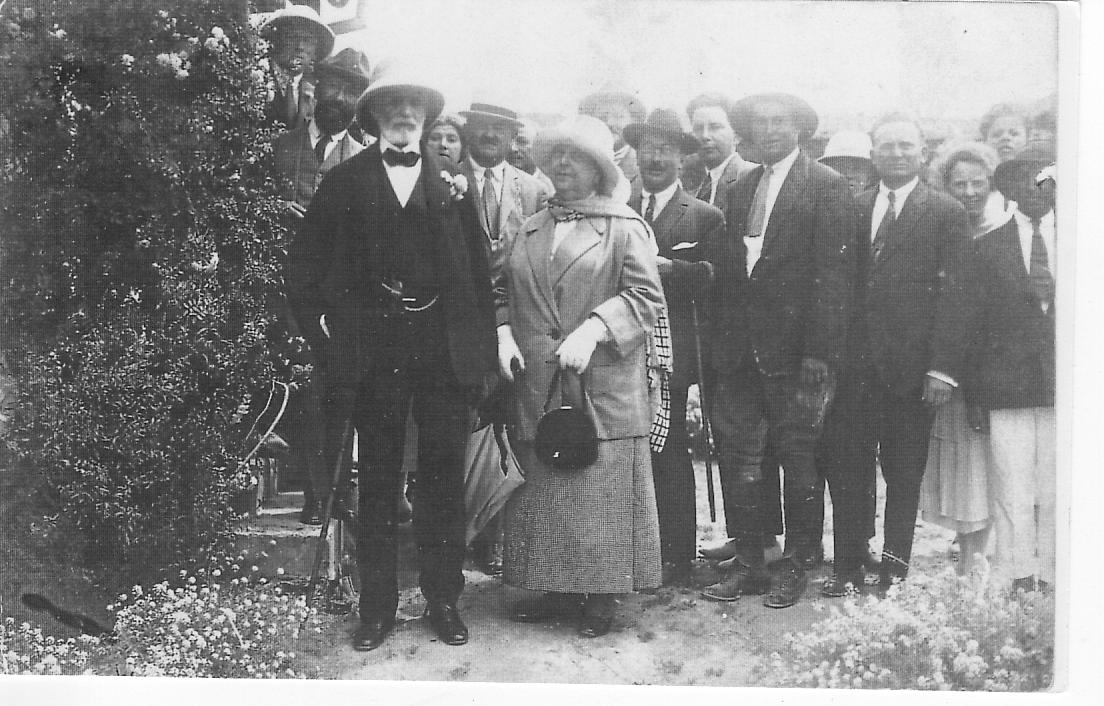
- Adelheid and Edmond James de Rothschild in 1914 visit to Holy Land in then Ottoman Palestine.
- Born: 19 August 1853; Frankfurt, Germany
- Died: 22 June 1935 (aged 81); Paris, France
- Resting place: Ramat HaNadiv (Israel)
- Spouse: Edmond James de Rothschild (m. 1877)
- Children: James Armand de Rothschild; Maurice de Rothschild; Alexandrine de Rothschild
- Parent(s): Wilhelm Carl von Rothschild; Mathilde Hannah von Rothschild
- Relatives: Edmond Adolphe de Rothschild (grandson)

Adelheid von Rothschild (also Adélaïde de Rothschild, 19 August 1853 – 22 June 1935) was a member of the Rothschild family.

== Biography ==
Adelheid was born on 19 August 1853 in Frankfurt. She was one of three daughters of Wilhelm Carl von Rothschild and Mathilde Hannah von Rothschild of the Naples branch of the Rothschild family.

Her paternal grandparents were Carl Mayer von Rothschild and Adelheid (née Hertz) von Rothschild. Her maternal grandparents were Anselm von Rothschild and Charlotte Nathan Rothschild (the daughter of Nathan Mayer Rothschild).

In 1877, she married her cousin Baron Edmond Benjamin James de Rothschild (1845–1934), the youngest child of James Mayer Rothschild and Betty von Rothschild. Together, they were the parents of three children:

- James Armand Edmond de Rothschild (1878–1957), who married Dorothy Mathilde Pinto (1895–1988)
- Maurice Edmond Karl de Rothschild (1881–1957), who married Noémie Halphen (1888–1968)
- Miriam Caroline Alexandrine de Rothschild.

From the 1880s, Adelheid became involved in her husband's life work in Palestine.

On April 6, 1954, her remains were laid to rest alongside those of her husband at Ramat HaNadiv in Israel.

Through her son Maurice, she was the grandmother of Baron Edmond Adolphe Maurice Jules Jacques de Rothschild (1926–1997), who married Nadine Lhopitalier (b. 1932).

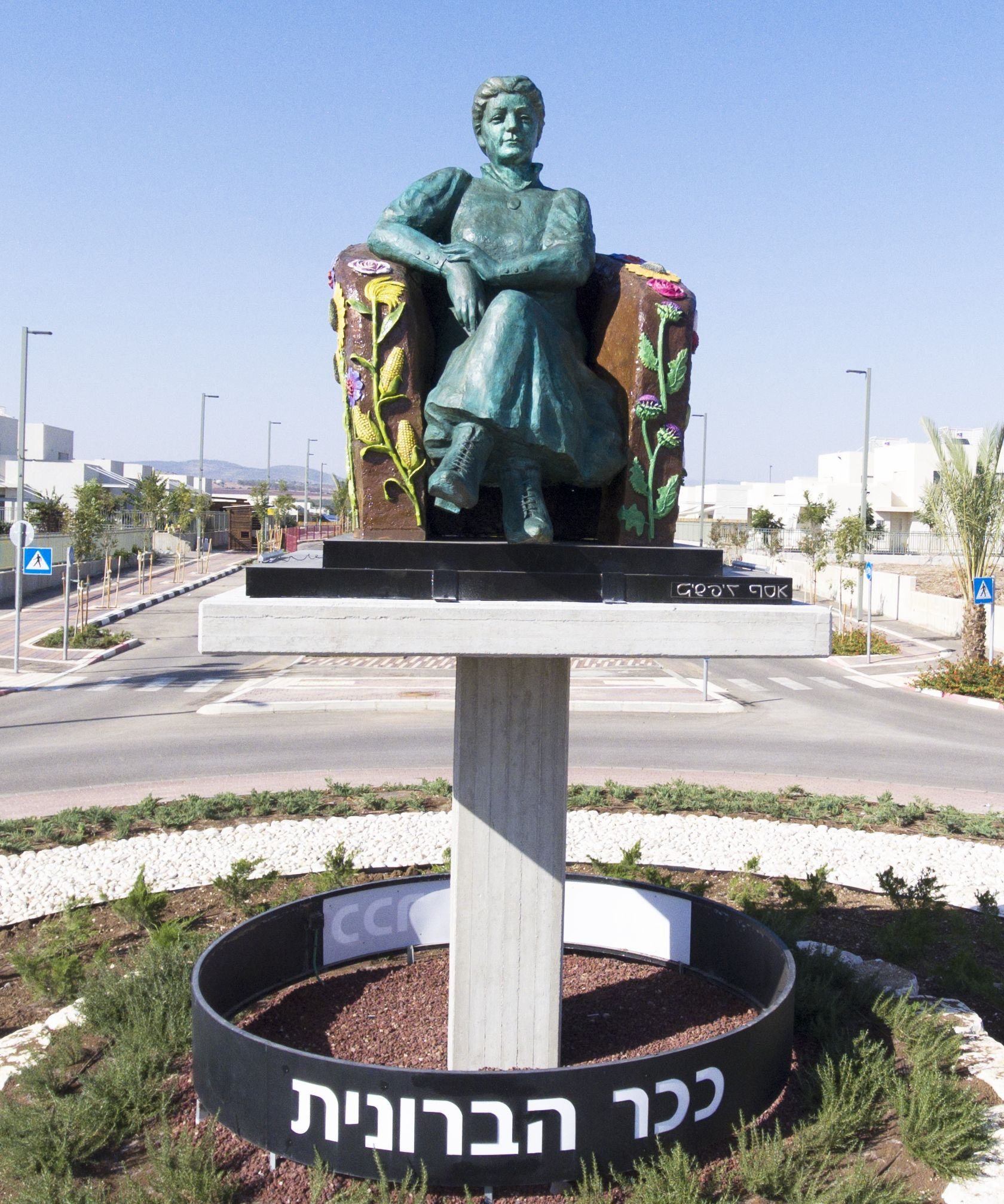
Statue of Adelheid von Rothschild, sculpted by Asaf Lifshitz, in the Baron Wife Square in Kfar Tavor
