= Alexandrine de Rothschild =

Art collector (1884–1965)

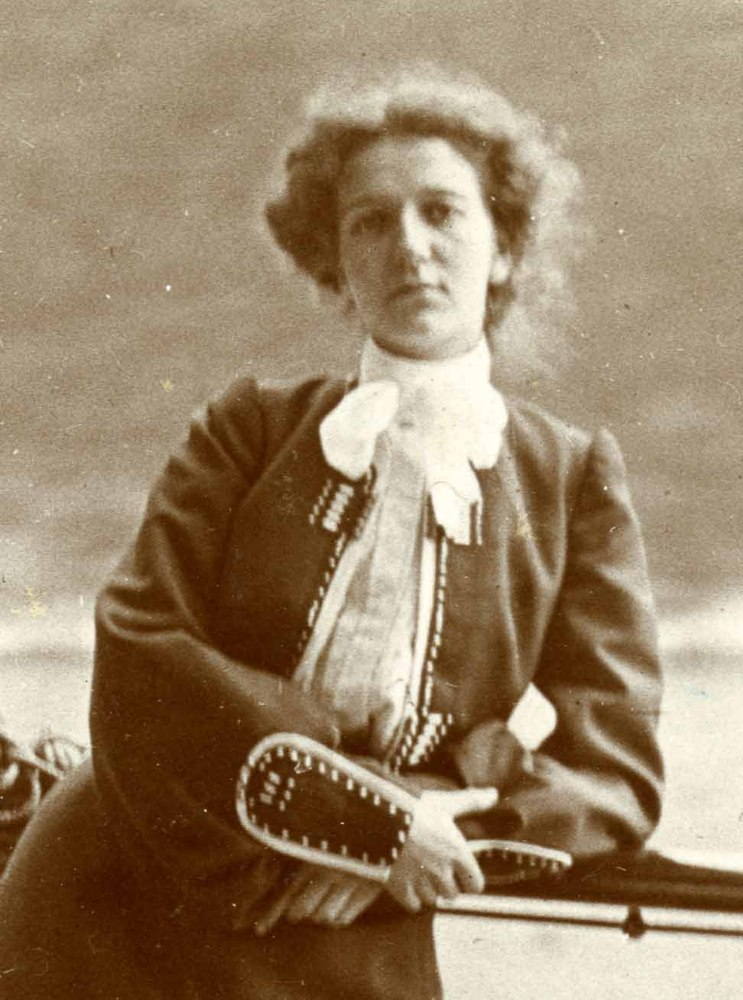
- Born: Baronne Miriam Caroline Alexandrine de Rothschild; 16 March 1884; Paris, France
- Died: 15 March 1965 (aged 80); Baden, Switzerland
- Spouse: Albert Max Goldschmidt (m. 1910)
- Parent(s): Edmond James de Rothschild; Adelheid von Rothschild
- Family: James Armand de Rothschild Maurice de Rothschild

Baronne Miriam Alexandrine de Rothschild (16 March 1884 – 15 March 1965) was an art collector and member of the Rothschild family.

== Early life ==
Born Alexandrine Miriam Caroline de Rothschild in Paris, on March 16, 1884, she was the youngest child and only daughter of Edmond James de Rothschild and Adelheid von Rothschild.

== Personal life ==
Relatives described Alexandrine as "similar to her cousin Alice: both were highly intelligent, authoritarian and inclined to appear plain.

Alexandrine "studied medicine, later specializing in dietetics" and had an avid love of gardening.

On December 15, 1910, Alexandrine married her cousin Albert Max Goldschmidt, the couple later divorced.

== Art patronage ==
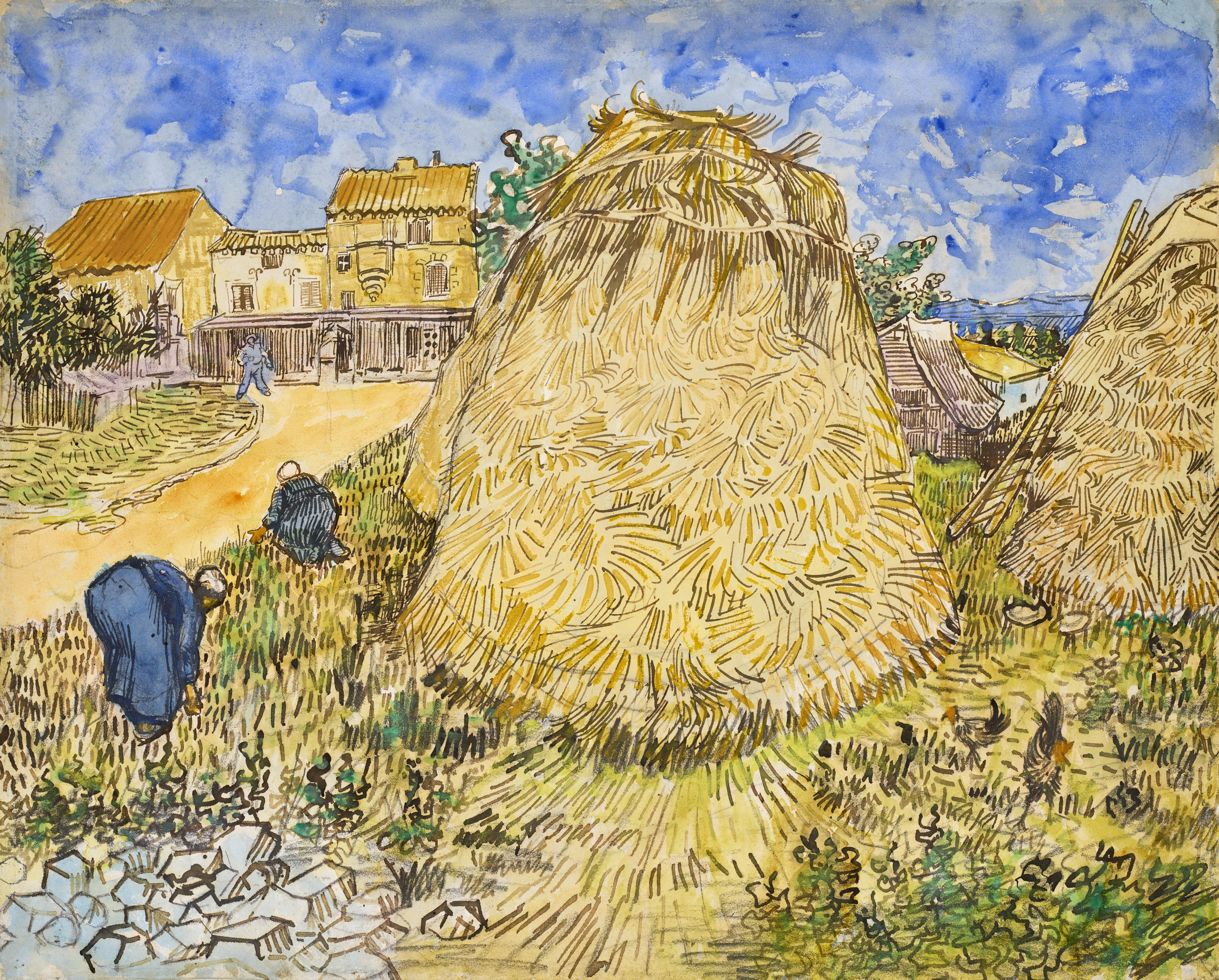
Haystacks near a Farm Vincent van Gogh

Alexandrine was a patron of they arts and collected work from various European artists. After her father's death in 1934 Alexandrine inherited the Château Boulogne-Billancourt and maintained the property grounds. A year after Paris fell to Nazi Germany in 1941 and the Château was seized by the Nazis and confiscated her private art collection. The West German government paid her $4,200,000 compensation for this in 1959 (equivalent to about $47 million in 2026).

In November 2021, Meules de blé (1888), was sold at Christie's for $35 million after a three party restitution agreement involving the heirs of Max Meirowsky, Alexandrine de Rothschild, and representatives for Cox's estate.

== Later life and death ==
In order to avoid further Nazi persecution Alexandrine fled to Switzerland. She resided at St. Moritz at the time of her death. Alexandrine was 80 when she died on March 15, 1965, in Baden, Switzerland. She posthumously funded the Beni Israel Trust to Israel.
