= Wilhelm Carl von Rothschild =

German banker (1828–1901)

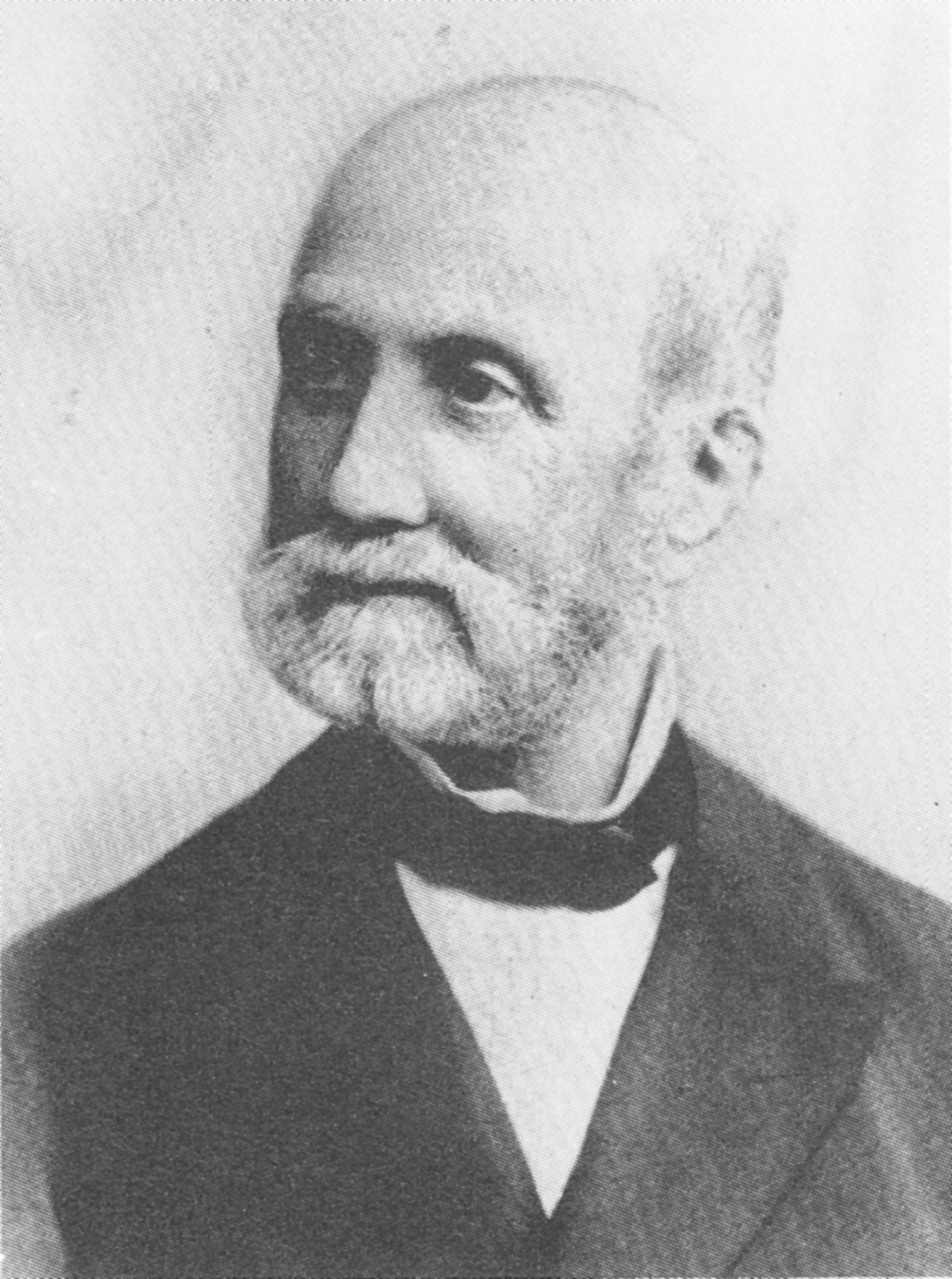
- Born: 16 May 1828; Naples, Kingdom of Two Sicilies
- Died: 25 January 1901 (aged 72); Frankfurt, German Empire
- Occupation: Banker
- Spouse: Mathilde Hannah von Rothschild (m. 1849)
- Children: 3, including Adelheid von Rothschild
- Parent(s): Carl Mayer von Rothschild; Adelheid Hertz

Baron Wilhelm Carl von Rothschild (Yiddish: שמעון וואלף רוטשילט; May 16, 1828 – 25 January 1901) was a banker and financier of the House of Rothschild.

== Life and career ==
Wilhelm Carl von Rothschild was the son of Baron Carl Mayer von Rothschild of Naples and Adelheid Hertz. He was known by some as "The Tzadik of the Rothschild House." He strongly supported many Orthodox Jewish institutions and studied in Yeshivas. He married his cousin Mathilde Hannah von Rothschild, the second oldest daughter of Anselm von Rothschild, a chief of the Vienna House of Rothschilds in 1849. The couple first resided in the Rothschild house on the Zeil (Zeilpalast), but later moved to a palace in Grüneburg, and also lived in a villa in Königstein im Taunus. They had three daughters, two of which survived to adulthood. Adelheid von Rothschild married her cousin Edmond James de Rothschild, while her younger sister Minna Caroline Rothschild married Maximilian Goldschmidt, who adopted the name "Goldschmidt-Rothschild" after Wilhelm Carl's death in 1901.

In 1855 von Rothschild became joint head with his brother Mayer Karl of M. A. Rothschild & Söhne in Frankfurt. When his brother died in 1886, he became sole head. As he and his brother left no male heirs, the Frankfurt house was discontinued at his death.

Von Rothschild, who was religious his entire life, was eulogized by Eliyahu David Rabinowitz-Teomim at the Yeshivas Knesses Beis Yitzchak-Kaminetz in Kaunas as הצדיק השר הטפסר (the righteous, the nobleman, the aristocracy).

== See also ==
- Rothschild banking family of Austria
- Rothschild banking family of England
- Rothschild banking family of France
- Rothschild banking family of Naples
