= Edmond James de Rothschild =

French member of the Rothschild banking family

Baron Edmond James de Rothschild
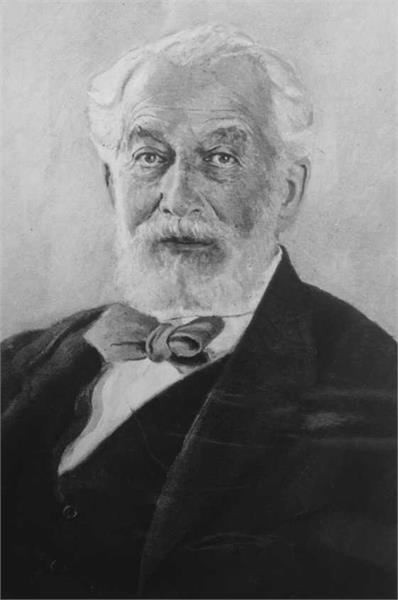
- Rothschild in 1928
- Born: Abraham Edmond Benjamin James de Rothschild; 19 August 1845; Boulogne-Billancourt, France
- Died: 2 November 1934 (aged 89); Boulogne-Billancourt, France
- Resting place: Ramat HaNadiv (Israel); Père Lachaise (France) (1935–1954)
- Spouse: Adelheid von Rothschild (m. 1877)
- Children: James Armand de Rothschild; Maurice de Rothschild; Alexandrine de Rothschild
- Parent(s): James Mayer Rothschild; Betty von Rothschild

Baron Abraham Edmond Benjamin James de Rothschild (Note: Hebrew: הברון אברהם אדמונד בנימין ג'יימס רוטשילד, romanized: HaBaron Avraham Edmond Binyamin Ya'akov Rotshield) (19 August 1845 – 2 November 1934) was a French member of the Rothschild banking family. A strong supporter of Zionism, his large donations lent significant support to the first Jewish settlements in Palestine (the First Aliyah), which eventually led to the establishment of the State of Israel—where he is simply known as "Baron Rothschild", "HaBaron" (lit. 'The Baron'), or "Hanadiv Hayeduah" (lit. 'The noble philanthropist').

== Early years ==
Rothschild was born in the Paris suburb of Boulogne-Billancourt, Hauts-de-Seine, the youngest child of James Mayer Rothschild and Betty von Rothschild. He grew up as the son of the patriarch of the French branch of the Rothschild banking dynasty in the world of the Second Republic and the Second Empire, and served in the “Garde Mobile" in the Franco-Prussian War.

== Artistic and philanthropic interests ==
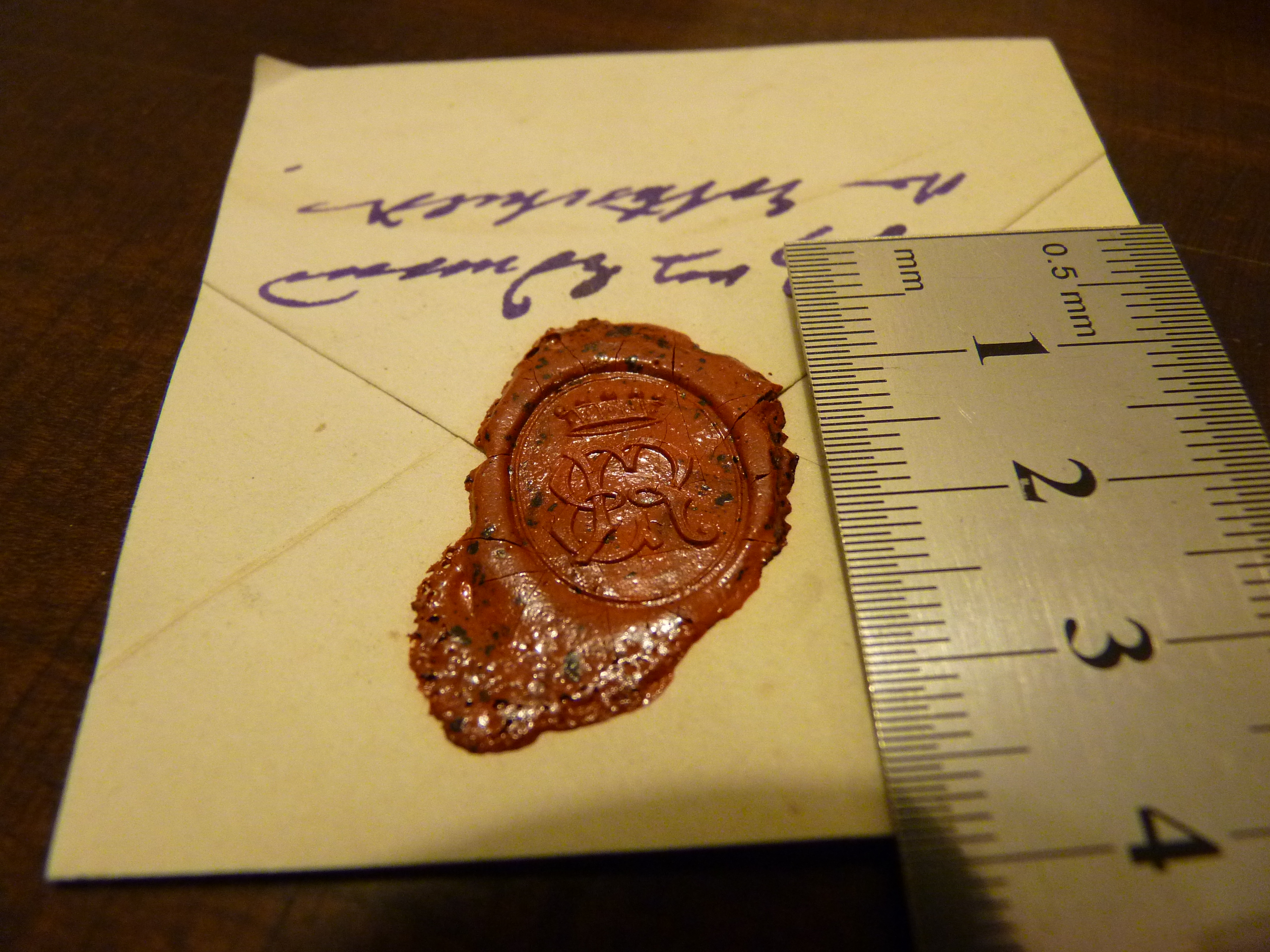
Edmond de Rothschild's wax seal with his monogram and a heraldic coronet symbolising his rank as a baron

=== Art, science and academy ===
Edmond de Rothschild inherited Château Rothschild in Boulogne-Billancourt and, in 1877, acquired the Château d'Armainvilliers in Gretz-Armainvilliers in the Seine-et-Marne département.

Edmond took little active part in banking but pursued artistic and philanthropic interests, helping to found scientific research institutions such as the Institut Henri Poincaré, the Institut de Biologie physico-chimique, the pre-Centre National de la Recherche Scientifique, the Casa Velázquez in Madrid, and the French Institute in London. In 1907, as a cofounder member, he also provided funds and support for the foundation of the Friends of the French National Museum of Natural History Society. He served as a member of the French Académie des Beaux-Arts and through it sponsored the archaeological digs of Charles Simon Clermont-Ganneau in Egypt, Eustache de Lorey in Ottoman Syria, and Raymond Weill in Palestine.

Edmond de Rothschild acquired an important collection of drawings and engravings that he bequeathed to the Louvre consisting of more than 40,000 engravings, nearly 3,000 drawings, and 500 illustrated books. Included in this gift were more than one hundred engravings and drawings by Rembrandt. A portion of his art collection was bequeathed to his son James A. de Rothschild and is now part of the National Trust collection at Waddesdon Manor. However, in 1882 Edmond cut back on his purchases of art and began to buy land in Ottoman Palestine.

Rothschild also sponsored archaeological excavations, including those undertaken by Judith Marquet-Krause at Et-Tell.

=== World Travel ===
In 1898 he commissioned naval architect George Lennox Watson of Fairfield Shipbuilding and Engineering Company to build the huge luxury steam yacht SY 'Atmah' (1665 tons) in which he and his sons used to tour the world until 1939.

=== Zionism ===
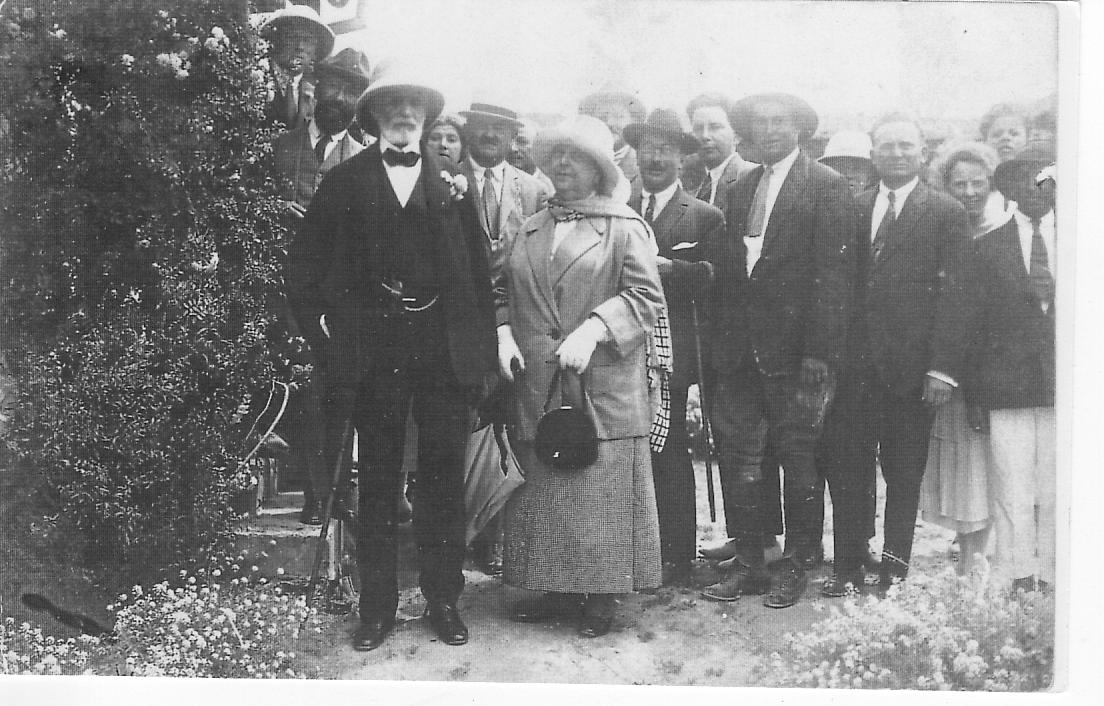
Visit of Adelheid and Edmond James de Rothschild to Palestine in 1914

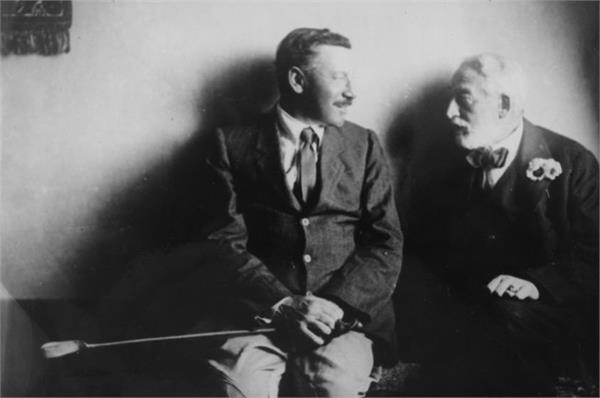
Edmond de Rothschild with High Commissioner Herbert Samuel, Palestine, 1920

Although he remained separate from the Zionist movement, and "rejected institutional and ideological Zionism," The Baron Rothschild became an avid supporter of Jewish settlement in Palestine financing the site at Rishon LeZion. In his goal for the establishment of Palestine as a home for Jewish settlement, he promoted industrialization and economic development. In 1924, he established the Palestine Jewish Colonization Association (PICA), which acquired more than 125,000 acres (50,586 ha) of land and set up business ventures.

Edmond de Rothschild also played a pivotal role in establishing the Yishuv's wine industry. Under the supervision of his administrators in Ottoman Palestine, farm colonies and vineyards were established, and two major wineries were opened in Rishon LeZion and Zikhron Ya'akov. Rothschild funded a glass factory that would supply bottles for his wineries. Rothschild met Meir Dizengoff in Paris and chose Dizengoff to launch and manage the new factory, called Mizaga. Dizengoff opened the factory in Tantura in 1892 and managed the factory for approximately two years. Mizaga was the first Jewish-owned factory in Ottoman Palestine.

Rothschild also backed research in electricity by engineers and financed the development of an electric generating station.

According to historian Albert M. Hyamson, "Rothschild recognised that the overriding interest of Palestinian Jews was the confidence and the friendship of their Arab neighbours. The interests of the Arab cultivators of the land he bought were never overlooked, but by development he made this land capable of maintaining a population ten times its former size." While Edmond de Rothschild was not always supportive of an inclusive government—he suggested in 1931 to Judah Magnes that "We must hold them (the Arabs) down with a strong hand"—he acknowledged the importance of co-governance and peaceful coexistence in a 1934 letter to the League of Nations, stating that "the struggle to put an end to the Wandering Jew, could not have as its result, the creation of the Wandering Arab."

== Personal life ==
In 1877, he married Adelheid von Rothschild of Naples, the daughter of Wilhelm Carl von Rothschild, one of the Rothschild banking family of Naples, with whom he had three children: James Armand Edmond, Maurice Edmond Karl and Miriam Caroline Alexandrine.

== Death ==
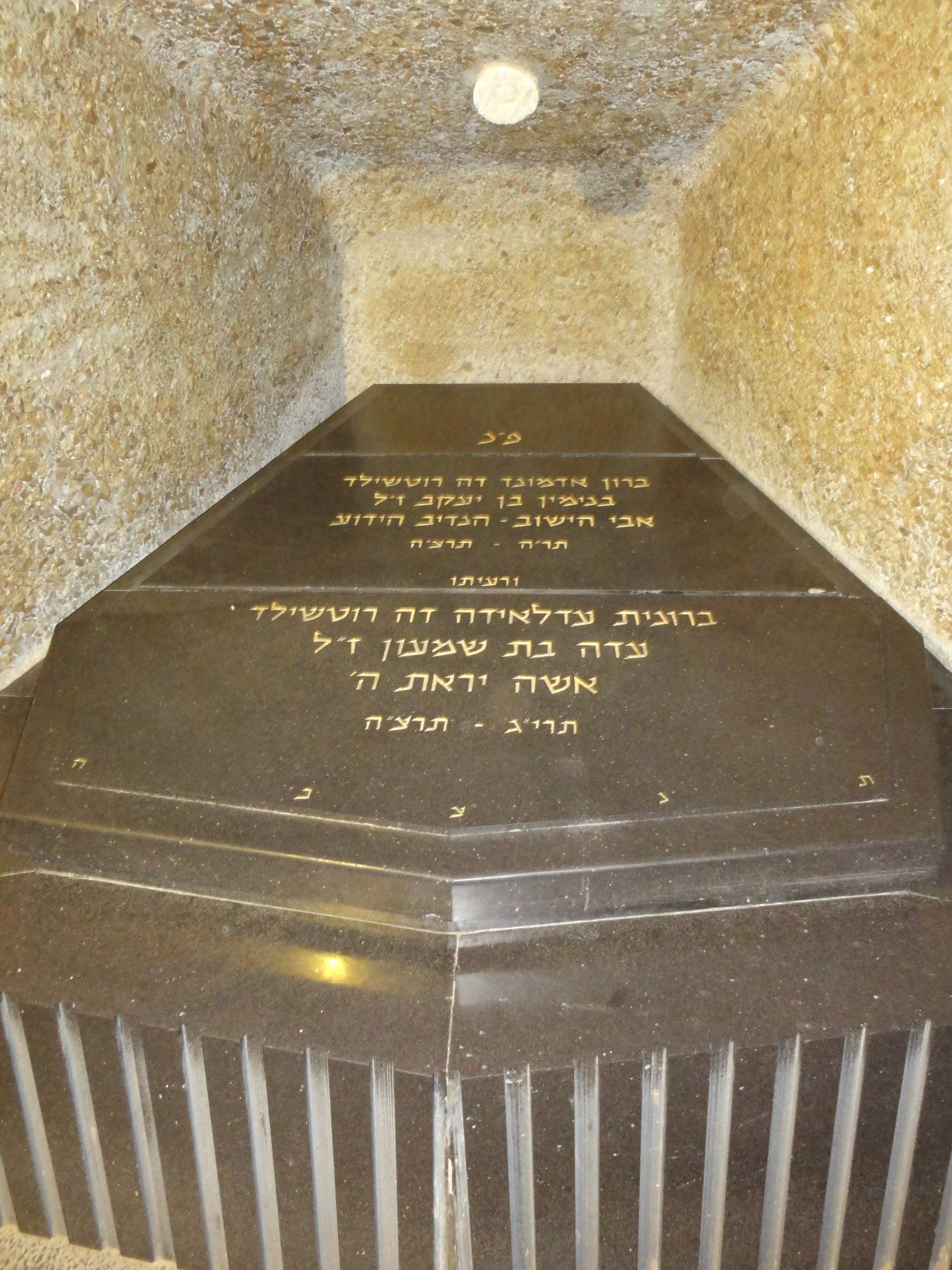
Baron Edmond de Rothschild's grave at Ramat HaNadiv

In 1934, Rothschild died at Château Rothschild, Boulogne-Billancourt. His wife died a year later on 29 December 1935. They were interred in Père Lachaise Cemetery in Paris until April 1954, when their remains were transported to Israel aboard a naval frigate.

At the port of Haifa, the ship was met with sirens and a 19-gun salute. A state funeral was held, with former Prime Minister David Ben-Gurion giving the eulogy, following which Rothschild and his wife were re-interred atop a hill near Haifa in what today is called Ramat HaNadiv (The Generous one's Heights) Memorial Gardens, near the towns of Zichron Ya'akov ("in Memoriam of Jacob") and Binyamina ("of Benjamin"), both of which he helped fund, and are named in his father's and his honor, respectively. The open space at Ramat HaNadiv and the Rothschild family charity Yad HaNadiv ("The generous one's hand" and also "The generous one's memory"), are also named in his honor. The charity was started in 1954, the year the Rothschilds were buried in Israel, to carry on the legacy of the Baron’s earlier philanthropy in Palestine, and his colony association, the PICA.

== Legacy ==
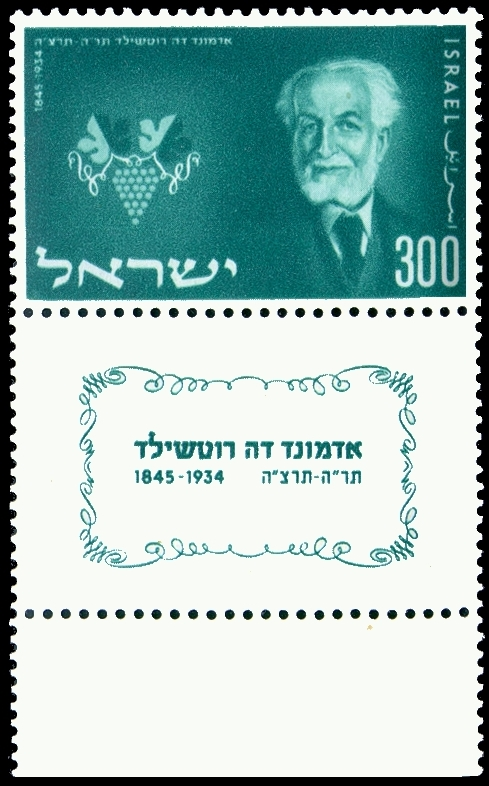
Israeli postal stamp, 1954

For his Jewish philanthropy Baron Edmond became known as "HaNadiv HaYadu'a", (Hebrew for "The Known Benefactor" or "The Famous Benefactor") and in his memory his son bequeathed the funds to construct the building for the Knesset. He is also sometimes called "The Father of the Yishuv" for his early support of Zionism.

Israel's 1982/5742 Independence Day coin is dedicated to the memory of Edmond de Rothschild and marks the centenary of his first projects in Israel. From 1982 until 1986, the Bank of Israel used his portrait on the 500 Israeli sheqel note.

Rothschild Boulevard in Tel Aviv is named after him, as well as various localities throughout Israel which he assisted in founding. Rishon LeZion, the city which he helped to found, named one of the central streets Rothschild Street, and in 1996 Rothschild Mall was built. Also named after him is the Parc Edmond de Rothschild (Edmond de Rothschild Park) in Boulogne-Billancourt.

== See also ==
- Isaac Leib Goldberg (1860–1935), Zionist leader and philanthropist from Russia
- Maurice de Hirsch (1831–1896), German Jewish financier and philanthropist, founder of the Jewish Colonization Association
