= Maximilian von Goldschmidt-Rothschild =

German banker and art collector

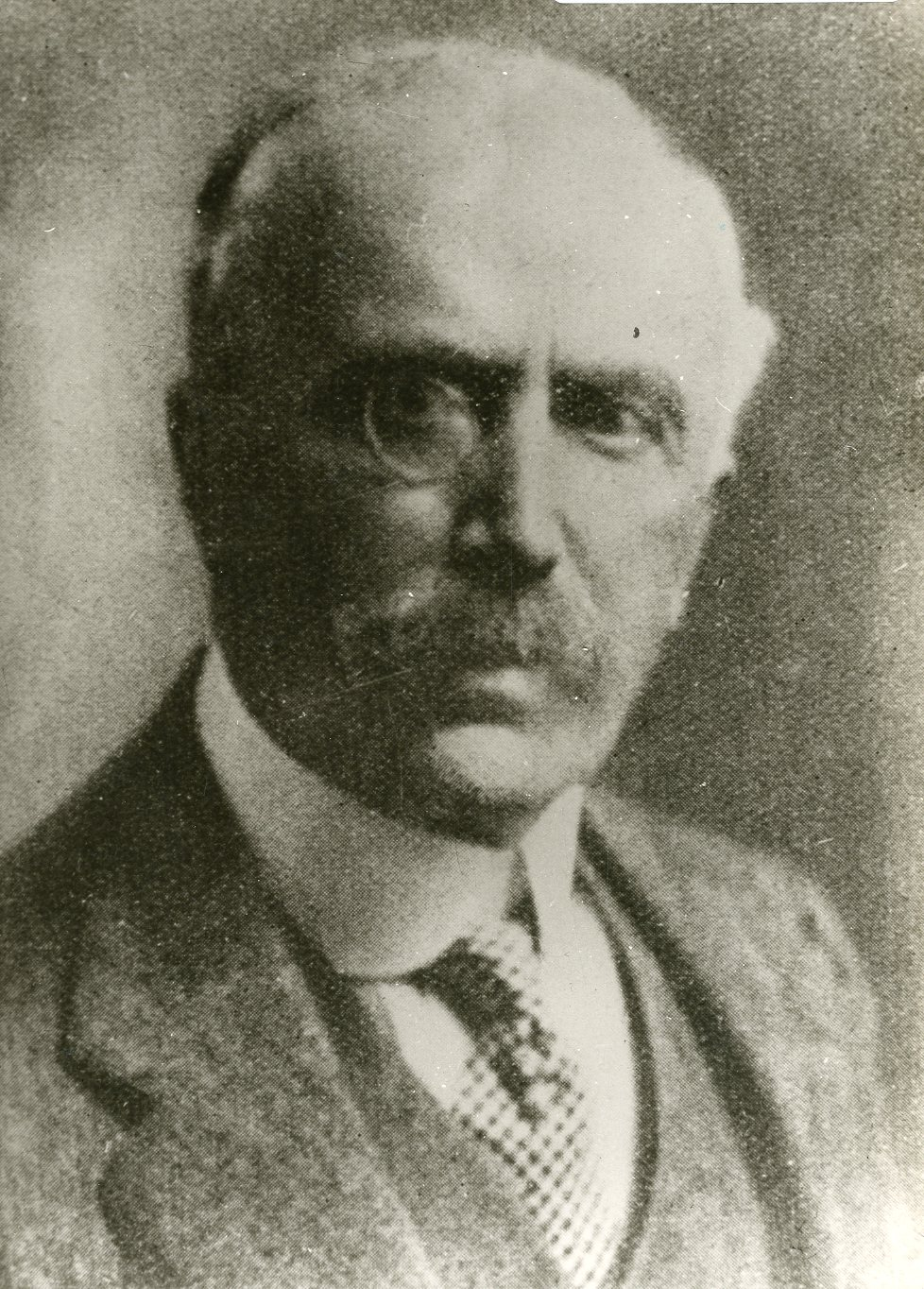
- Born: Maximilian Benedikt Hayum Goldschmidt; 20 June 1843; Frankfurt, Germany
- Died: 18 February 1940 (aged 96); Frankfurt, Germany
- Spouse: Minna Karoline Freiin von Rothschild
- Relatives: Bina Rothschild (daughter-in-law)

Maximilian von Goldschmidt-Rothschild (20 June 1843 – 18 February 1940) was a German banker and art collector. The son of Benedict Hayum Salomon Goldschmidt, he was the co-inheritor of the Goldschmidt family's bank, along with his brother Adolphe Goldschmidt.

He married Minna Karoline Freiin von Rothschild, the daughter of Wilhelm Carl von Rothschild. At one point, he was considered the richest person in the German Empire. After the death of his father-in-law, the last male of the Frankfurt Rothschilds, Maximilian Goldschmidt and his wife adopted Rothschild's surname. Emperor William I gave him the title of Baron de Goldschmidt-Rothschild.

During the Nazi regime, he had to sell his art collection of almost 1400 items (pictures, furniture, sculptures, carpets, porcelain, faience, silver, glasses) to the city of Frankfurt for 2,551,730 Reichsmarks in November 1938.
