= Uri Lifschitz =

Israeli painter (1936–2011)

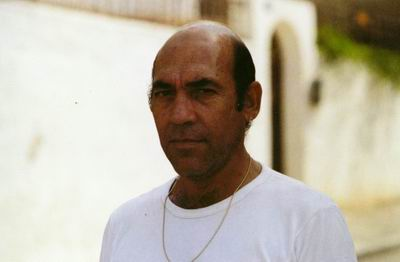
Uri Lifschitz

Uri Lifschitz (Hebrew: אורי ליפשיץ; 1936 – 28 May 2011) was an Israeli painter.

== Biography ==
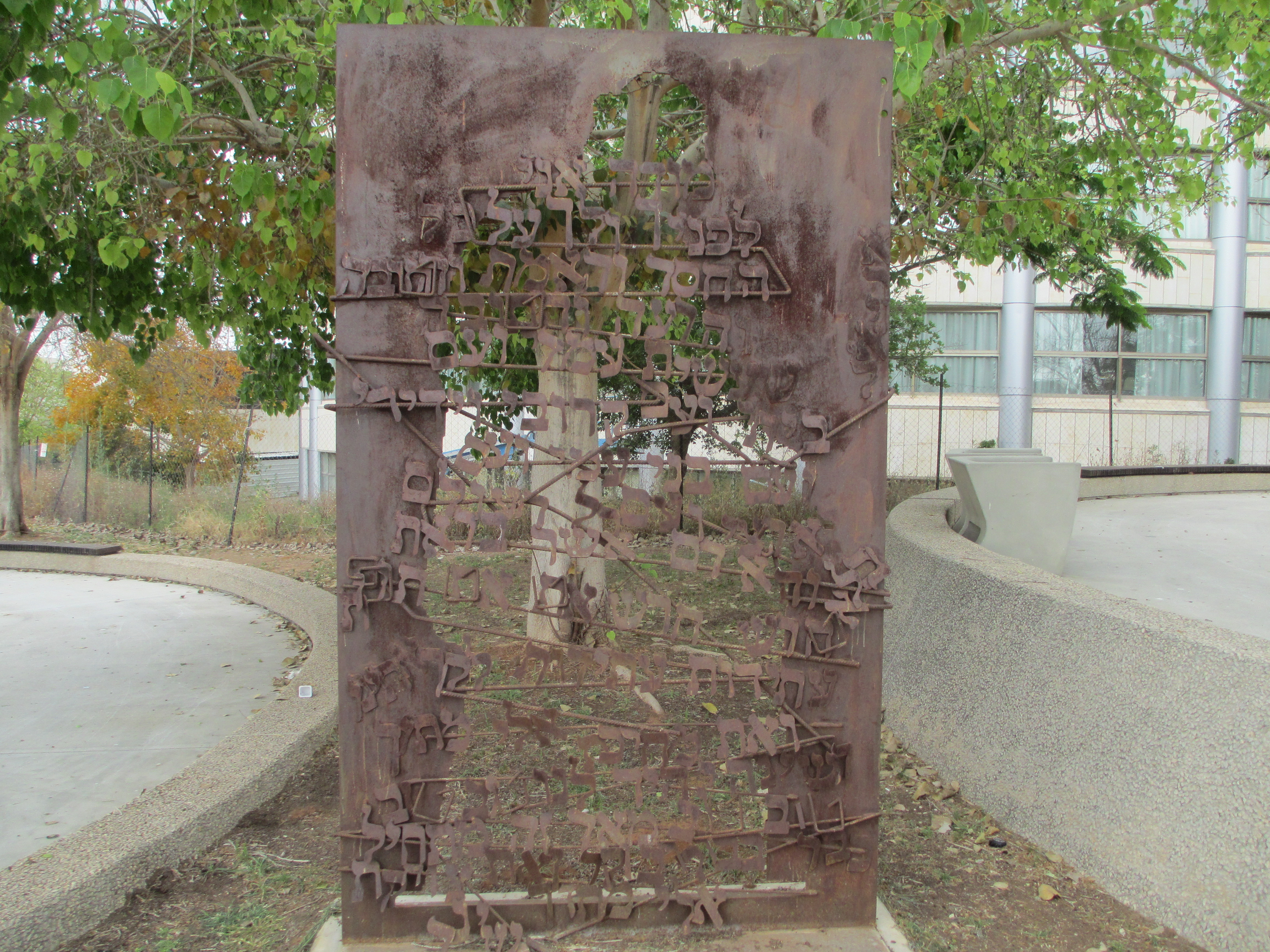

Uri Lifschitz was born on Kibbutz Givat HaShlosha in Mandatory Palestine. He served in the Israel Defense Forces paratrooper Unit 101 under Ariel Sharon. He began painting in the 1950s. In the 1960s and 1970s, he was one of the founders of the 10 Plus group, which posed an alternative to the lyrical abstract style of the New Horizons movement.

== Awards and recognition ==
Lifschitz won the Eugen Kolb Prize from the Tel Aviv Museum of Art in 1965, the Erasmus Prize in 1966, and the Dizengoff Prize in 1985.
