= Caesarea–Pardes Hanna railway station =

Railway station in Israel

Coordinates: 32°29′7.58″N 34°57′14.75″E

Caesarea–Pardes Hanna קיסריה – פרדס חנה
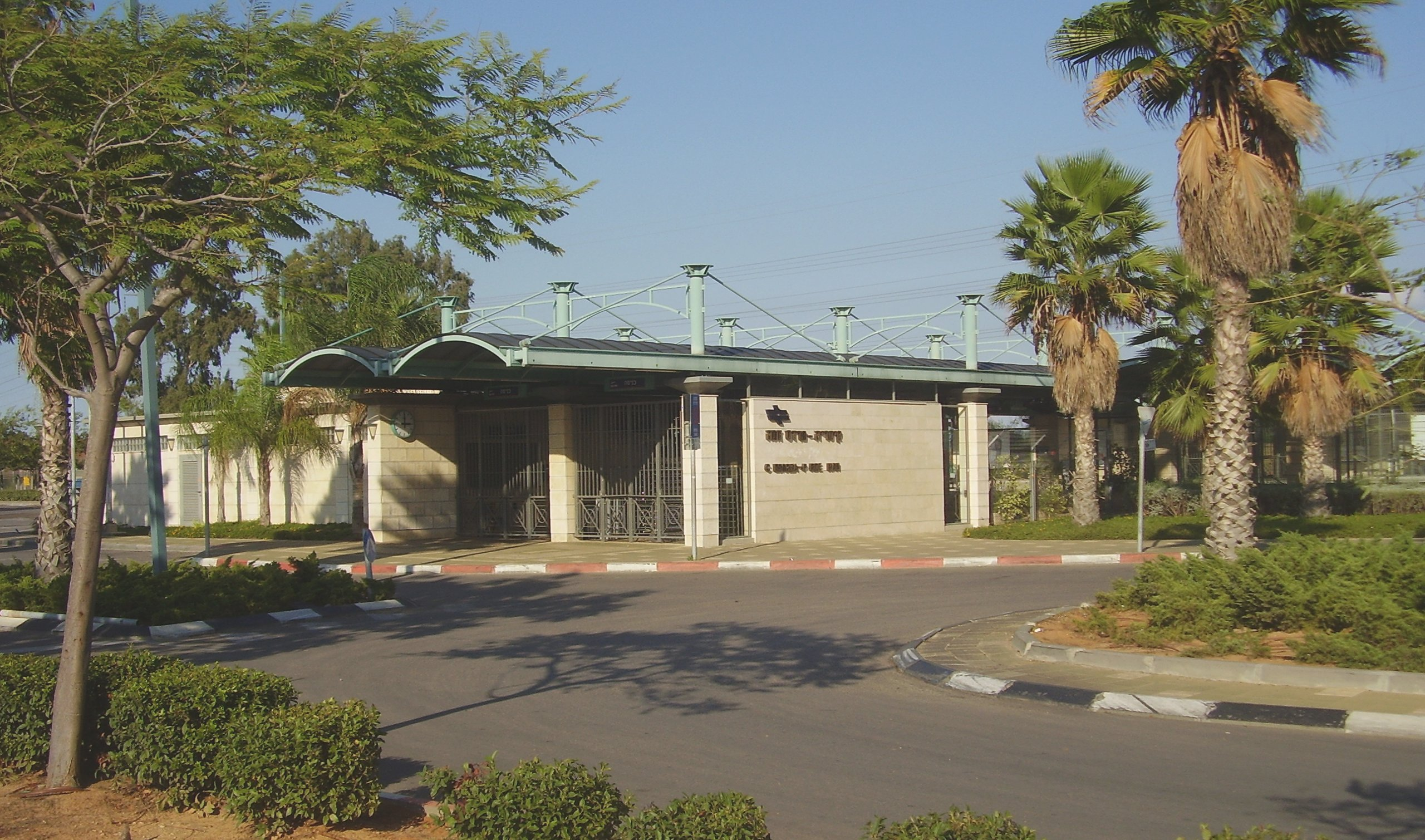
- Western side of the station

General information
- Platforms: 2
- Tracks: 2

History
- Opened: 1 July 2001; 25 years ago
- Electrified: 11 February 2023; 3 years ago

Passengers
- 2019: 1,339,506
- Rank: 33 out of 68
Location

Caesarea–Pardes Hanna railway station (Hebrew: תחנת הרכבת קיסריה – פרדס חנה, Taḥanat HaRakevet Keisariya-Pardes Ḥana) is an Israel Railways passenger station between the local council Pardes Hanna-Karkur and Caesarea's industrial zone, and serves these towns, their large industrial zones, as well as Or Akiva and other small communities in the area.

== Location ==
The station is situated on the north–south coastal line and is located to the northwest of Pardes Hanna-Karkur, at the eastern edge of The Northern Caesarea Industries Park (Hebrew: פארק תעשיות קיסריה הצפוני).

== History ==
Caesarea-Pardes Hanna station was opened on 1 July 2001 as a suburban station on the newly inaugurated Tel Aviv – Binyamina Suburban Service. The station was constructed to provide a railway link for the area's growing population as well as encourage rail commuting to the industrial zone in the vicinity.

The cost of constructing the station was 7 million NIS (about 1.7 million USD), and was partially funded by the Caesarea Development Corporation.

== Design ==
The station consists of two side platforms with two parallel rail tracks running between them. The station hall is located on the west platform on the grounds of the industrial park. A pedestrian tunnel connects the two platforms beneath the tracks as well as providing access to the station from the eastern (Pardes Hanna) side of the rail tracks.

The station is unique with its teal coloring, and the designs of the shelters on the platforms.

== Train service ==
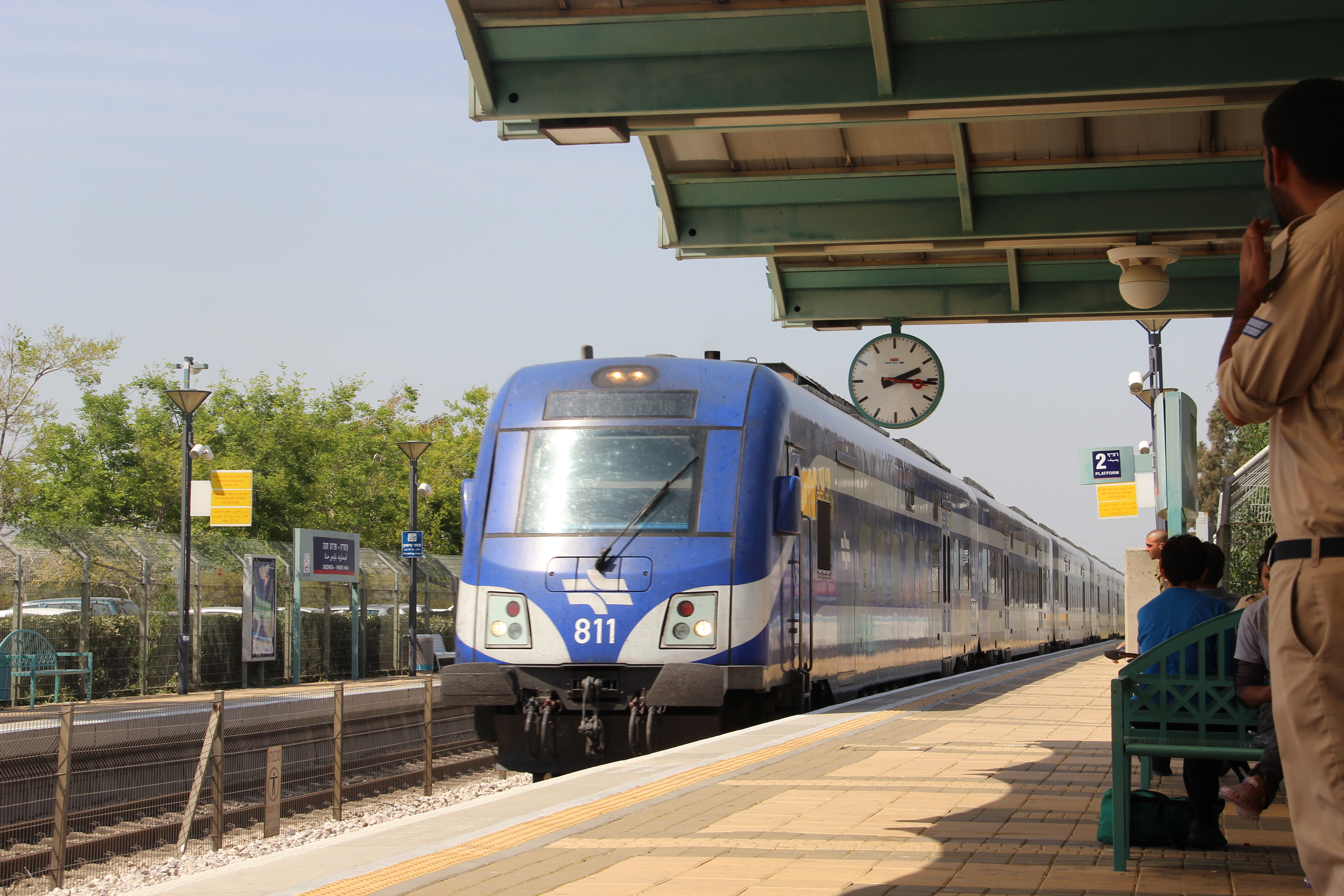
Train at the station.

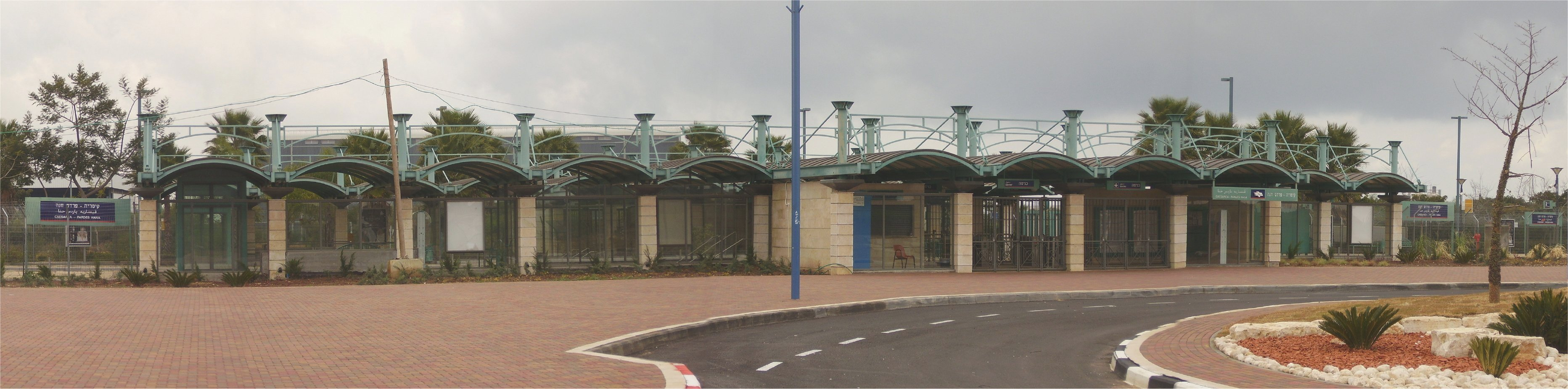
Wide view of the station's eastern entrance

Caesarea-Pardes Hanna station is a station on the Tel Aviv suburban line (Binyamina/Netanya–Tel Aviv–Rehovot–Ashkelon–Netivot–Beersheba Suburban Service). Almost all Inter-City trains pass through this station without stopping, except on the weekends. The station is situated between Binyamina Railway Station to the north and Hadera Ma'arav (West) Railway Station to the south.

Timetable highlights:

- Suburban service:
  - On weekdays the station is served by 21 southbound and 23 northbound suburban trains. First train departs at 06:20 and last train arrives at 21:45.
  - On Fridays and holiday eves the station is served by 5 southbound and 6 northbound suburban trains. First train departs at 10:52 and last train arrives at 14:55.
- Inter-City service:
  - On weekdays the station is served only by 5 northbound trains – an early morning train at 06:19 and 4 late night trains from 21:29 until 00:23
  - On Fridays and holiday eves the station is served by 13 southbound and 9 northbound trains. First train departs at 06:16 and last train arrives at 14:39.
  - On Motzei Shabbat and holiday the station is served by 6 southbound and 5 northbound trains. First train departs at 19:20 and last train arrives at 21:46.

Preceding station	Israel Railways	Following station
Binyamina Terminus	Binyamina–Beersheba	Hadera–West towards Be'er Sheva–Center

== Station layout ==
Platform numbers increase in an East-to-West direction

Side platform
Platform 1	Nahariya–Modi'in trains toward Modi'in–Center do not stop here → Nahariya–Beersheba and Karmiel–Beersheba trains toward Be'er Sheva–Center do not stop here → Binyamina–Beersheba trains toward Be'er Sheva–Center (Hadera–West) → Night Train toward Ben Gurion Airport does not stop here →
Platform 2	← Nahariya–Modi'in and Nahariya–Beersheba trains toward Nahariya do not stop here ← Karmiel–Beersheba trains toward Karmiel do not stop here ← Binyamina–Beersheba trains toward Binyamina (terminus) ← Night Train toward Nahariya does not stop here
Side platform

== Ridership ==
Passengers boarding and disembarking by year
Year	Passengers	Rank	Source
2021	749,923 (▲272,659)	27 of 66 (▲5)	2021 Freedom of Information Law Annual Report
2020	477,264 (▼862,242)	32 of 68 (▲1)	2020 Freedom of Information Law Annual Report
2019	1,339,506	33 of 68	2019 Freedom of Information Law Annual Report

== Public transport connections ==
Caesarea-Pardes Hanna station is located inside an industrial area but several bus lines pass outside the station. The bus lines are:

- 4: Pardes Hanna-Karkur–Caesarea-Pardes Hanna, operated by Egged.
- 10: Or Aqiva–Orot, operated by Kavim.
- 11: Or Aqiva–Orot, operated by Kavim.
- 28: Pardes Hanna-Karkur–Caesarea-Pardes Hanna, operated by Egged.
- 67: Hadera–Caesarea-Pardes Hanna, operated by Kavim.
- 80: Caesarea–Caesarea-Pardes Hanna, operated by Kavim.

== Facilities ==
- Payphone
- Ticket cashier
- Parking lot
- Toilet
