= Netanya railway station =

Railway station in Israel

Netanya נתניה
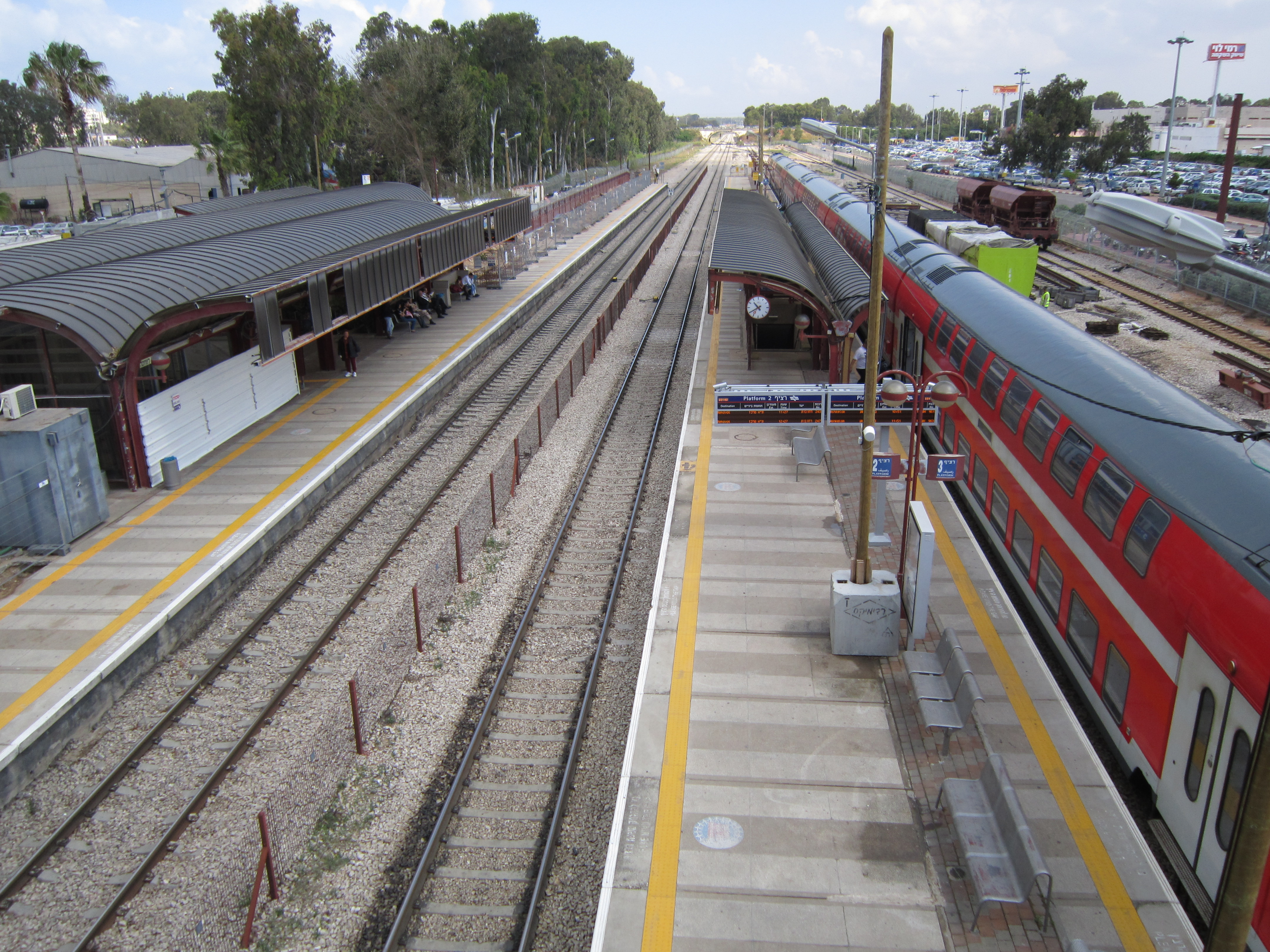

General information
- Location: 5 HaRakevet Way, Netanya
- Coordinates: 32°19′11″N 34°52′09″E
- Platforms: 3
- Tracks: 5

Construction
- Parking: 270 spaces
- Cycle facilities: 15 spaces

History
- Opened: May 1953; 73 years ago
- Electrified: 17 September 2022; 4 years ago

Passengers
- 2019: 3,563,026
- Rank: 9 out of 68
Location

Netanya railway station (Hebrew: תחנת הרכבת נתניה, Taḥanat HaRakevet Netanya) is an Israel Railways passenger station located in the city of Netanya and serves the city, with its large North industrial zone, as well as other small communities in the area.

== Location ==
The station is situated on the North-South coastal line and is located in the western part of Netanya, 500 meters southeast of the Netanya Interchange where the Coastal Highway (Highway 2) meets Route 57. Its address is 5 HaRakevet Street (Hebrew: רחוב הרכבת, The Railway Street). The station is one of three railway stations serving the central portion of the Sharon plain, the others being Netanya Sapir railway station in the South industrial zone, and Beit Yehoshua railway station further south.

== History ==
In 1993 Israel Railways introduced the concept of regional rail by inaugurating the Netanya – Tel Aviv Suburban Service. Netanya was the northern terminus of the suburban trains as well as continuing to be a stop on the Haifa – Tel Aviv Inter-City Service.

When Israel Railways reorganized the suburban service in the late 1990s the line was extended to Binyamina and Netanya railway station lost its terminus status (except for rush hours, when an additional train leaves the station for Tel Aviv and the southern suburbs). As part of the same reorganization it was decided that Inter-City trains would, in most cases, skip the station in order to reduce travel time between the two large metropolises of Haifa and Tel Aviv. The same rule was applied on all intermediate stations between Tel Aviv University railway station and Binyamina railway station, except for some late-night and early morning trains.

== Design ==
The station consists of a side platform and an island platform, numbered 1 to 3 from west to east. Between the side platform and the island platform there are two parallel rail tracks, and an additional track to the east of platform 3, there are several additional free tacks to the east of the station in use by freight trains.

The station hall is located to the west of the rail tracks. The two platforms are interconnected by a pedestrian tunnel. Parking lots are located on both sides of the station.

Platform 1 is used for northbound suburban trains, platform 2 for southbound suburban trains. Platform 3 is used during the rush hour by the suburban trains that use the stations as a terminus.

== Train service ==
Netanya railway station is a station on the Tel Aviv suburban line (Binyamina/Netanya–Tel Aviv–Rehovot/Ashkelon Suburban Service). Almost all Inter-City trains pass through this station without stopping, except on the weekends. The station is situated between Hadera Ma'arav (West) railway station to the north and Netanya Sapir to the south.

- Suburban Service:
  - On weekdays the station is served by 38 southbound and 35 northbound suburban trains. First train departs at 06:36 and last train arrives at 21:31.
  - On Fridays and holiday eves the station is served by 5 southbound and 6 northbound suburban trains. First train departs at 10:52 and last train arrives at 14:55.
- Inter-City Service:
  - On weekdays the station is served by 6 early morning southbound trains (02:11–06:22), 3 early morning northbound trains (04:24–06:03) and 5 late night northbound trains (20:12–00:07).
  - On Fridays and holiday eves the station is served by 18 southbound and 11 northbound trains. First train departs at 02:11 and last train arrives at 14:23.
  - On Saturdays and holiday the station is served by 6 southbound and 5 northbound trains. First train departs at 19:38 and last train arrives at 21:27.
  - Since November 14th 2026, there are direct train services every 30 minutes to Jerusalem–Yitzhak Navon via Beit Yehoshua, Herzliya, all Tel Aviv stations and Ben Gurion Airport.

Preceding station	Israel Railways	Following station
Hadera–West towards Binyamina	Binyamina–Beersheba	Netanya–Sapir towards Be'er Sheva–Center
Terminus	Netanya–Rehovot	Beit Yehoshua towards Rehovot
Terminus	Netanya–Beit Shemesh	Beit Yehoshua towards Beit Shemesh
Hadera–West towards Nahariya	Night Train Nahariya–Ben Gurion Airport	Herzliya towards Ben Gurion Airport

== Station layout ==
Platform numbers increase in a West-to-East direction

Side platform
Platform 1
Nahariya–Modi'in and Nahariya–Beersheba trains toward Nahariya do not stop here →
Karmiel–Beersheba trains toward Karmiel do not stop here →
Binyamina–Beersheba trains toward Binyamina (Hadera–West) →

Hadera-Jerusalem trains toward Hadera–West (Hadera–West) →
Night Train toward Nahariya (Hadera–West) →

Platform 2
← Nahariya–Modi'in trains toward Modi'in–Center do not stop here
← Nahariya–Beersheba and Karmiel–Beersheba trains toward Be'er Sheva–Center do not stop here
← Binyamina–Beersheba trains toward Be'er Sheva–Center (Netanya–Sapir)

← Hadera-Jerusalem trains toward Jerusalem–Yitzhak Navon (Beit Yehoshua)
← Night Train toward Ben Gurion Airport (Herzliya)

Island platform
Platform 3
← Netanya–Rehovot trains toward Rehovot (Beit Yehoshua) (peak hours only)
← Netanya–Jerusalem trains toward Jerusalem-Yitzhak Navon (Beit Yehoshua)

== Ridership ==
Passengers boarding and disembarking by year
Year	Passengers	Rank	Source
2021	1,596,659 (▲383,930)	13 of 66 (▼2)	2021 Freedom of Information Law Annual Report
2020	1,212,729 (▼2,350,297)	11 of 68 (▼2)	2020 Freedom of Information Law Annual Report
2019	3,563,026	9 of 68	2019 Freedom of Information Law Annual Report

== Public transport connections ==
Netanya railway station is located in a fairly remote location, accessible mainly by private cars, buses, taxis or Sherut Taxis (share taxis).

=== Bus lines ===
==== Local lines ====
These lines are operated by Egged Ta'avura.

- 5: Netanya Central bus station–Netanya railway station. An express service to the Central bus station. Operated also on non peak hours.
- 14: Netanya railway station–Pituah via Center neighborhoods. Peak hours only.
- 16: Netanya railway station–Center neighborhoods via Kiryat Sanz. Peak hours only.
- 20: Netanya railway station–Kiryat HaSharon. Peak hours only. Departs from the east entrance.
- 25: Netanya railway station–Ein HaTekhelet. Peak hours only.

==== Regional lines ====
There are some bus lines to nearby towns. These lines are operated by Kavim.

=== Sherut Taxi ===
There is one Sherut Taxi line.

- 79: Rassco neighborhood–Netanya railway station, operated by Shay-Li Taxis.

== Facilities ==
- Payphone
- Ticket cashier
- Ticket machine
- Buffet
- Parking lot
- Toilet
- Taxi station
