= Edmond de Rothschild Foundation (Israel) =

Non-profit organization based in Israel

- הקרן על שם אדמונד דה רוטשילד
- The Edmond de Rothschild Foundation Logo
- Formation: 1990; 36 years ago
- Founder: Baron Edmond de Rothschild
- Type: Nonprofit organization
- Purpose: Promoting education, social entrepreneurship, and leadership
- Chairperson: Ariane de Rothschild
- Deputy Chairperson: Michael Kliger
- Website: www.edrf.org.il

The Edmond de Rothschild Foundation (Israel) is a philanthropic foundation founded in Israel by the Rothschild family.

The Foundation operates within the framework of the international network of the Edmond de Rothschild Foundations and continues the Rothschild family's philanthropic heritage of more than 130 years. The Foundation continues the Rothschild family's commitment to the State of Israel, and it invests in agents of change and in the advancement of its new pioneers. The Foundation initiates dozens of projects throughout Israel, aimed at reducing social gaps and fostering young leadership.'

The fundamental of the Foundation's goals is the aspiration to create a just, cohesive, and shared Israeli society that drives deep processes of social change and promotes excellence, diversity, and leadership through higher education. The Foundation works to maximize higher education in as many communities as possible, to promote academic research, to engage artists in social involvement, to invest in economic-social models, and to foster young and committed leadership.

== History ==
The Edmond de Rothschild Foundation (IL) was founded by the Baron Edmond de Rothschild, the grandson of Edmond James de Rothschild. While his grandfather made his mark on land acquisition, Baron Edmond de Rothschild is remembered for his contribution to the industrialization of Israel and his monetary contributions to educational and cultural institutions.

At the end of the 1950s, the Rothschild family transferred the Caesarea land (some 30,000 dunams (3,000 ha)) to the Edmond de Rothschild Foundation (IL) and invited the state to be a partner in the Foundation. The model according to which the foundation operates is unique, in that all proceeds from the development of the Caesarea community are transferred from the subsidiaries of The Edmond de Rothschild Foundation (IL), the Caesarea Development Corporation and the Caesarea Properties Corporation to the foundation. This process contributes to the advancement of education and higher education in Israel.

Following Baron Edmond de Rothschild's death in 1997, the banking and philanthropic foundations of the family transferred to his son Baron Benjamin de Rothschild. Baron Benjamin de Rothschild and his wife, Ariane de Rothschild, led the Rothschild Foundation (IL) in Israel as part of the Rothschild Foundation's network of educators in the world.

== The Foundation Vision ==
The Foundation seeks to motivate social change processes through many projects across Israel, and provide opportunities for empowerment. The Foundation leads, develops and supports social entrepreneurship and works to achieve higher education, entrepreneurship, art and academic research.

== The Foundation Operation Fields ==
To realize its vision, the Edmond de Rothschild Foundation (IL) operates in the following five areas:

- Ensuring access to and success in higher education - towards narrowing the gaps in Israeli society, by advancing social mobility among young people from peripheral populations through the acquisition of higher education and its translation into commensurate employment.
- Academic Excellence - towards fostering the next generation of researchers, promoting innovative research, and contributing to the development of professionalism and excellence in philanthropy.
- The arts - towards promoting social impact and involvement through art, cultivating excellence, and upholding a long-standing family tradition of supporting the arts.
- Impact Entrepreneurship - with the goal of creating a measurable business model and encouraging the flow of new funds which would address social and environmental needs.
- Leadership - towards establishing a reserve of young leaders, who will integrate into positions of influence in Israeli society and act to promote social issues. The leadership programs are run by the Edmond De Rothschild Partnerships.

The Edmond de Rothschild Partnerships, established in 2016, strive to reduce disparity in Israeli society and to provide opportunities for young people from socio-geographic peripheries. The organization was established to create one roof for youth and young adult leadership programs, with the aim of establishing the next generation of Israeli leaders based on social worldviews and humanistic principles - reducing social gaps, promoting equal opportunities, solidarity and mutual respect.

== Board of Governors ==
Since Baron Benjamin de Rothschild's death in 2021, his widow, Ariane de Rothschild, has led the activities of the Edmond de Rothschild Foundation (IL) in Israel. In June 2019, Michael Kliger was appointed Deputy Chairman of the Edmond de Rothschild Foundation (IL).

The Board of Governors of the Foundation consists of representatives of the Rothschild family and representatives of the Board of the state.

== Donations ==
The scope of donations has increased over the years, so that in 2015 the amount of donations amounted to about 32 million NIS, in 2018 the volume of donations increased to 86 million NIS. In April 2020, the foundation donated 15 Million NIS to Fund COVID-19 research at the Hebrew University of Jerusalem.

== Agreement with the State ==
In June 2018 an agreement was signed between the State of Israel, the Rothschild House and the Edmond de Rothschild Foundation (IL), according to which the parties agreed to extend the cooperation agreement between them until 2032, ten years from the end of the previous agreement period. As part of the contract, the Edmond de Rothschild Foundation (IL) agreed to contribute between NIS 750 million and NIS 1 billion over three years to promote joint national projects for the Foundation and the State of Israel in the area of higher education.

== The Caesarea Development Corporation ==
The Caesarea Development Corporation acts as the agent of The Edmond de Rothschild Foundation. In 1962, the company was entrusted with investing in the development of the land for residential, industrial and tourism purposes. A large portion of the proceeds are transferred to The Edmond de Rothschild Foundation.

== Caesarea Assets Corporation ==
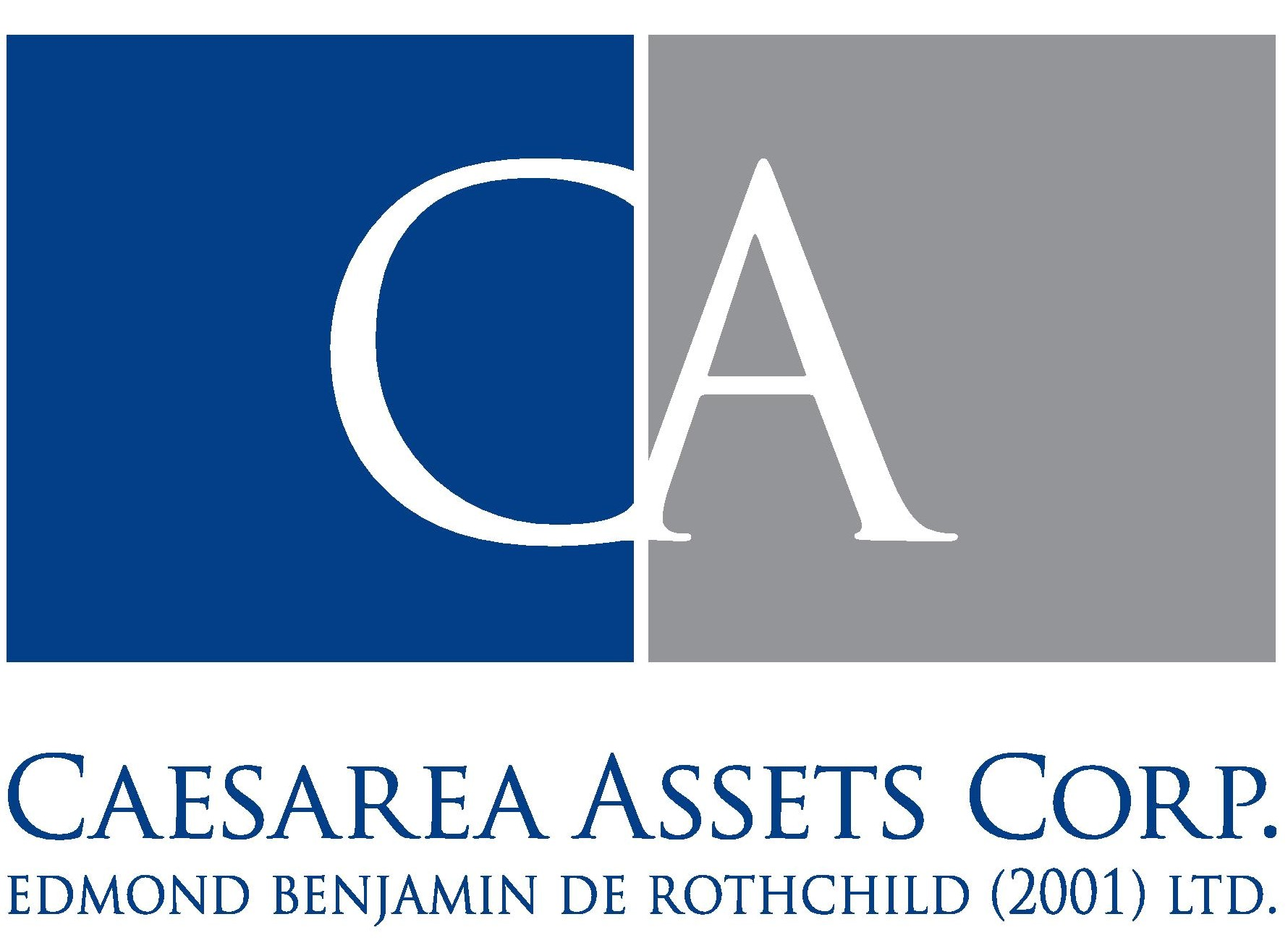
The Caesarea Assets Corporation Logo

The Caesarea Assets Corporation is the real estate development branch of the Foundation. The corporation owns 150,000 square meters of property within the Caesarea Business Park and in 2023 it was developing a further 80,000 square meters of property.
