= Edmond de Rothschild Family Philanthropy =

Swiss philanthropic organization

- Named after: Edmond James de Rothschild (1845–1934)
- Founded: 2005
- Founder: Benjamin de Rothschild; Ariane de Rothschild
- Type: Philanthropic organization
- Headquarters: Geneva, Switzerland
- Fields: Arts, health, entrepreneurship, philanthropy
- Endowment: 17 million US dollars
- Website: www.edmondderothschildphilanthropy.org

Edmond de Rothschild Family Philanthropy, formerly known as Edmond de Rothschild Foundations, is an international philanthropic organization launched in 2005 to regroup a number of historic legacies instituted by heirs of the Edmond de Rothschild family, particularly its Paris and Naples branches, as well as some of the family's contemporary philanthropic initiatives. Named in honor of the philanthropist Edmond James de Rothschild (1845–1934) and led today by the widow of one of his direct descendants, the network operates in the areas of the arts, health, entrepreneurship, and the sharing of best practices in philanthropy. Its primary endowment, based in New York, is valued at 17 million U.S. dollars.

== History ==
=== Origins ===
Throughout its history, the Rothschild family has engaged in charitable and patronage activities to benefit causes spanning from healthcare, scientific research, Jewish welfare, social housing and the arts. James Mayer de Rothschild (1792-1868), son of dynasty founder Mayer Amschel Rothschild (1744-1812) of Frankfurt, established the family's Paris branch. Together with his wife Betty de Rothschild (1805-1886), he was a celebrated donor who supported literature, fine arts, and music through the patronage of figures such as Honoré de Balzac, Eugène Delacroix, Jean-Auguste-Dominique Ingres, Frédéric Chopin, and Gioachino Rossini. Through their charitable initiatives, medical aid was brought to members of the Jewish community through the Hôpital israélite de Paris founded in 1852.

Philanthropy was perpetuated by their son Edmond James de Rothschild (1845-1934), a prolific art collector who made possible the Musée du Louvre's groundbreaking acquisition of the Boscoreale Treasure of ancient Roman silver in 1896. His historic bequest of old master prints and drawings to the Louvre in 1934 led to the creation of the Edmond de Rothschild Collection and paved the way for the establishment of the museum's Département des Arts Graphiques.

=== 20th-century development ===
The early 20th century witnessed a greater institutionalization of the philanthropic aims of the Paris branch. Edmond James de Rothchild, together with his brothers Alphonse de Rothschild (1827-1905) and Gustave de Rothschild (1829-1911), founded the Compagnie du Logement - Fondation Rothschild in 1904; within a decade, they had provided over 1,100 affordable-housing flats in Paris, setting an example for similar social housing initiatives by private philanthropists and, ultimately, the French government.

In 1909, Edmond James de Rothschild assumed the presidency of the Fondation Ophtalmologique Adolphe de Rothschild. This Parisian hospital had been established four years earlier by the testament of Adelheid von Rothschild's uncle, Adolphe Carl von Rothschild (1823-1900) of the family's Naples branch, who built the Château de Pregny in Geneva in 1862. The institution was fostered under the early guidance of his widow, Julie von Rothschild (1830-1907). As the couple left no children, their legacy was entrusted to their French nephew, Edmond James de Rothschild

In 1927, Edmond James de Rothschild created with the Nobel Prize-winning physicist Jean Baptiste Perrin the Institut de Biologie Physico-Chimique, the precursor of today's Centre national de la recherche scientifique (CNRS), France's leading research institution.

The beginning of his engagement in Ottoman Palestine dates to 1882. Firstly, he helped his fellow co-religionists who were fleeing the pogroms in Southern Russia. His acquisition of thousands of dunhams of territory from Ottoman landowners helped the settlement of Jews in Palestine in the early 20th century as they fled the pogroms of Central Europe. Notably working with the Alliance Israélite Universelle, he promoted a multicultural approach to economic development in Palestine (firstly, in grapes and oranges cultivation) prior to the creation of modern Israel. He was seconded in this work by his wife Adelheid von Rothschild (1853-1935). Although he died nearly fifteen years before the founding of the modern State of Israel, Edmond James de Rothschild continues to be known in that country as Hanadiv (the Benefactor).

Maurice de Rothschild, son of Edmond James de Rothschild, supported scientific expeditions, especially in Africa, offering numerous zoological specimens to France's National Museum of Natural History. He was instrumental in the establishment of the Ballets Russes in Paris and donated Renaissance ornaments to the collections of the Musée du Louvre.

In the following generation, Edmond Adolphe de Rothschild (1926-1997) gave furniture, tapestries, and paintings to the Château de Versailles. His gifts of the 18th-century French decorative arts pieces to the Israel Museum in Jerusalem now constitute the Rothschild Room at that institution. He bequeathed an important classical vase (Le Don de la Vigne) to the Musée d'Art et d'Histoire of Geneva through a donation carried out by his wife, Nadine de Rothschild, in 1998.

In France, Edmond Adolphe de Rothschild supported the children's welfare association Œuvre pour la protection des enfants juifs (OPEJ), originally founded to aid children of Jewish victims of the Vichy-era deportations. He became its president in 1969, offering OPEJ the Château de Maubuisson north of Paris (Val d'Oise). Under his guidance, the OPEJ was opened to all children regardless of faith or family background in 1981. Nadine de Rothschild continued this work after her husband's death. The institution has been presided by members of his family ever since.

In 1957, Edmond Adolphe de Rothschild sealed a partnership with the State of israel to create a sustainable philanthropic model for the support of higher education in that country. Ownership of his family's lands in Caesarea was transferred to the Edmond de Rothschild Foundation (Israel), which receives all income from residential, tourism and industrial development via the Caeserea Development Corporation and Caeserea Assets Corporation.

=== Legacy transformation since 2005 ===
In order to transform these long-standing legacies into a single network and transition from traditional giving to strategic philanthropy, Benjamin and Ariane de Rothschild launched the newly instituted Edmond de Rothschild Foundations in 2005.

A number of historic relationships were continued through this transition. Oversight of the Edmond de Rothschild Collection is maintained at the Musée du Louvre in Paris, and the Edmond de Rothschild Foundations supported the Louvre's 2008-2014 renovation of its 18th-century furniture galleries. The Adolphe de Rothschild Foundation Hospital, created in 1905, underwent a deep transformation starting in 2010 to deepen its specialization in the treatment and research on the eye and the brain. In 2012, the OPEJ was reorganized in partnership with the French national welfare services as the Fondation OPEJ - Baron Edmond de Rothschild.

== Organization ==
The Edmond de Rothschild Foundations are composed of various structures, several of which rely on funding from the New York-based Edmond de Rothschild Foundation valued at 17 million US dollars in 2023.

- Mémorial A. de Rothschild, a legacy of the Hôpital Ophtamologique of Geneva (Switzerland, 1900)
- Hôpital Fondation Ophtalmologique Adolphe de Rothschild (France, 1905)
- Fondation Edmond de Rothschild pour le développement de la recherche scientifique (France, 1921, 1930, 1932), dissolved in 2025
- Fondation OPEJ - Baron Edmond de Rothschild (France, 2012), formerly Œuvre pour la protection des enfants juifs (France, 1946)
- Edmond de Rothschild Foundation (Israel, 1958)
- Edmond de Rothschild Foundation (United States, 1972)
- Edmond de Rothschild Foundation (Switzerland, 1982)
- Fondation Maurice et Noémie de Rothschild (Switzerland, 2001), dissolved in 2024
- Fundación Ariane de Rothschild (Spain, 2004)
- ERFIP Foundation (Switzerland, 2013)

== Activities ==
Since 2005, venture philanthropy has been applied in all new programs and partnerships undertaken by the Edmond de Rothschild Foundations based on the theory of change methodology to support the arts, health, entrepreneurship, and research-based philanthropic innovation. Programs are created in partnership with non-profit organizations, governments and public entities, development finance institutions (DFIs) and other international foundations.

=== Arts ===
Arts programs are co-developed with partners to support artistic practices oriented towards citizenship and social impact. Programs in social practice art have been supported through partnerships with various cultural institutions: In New York with the Solomon R. Guggenheim Museum for the creation of the "Guggenheim Social Practice" and with the Jewish Museum for exhibitions including "Unorthodox"; In Spain with the Daniel and Nina Carasso Foundation and the city of Madrid for the initiative "Una Ciudad Muchos Mundos" and in Paris with the École nationale supérieure des beaux-arts to launch the AIMS program (Artistes intervenant en milieu scolaire). The Edmond de Rothschild Foundation in Tel Aviv has sponsored programs in design at Shenkar College and the Benzalel Academy of Arts and Design. Musical programs have been conceived in conjunction with the Carnegie Hall, notably by bringing the program "Ensemble Connect" to Paris, and, in Spain, with Catalonian conductor Jordi Savall to promote refugee musicians across Europe. Theater and dance partners have included the Théâtre national de Strasbourg, the Odéon-Théâtre de l'Europe and the Festival d'Avignon with "1er Acte", the Spanish youth theater company La Joven with "Razas", and French choreographer Abou Lagraa's company La Baraka with "Premier(s) Pas".

=== Health ===
Initiatives in health are based primarily on the management and development of the Hôpital Fondation Adolphe de Rothschild in Paris in close collaboration with the French Ministry of Health and the Agence régionale de santé. It became a teaching hospital with partnerships including the Harvard University in the United States, the Kyoto University in Japan and the Hadassah Medical Center in Jerusalem. Fields of expertise include stroke, Parkinson's disease, multiple sclerosis, neurosurgery, endovascular treatment, medical imaging, infant epilepsy, cataracts, artificial retinas and genetics.

The Edmond de Rothschild Foundations helped set up "2nd Chance", an organization initiated in 2010 by Swiss doctors to provide medical training and access to reconstructive surgery in vulnerable regions and post-conflict situations in Africa.

=== Entrepreneurship ===
The social economy approach is implemented by Edmond de Rothschild Foundations through networks of experts and professionals who provide mentorship and investment opportunities to entrepreneurs in Europe, West Africa, Israel and the United States. Business models are based on the principle of convergence to favor inclusive growth, social impact, and technological innovation while proving financial viability. In 2014, through a partnership with the Swiss Agency for Development and Cooperation and the École Polytechnique Fédérale de Lausanne, the Edmond de Rothschild Foundation launched the Moocs for Africa program to improve science and technology education in French-speaking African countries, specifically creating tools for future engineering entrepreneurs. In Madrid, the impact entrepreneurship organization UnLtd Spain focuses on agribusiness, healthcare and smart cities. In Paris, Tekhnè, a tech-for-good incubator for startups, was created through Liberté Living-Lab. A French-based incubator and entrepreneurship accelerator, Singa, is present in ten countries to support migrants and refugees. Portugal-based Maze X, the first pan-European entrepreneurship accelerator, was created in partnership with the Calouste Gulbenkian Foundation.

The Ariane de Rothschild Fellowship, established in 2009, is a transversal program blending business training, social sciences scholarship and cross-cultural dialogue. Its partners have included the Columbia Business School and Cambridge University's Judge Business School.

=== Research in philanthropy ===
Since 2005, the Edmond de Rothschild Foundations' new model has redefined the effectiveness of philanthropy in the 21st century by establishing philanthropy as an academic discipline.

At the University of Geneva, the Edmond de Rothschild Foundations sponsors the Philanthropy Center and the Edmond de Rothschild Foundation Chair in behavioral psychology. Edmond de Rothschild Foundations supports the chair in Philanthropy at the École supérieure des sciences économiques et commerciales (ESSEC) in Paris and maintain a partnership with the Fondation de France to develop the École de Philanthropie to introduce the concept of philanthropic action to French school pupils.

In 2013, the EmpoweR Families for Innovative Philanthropy (ERFIP) platform was launched to generate exchange among family offices and foundations in emerging countries in Africa, Asia and Latin America to harness philanthropic activity based on engagement with local shareholders and local business communities, as well as more contemporary subjects such as sustainable development.

== Bibliography ==
- Antébi, Elizabeth (2003). Edmond de Rothschild: L'homme qui racheta la Terre Sainte (in French). Paris: Éditions du Rocher. ISBN 978-2-268-04442-2.
- Collard, Claude; Aspey, Mélanie (2012). Les Rothschild en France au XIXe siècle (in French). Paris: Bibliothèque Nationale de Paris.
- Prevost-Marcilhacy, Pauline (2016). Les Rothschild: Une dynastie de mécènes en France au XIXe siècle (in French). Vol. 3. Paris: Somogy Éditions d'Art. ISBN 978-2-7177-2432-5.

== See also ==
- Edmond de Rothschild Group
