= Netanya–Sapir railway station =

Railway station in Israel

Netanya–Sapir נתניה – ספיר
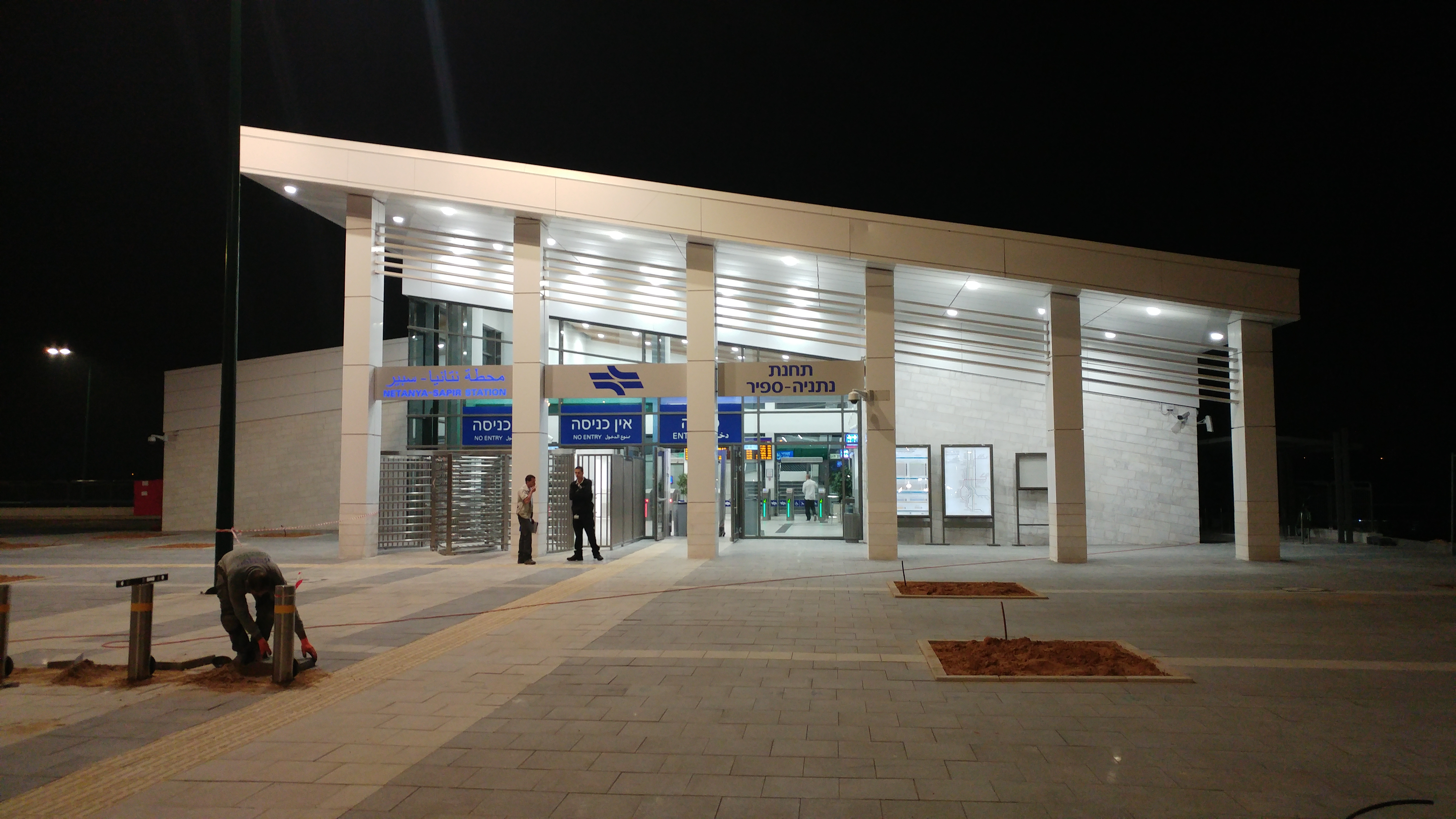

General information
- Location: Yad Harutzim 13, Netanya
- Coordinates: 32°16′49″N 34°51′54″E
- Platforms: 2
- Tracks: 2

Construction
- Parking: 283 spaces
- Cycle facilities: 34 spaces
- Accessible: yes

History
- Opened: 5 November 2016; 9 years ago
- Electrified: 17 September 2022; 3 years ago

Passengers
- 2019: 1,155,205
- Rank: 36 out of 68
Location

Netanya–Sapir railway station (Hebrew: תחנת הרכבת נתניה – ספיר, Taḥanat HaRakevet Netanya Sapir) is an Israel Railways station located in Kiryat Sapir (also known as Sapir/Poleg industrial zone) in southern Netanya, on the North-South coastal line.

== History ==
The plan to build the station was initiated in March 2001. The initial plan was for the station to be built by a private developer who would build a commercial center nearby. In September 2002, the doubling of the coastal railway from two to four tracks on the Haifa-Tel Aviv section was also approved. This is with the aim of allowing suburban and intercity trains to travel on the four tracks simultaneously.

The station plan was approved by the District Planning and Building Committee in June 2012. In March 2014, the tender for the construction of the station was published, and the station opened on November 5, 2016. The cost of building the station was approximately 70 million NIS.

In 2021, work began at the station to install an overhead electrical supply system by the Spanish company SEMI, and on September 3, 2022, the first electric train ran at the station. The system provides an alternating voltage of 25,000 volts at a frequency of 50 Hz and allows mobile railway equipment with a pantograph to operate at the station. Israel Railways currently has Bombardier Trax locomotives hauling double-deck cars from the same manufacturer and Desiro HC electric railcars manufactured by Siemens.

Preceding station	Israel Railways	Following station
Netanya towards Binyamina	Binyamina–Beersheba	Beit Yehoshua towards Be'er Sheva–Center

== Station layout ==
Platform numbers increase in an East-to-West direction

Side platform
Platform 1	Nahariya–Modi'in trains toward Modi'in–Center do not stop here → Nahariya–Beersheba and Karmiel–Beersheba trains toward Be'er Sheva–Center do not stop here → Binyamina–Beersheba trains toward Be'er Sheva–Center (Beit Yehoshua) → Netanya–Rehovot trains toward Rehovot (peak hours only) do not stop here → Netanya–Beit Shemesh trains toward Beit Shemesh (peak hours only) do not stop here → Night Train toward Ben Gurion Airport does not stop here →
Platform 2	← Nahariya–Modi'in and Nahariya–Beersheba trains toward Nahariya do not stop here ← Karmiel–Beersheba trains toward Karmiel do not stop here ← Binyamina–Beersheba trains toward Binyamina (Netanya) ← Netanya–Rehovot and Netanya–Beit Shemesh trains toward Netanya (peak hours only) do not stop here ← Night Train toward Nahariya does not stop here
Side platform

== Ridership ==
Passengers boarding and disembarking by year
Year	Passengers	Rank	Source
2021	630,966 (▲223,382)	32 of 66 (▲2)	2021 Freedom of Information Law Annual Report
2020	407,584 (▼747,621)	34 of 68 (▲2)	2020 Freedom of Information Law Annual Report
2019	1,155,205	36 of 68	2019 Freedom of Information Law Annual Report
