= Hadera–West railway station =

Railway station in Israel

Hadera–West חדרה – מערב
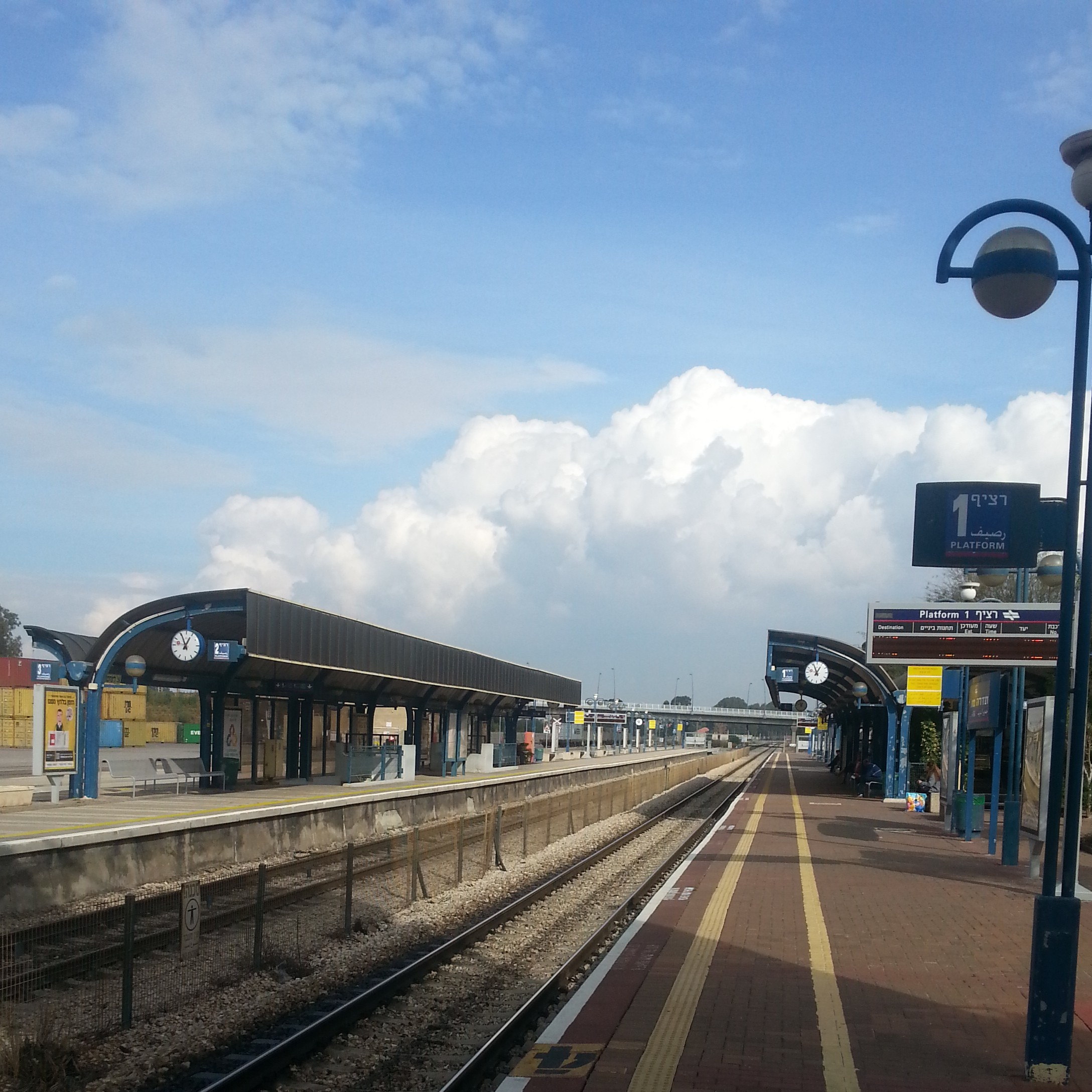

General information
- Location: Train Rd. Street, Hadera
- Coordinates: 32°26′18″N 34°53′57″E
- Platforms: 3
- Tracks: 3

Construction
- Parking: 330 spaces

History
- Opened: 14 May 1953; 73 years ago
- Electrified: 11 February 2023; 3 years ago

Passengers
- 2019: 2,430,825
- Rank: 18 out of 68
Location

Hadera–Ma'arav (West) railway station (Hebrew: תחנת הרכבת חדרה – מערב, Tahanat HaRakevet Hadera Ma'arav) is an Israel Railways passenger station and freight terminal located in the city of Hadera. It serves the city, including its large industrial zones, as well as other small communities in the area.

== Location ==
The station is part of the north–south coastal line. It is located at the western edge of the city of Hadera, at the southern end of Dereh HaRakevet (Hebrew: דרך הרכבת, The Train Road).

== History ==
Until 1953, Hadera had only one railway station, the Hadera East railway station, which was located at the eastern edge of the town. This station was constructed in the 1920s by the British during their Mandate for Palestine, and was connected north to Haifa and south to Lod and Tel Aviv (through Petah Tikva) via the Eastern Railway, a line which lay mostly defunct between 1969 and 2026.

The new and improved "Coastal Railway Line" was constructed during the early 1950s, and shortened the rail journey between Haifa and Tel Aviv by 20 minutes (from 1 hour and 20 minutes to just over 1 hour). The new railway line connects to the old one at the Remez railway junction which is about 2.5 km north of the Hadera East railway station, which meant that Hadera East could not be served by the new coastal Haifa–Tel Aviv passenger service.

In order to include Hadera in the improved Haifa–Tel Aviv passenger service, the new Hadera West railway station was built 5 km south of the intersection of the Eastern and Coastal Railway Lines at Remez junction and 5 km west of the old railway station. The new station opened to the public on May 14, 1953. The location of the station, then far from the city center, meant that passenger numbers were fairly low until the 2000s. Ih the meantime, Hadera East railway station was closed to passengers in 1969 and only reopened in 2026 as part of the rebuilding of the Eastern Railway.

Hadera West station underwent reconstruction and preservation during the early 1990s.

With the inauguration of the new Tel Aviv suburban service (Binyamina/Netanya–Tel Aviv–Rehovot/Ashkelon Suburban Service) in the late 1990s Hadera Ma'arav ceased to be a station on both the Jerusalem–Tel Aviv–Haifa InterCity Service and the Beer Sheva–Tel Aviv–Haifa–Nahariya InterCity Service and became a suburban station on the Tel Aviv–Binyamina suburban service.

In 2001, the station was updated to the present passenger station format of Israel Railways.

== Future plans ==
In the future, a combined public transport hub, to include a new central bus station, is expected to be built at the site and will replace Hadera's current central bus station, located closer to the historic city center. As part of this project, the road infrastructure around the station will be significantly upgraded and Hadera West will serve as the only intermediate stop on a new high-speed train between Haifa and Tel Aviv which will travel at speeds of up to 250 km/h. As such, Hadera West will replace Binyamina as the key northern transfer station between intercity and suburban trains (currently most intercity trains do not stop at Hadera).

== Design ==
The station consists of a side platform and an island platform, numbered 1 to 3 from east to west. Between the side platform and the island platform, there are two parallel tracks, and an additional track to the west of platform 3. Further to the west there are several tracks in the station's freight terminal as well as stacked container and cargo storage area.

The station hall is located to the east of the rail tracks. The two platforms are interconnected by a pedestrian tunnel and bridge. A lift operates on both platforms.

Platform 1 is used for southbound suburban trains, platform 2 for northbound suburban trains. Platform 3 is used for suburban trains when it is necessary to allow an InterCity train to get ahead of the suburban train in Hadera (instead of the usual Binyamina) in order to reduce delays.

== Train service ==
Hadera Ma'arav (West) is a station on the Tel Aviv suburban line (Binyamina/Netanya–Tel Aviv–Rehovot/Ashkelon Suburban Service). Almost all Inter-City trains pass through this station without stopping, except on Saturdays and holidays, a few morning trains, a few evening and some late night trains. The station is situated between Caesarea-Pardes Hanna railway station to the north and Netanya railway station to the south.

Timetable highlights:

- Suburban Service:
  - On weekdays, the station is served by 30 southbound and 29 northbound suburban trains. The first train departs at 06:27 southbound and at 06:39 northbound. The last train arrives at 22:27 southbound and at 21:39 northbound .
  - On Fridays and holiday evenings, the station is served by 17 suburban trains in each direction. The first train departs at 06:42 southbound and at 07:09 northbound. The last train arrives at 14:42 southbound and at 15:09 northbound.
  - On Saturdays and holidays, at summer time the station is served by 3 southbound suburban trains (21:03, 22:44, 23:16) and two northbound suburban trains at 22:07, 22:42. At winter time the station is served by 3 southbound suburban trains (19:03, 20:44, 21:16) and two northbound suburban trains at 20:07, 20:42.
- Inter-City Service:
  - On weekdays, the station is served by five night southbound trains (01:07-05:07) and five northbound trains (01:35-05:35). Then three morning southbound trains (05:30, 06:58, 07:58) and one morning northbound train (06:08). Three evening northbound trains (17:07-19:07). And the last, one southbound trains at 23:22 and three northbound trains at 22:34, 23:16, 00:16.
  - On Fridays and holiday evenings, the station is served by five night southbound trains (01:07-05:07) and five northbound trains (01:35-05:37). Then one morning southbound train at 05:44 and one northbound train at 06:22.
  - On Saturdays and holidays, in the summer time the station is served by four southbound trains (21:52, 22:04, 23:46, 00:35) and three northbound trains (23:16, 00:07, 00:37). At winter time the station is served by five southbound trains (19:52, 20:04, 21:46, 22:35, 00:35) and four northbound trains (21:16, 22:07, 22:37, 00:37).
  - Since November 14th 2026, there are direct train services every hour from Hadera West to Jerusalem–Yitzhak Navon via Netanya, Beit Yehoshua, Herzliya, all Tel Aviv stations and Ben Gurion Airport.

Preceding station	Israel Railways	Following station
Haifa–Hof HaCarmel towards Karmiel	Karmiel–Beersheba	Herzliya towards Be'er Sheva–Center
Caesarea–Pardes Hanna towards Binyamina	Binyamina–Beersheba	Netanya towards Be'er Sheva–Center
Binyamina towards Nahariya	Night Train Nahariya–Ben Gurion Airport	Netanya towards Ben Gurion Airport

== Station layout ==
Platform numbers increase in an East-to-West direction

Side platform
Platform 1	Nahariya–Modi'in trains toward Modi'in–Center do not stop here → Nahariya–Beersheba trains toward Be'er Sheva–Center do not stop here → Karmiel–Beersheba trains toward Be'er Sheva–Center (Herzliya) → Binyamina–Beersheba trains toward Be'er Sheva–Center (Netanya) → Night Train toward Ben Gurion Airport (Netanya) →
Platform 2	← Nahariya–Modi'in and Nahariya–Beersheba trains toward Nahariya do not stop here ← Karmiel–Beersheba trains toward Karmiel (Haifa–Hof HaCarmel) ← Binyamina–Beersheba trains toward Binyamina (Caesarea–Pardes Hanna) ← Night Train toward Nahariya (Binyamina)
Island platform
Platform 3	← Bypass track – not in ordinary use →

== Ridership ==
Passengers boarding and disembarking by year
Year	Passengers	Rank	Source
2021	1,424,860 (▲545,748)	16 of 66 (▲2)	2021 Freedom of Information Law Annual Report
2020	879,112 (▼1,551,713)	18 of 68	2020 Freedom of Information Law Annual Report
2019	2,430,825	18 of 68	2019 Freedom of Information Law Annual Report

== Public transport connections ==
Hadera Ma'arav (West) station is accessible mainly by private cars since it is situated in a fairly remote location approximately 2 km from the city's center. It is located off the main road which connects central Hadera with the Coastal Highway and the Giv'at Olga neighborhood to the west.

The only public transport link is line 15, 17 and 22 operated by Egged, which is synchronized with train arrival/departure times, but is a one-way route, going to the railway station in the mornings and returning from the railway station in the evenings. Additional buses stop on the road leading from Hadera to the Coastal Highway, at a point approximately a 700m walk northeast of the station entrance.

== Facilities ==
- Payphone
- Ticket cashier
- Ticket machine
- Buffet
- Parking lot
- Toilet
