= Caesarea Development Corporation =

Nonprofit organization in Caesarea, Israel

- Caesarea Edmond Benjamin de Rothschild Development Corporation
- Formation: 1952
- Headquarters: Caesarea
- Location: Israel
- CEO: Michael Krasenti
- Parent organization: Edmond de Rothschild Foundation
- Website: https://caesarea.com/en/

The Caesarea Development Corporation Is an Israeli nonprofit and the executive branch of the Caesarea Edmond de Rothschild Foundation. It is the only private organization to manage an Israeli locality, and receives a share of Caesarea residents' tax revenue, alongside the Hof HaCarmel Regional Council. As of 2013, the corporation's assets are valued at 910.3 million NIS.

== History ==
The corporation was established in 1952 by the Edmond de Rothschild Foundation (ERF). Shortly thereafter, the Foundation gave 35,000 Dunams in the Caesarea area to the Israeli Government, which it then leased back to the foundation until 2148. In October 1958, the Israeli government and Edmond Adolphe de Rothschild signed a memorandum, agreeing to establish a joint venture for the development of Caesarea and stipulating a three-year trial period. Shortly after the end of that period, in January 1962, Finance minister Levi Eshkol signed an agreement with Rothschild, which placed the corporation under a fund, co-owned by the ERF and the Israeli government, and stipulated that its proceeds would go towards the development of higher education.

The agreement was extended in 1977 for a 15-year period, and in 1989, it was amended and extended until 2022 by Finance minister Shimon Peres, Among the amendments was the establishment of a minimum of donations for higher education. In 2018, the agreement was extended until 2032 under the condition that the corporation increase its yearly donations, provide a one time, 750 million NIS donation to higher education, and grant nearby Or Akiva land for the construction of 2,000 homes.

== Structure and legal status ==
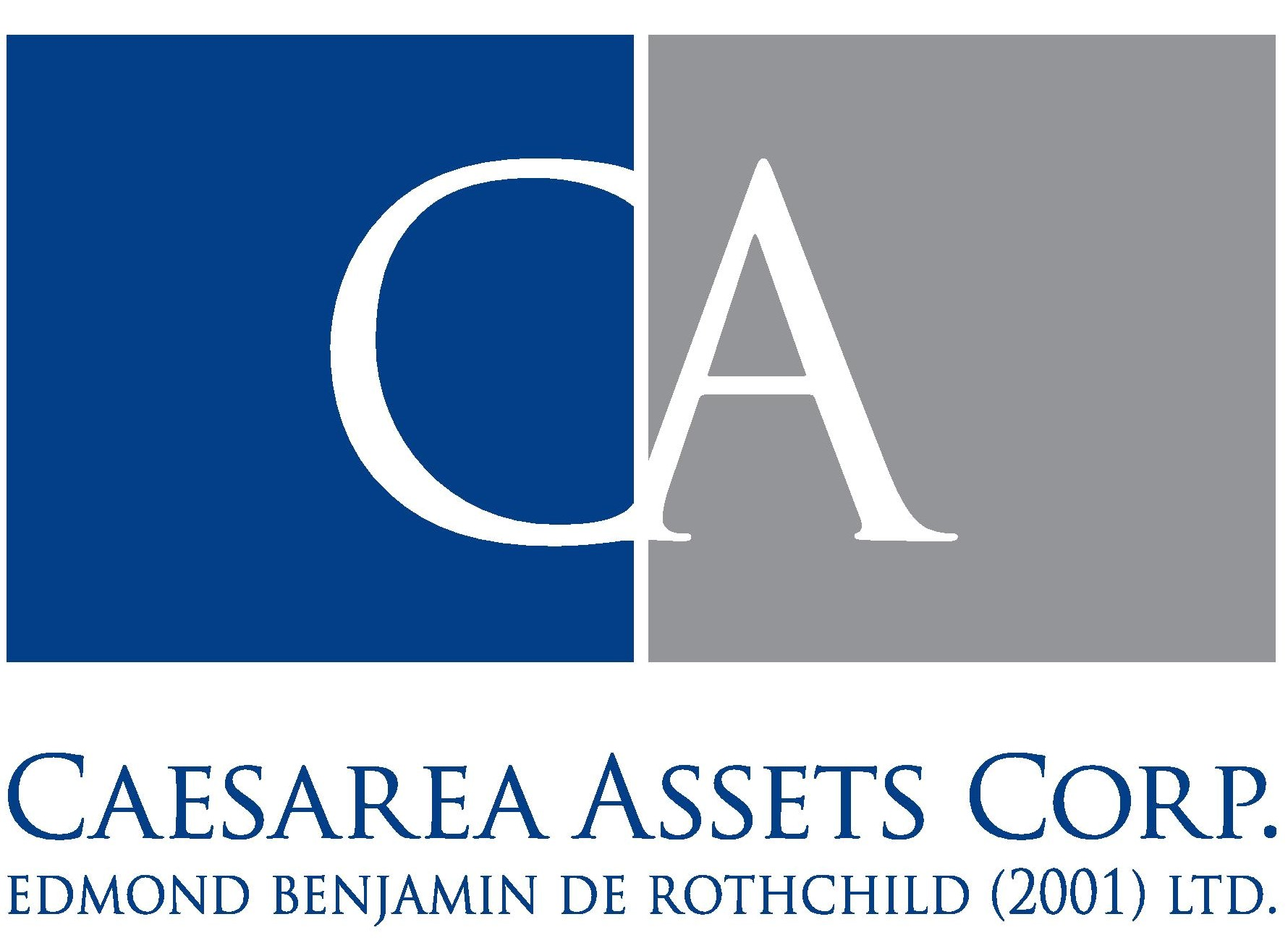
The Caesarea Assets Corporation Logo

The Caesarea Development Corporation is owned by the Caesarea Development Fund, a joint venture between the Israeli Government and the ERF. The corporation does not pay any income tax. It works in cooperation with the Caesarea Assets Corporation, another subsidiary of the Fund, which handles real-estate development in the Caesarea area. Since 2009, the CEO of both corporations is Michael Krasenti.

== Activities ==
The foundation operates on the lands leased by the Caesarea Edmond De Rothschild Foundation from the state of Israel. It regulates the designs of housing projects in the area, and handles municipal activities such as garbage collection, gardening and street maintenance. It receives revenue from the sale of land in Caesarea, as well as fees paid by residents. Until 2004, the corporation was also responsible for local education and the enforcement of housing rules, which are now under the jurisdiction of Hof HaCarmel Regional Council, which Caesarea became part of that year.

Per its 1962 agreement with the Israeli Government, the Foundation's profits are meant to go towards the development of Higher Education in Israel. According to a 2011 report by State Comptroller Micha Lindenstrauss, the Corporation donated small amounts to the development of higher education until 1989. Between 2005 and 2010, the Corporation donated 167 million NIS to higher education, beneath the 185 million stipulated by its 1989 agreement with the Israeli government.
