= Caesarea (modern town) =

Town in north-central Israel

Caesarea: קֵיסָרְיָה (Hebrew); قيساريّة (Arabic)

Hebrew transcription(s)
  - Standard: Keisarya
  - Official: Qesarya
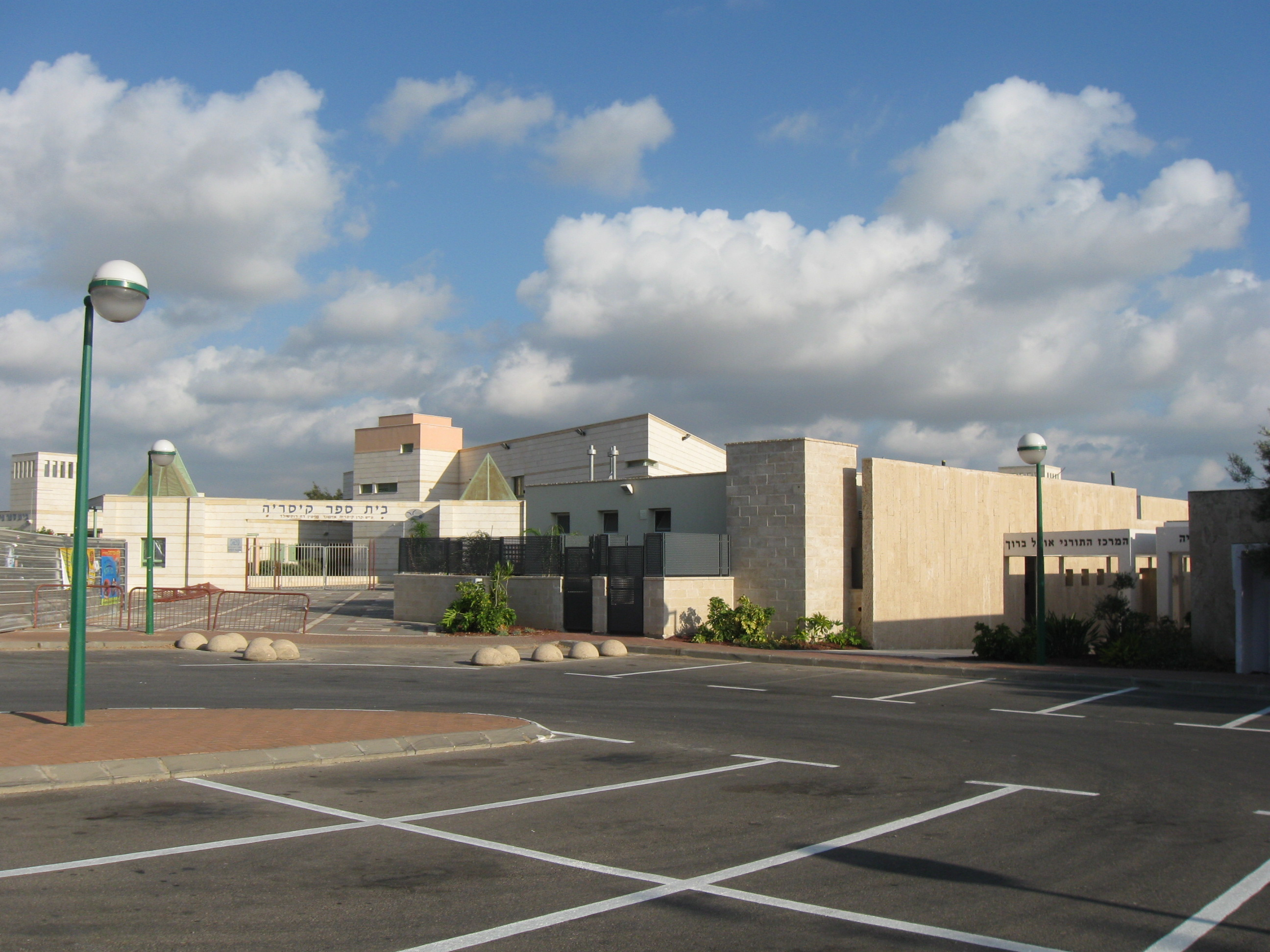
- A school in Caesarea

- Location within Haifa region of Israel Location within Israel
- Coordinates: 32°30′10″N 34°54′20″E
- Country: Israel
- District: Haifa
- Subdistrict: Hadera
- Council: Hof HaCarmel
- Founded: 30 BCE (Herodian city); 1101 (Crusader castle); 1884 (Bosniak village); 1952 (Israeli town)
- Area: 35,000 dunams (35 km^{2}; 14 sq mi)
- Population (2024): 5,633
  - Density: 160/km^{2} (420/sq mi)

Caesarea (/ˌsɛzəˈriːə, ˌsɛs-, ˌsiːz-/ SE(E)Z-ə-REE-ə, SESS-) (Note: Hebrew: קֵיסָרְיָה, romanized: Qēsarya, pronounced [keiˈsaʁja]; Arabic: قيساريّة) (Note: Also transliterated as Keisarya or Qaysaria,) is an affluent resort town in north-central Israel, which was named after the ancient city of Caesarea Maritima situated 1–2 kilometres (0.62–1.24 mi) to the south in the adjacent Caesarea National Park.

Located midway between Tel Aviv and Haifa on the coastal plain near the city of Hadera, it falls under the jurisdiction of Hof HaCarmel Regional Council. With a population of 5,633, it is the only Israeli locality managed by a private organization, the Caesarea Development Corporation, and also one of the most populous localities not recognized as a local council.

== History ==
=== Caesarea Maritima ===
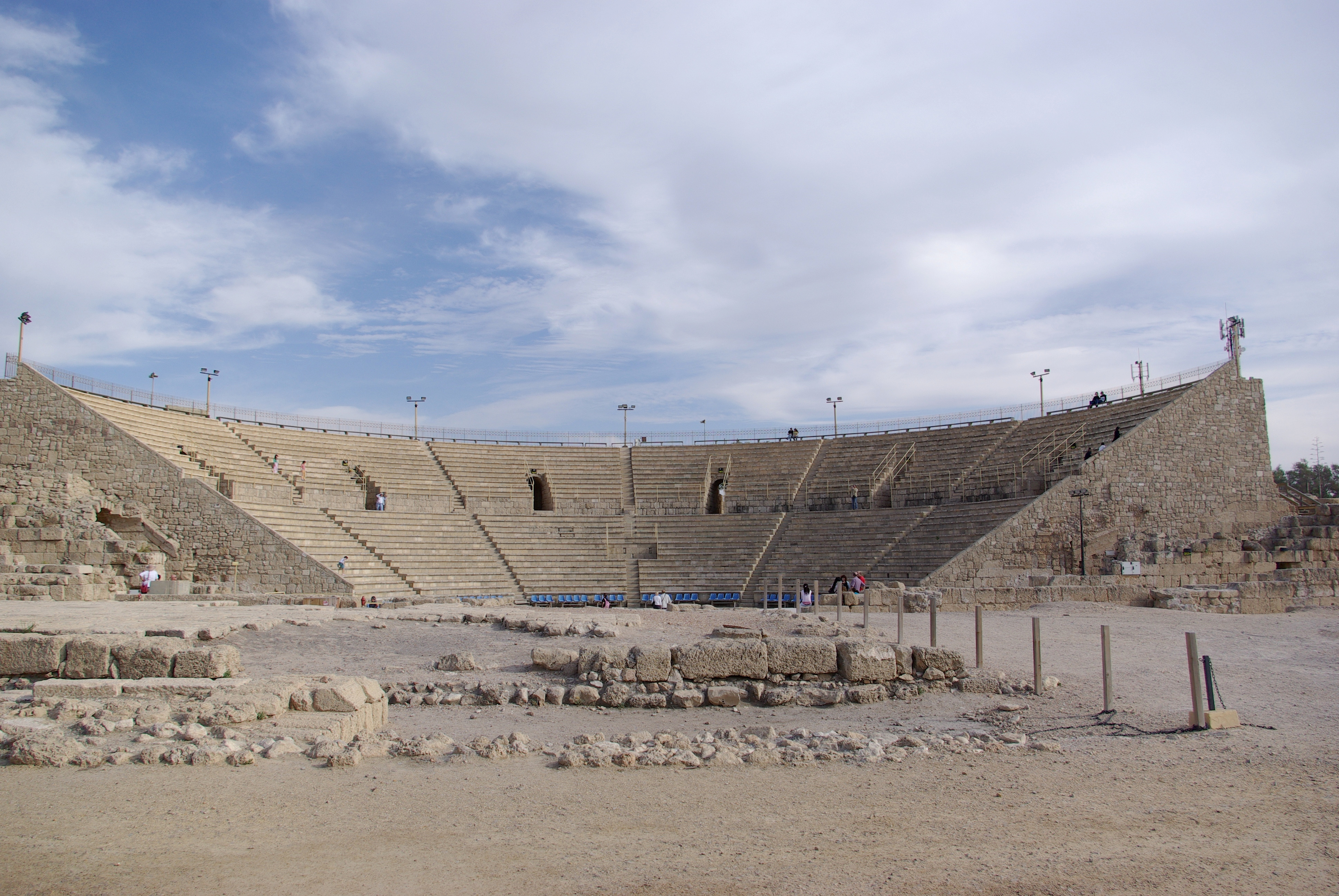
Caesarea Maritima's Roman theatre

The modern town is named after the nearby ancient city of Caesarea Maritima, built by Herod the Great about 25–13 BCE as a major port. It served as an administrative center of the province of Syria and Palestine which came under the Roman Empire rule, and later as the capital of the Byzantine province of Palaestina Prima. During the Muslim rule of the Levant in the 7th century, the city degraded to a small village after the provincial capital was moved to Ramla and had an Arab majority until Crusader conquest. Under the Crusaders it became once again a major port and a fortified city. It was diminished after the Mamluk rule. In 1884, Herzegovinian Muslim immigrants who left Austria-Hungary were settled there by the Ottoman authorities. At the time, Caesarea was a semi-demolished archaeological site. Seferović writes that the Herzegovinian Muslims were completely assimilated into Arab culture. In 1940, kibbutz Sdot Yam was established next to the village. In February 1948, the village was taken by a Palmach unit commanded by Yitzhak Rabin, following an earlier attack on a bus by Lehi militants.

=== Rothschild Caesarea Foundation and Development Corporation ===
After the establishment of the State of Israel, the Rothschild family agreed to transfer most of its land holdings to the new state. A different arrangement was reached for the 35,000 dunams of land the family owned in and around modern Caesarea: after turning over the land to the state, it was leased back (for a period of 200 years) to a new charitable foundation. In his will, Edmond James de Rothschild stipulated that this foundation would further education, arts and culture, and welfare in Israel. The Caesarea Edmond Benjamin de Rothschild Foundation was formed and run based on the funds generated by the sale of Caesarea land which the Foundation is responsible for maintaining. The Foundation is owned half by the Rothschild family, and half by the State of Israel and enjoys a special tax-exempt status.

The Rothschild Caesarea Foundation established the Caesarea Edmond Benjamin de Rothschild Development Corporation Ltd. (CDC; Hebrew: החברה לפיתוח קיסריה אדמונד בנימין דה רוטשילד) in 1952 to act as its operations arm. The company transfers all profits from the development of Caesarea to the Foundation, which in turn contributes to organizations that advance higher education and culture across Israel. The goal of the CDC is to establish a unique community that combines quality of life and safeguarding the environment with advanced industry and tourism.

Today, the Chairman of the Rothschild Caesarea Foundation and the CDC is Ariane de Rothschild, widow of Benjamin de Rothschild, the great-grandson of Baron Edmond de Rothschild.

As well as carrying out municipal services, the CDC markets plots for real-estate development, manages the nearby industrial park, and runs the Caesarea's golf course and country club, Israel's only 18-hole golf course.

Modern Caesarea, or Kesariya, remains today the only locality in Israel managed by a private organization rather than a municipal government. It is one of Israel's most upscale residential communities. The Baron de Rothschild still maintains a home in Caesarea, as do many business tycoons from Israel and abroad.

== Location and structure ==
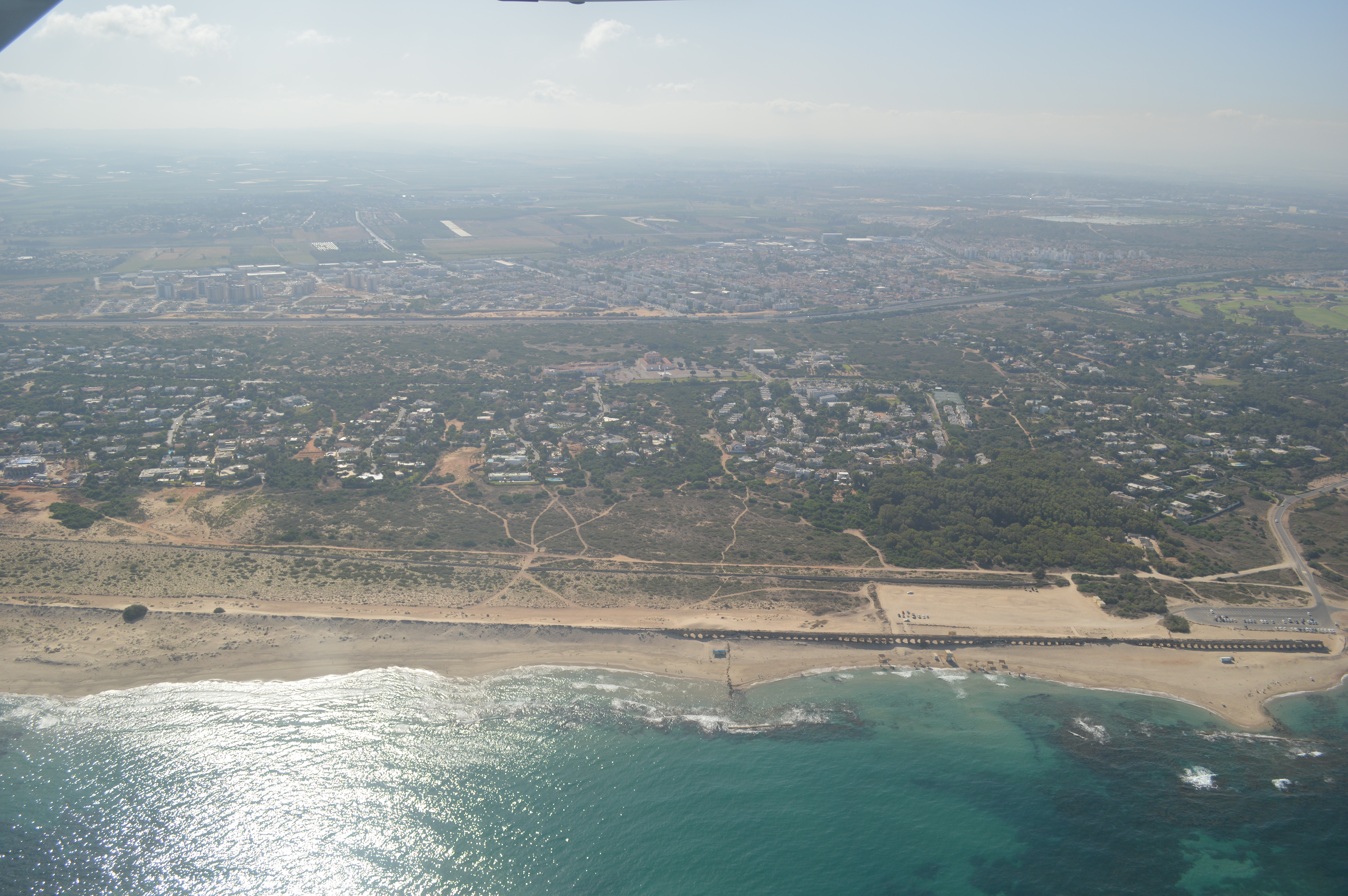
The town from the air

Caesarea is located on the Israeli coastal plain, approximately halfway between the major modern cities of Tel Aviv (45 kilometers [28 mi] to the south) and Haifa (45 kilometers [28 mi] to the north), and 1–2 kilometers (0.62–1.24 mi) north of ancient Caesarea Maritima. It is situated approximately 5 kilometers (3 mi) northwest of the city of Hadera, and is bordered to the east by the Caesarea Industrial Zone and the city of Or Akiva. Directly to the north is the town of Jisr az-Zarqa.

Caesarea is divided into a number of residential zones, known as clusters. The most recent of these to be constructed is Cluster 13, which, like all the clusters, is given a name: in this case, "The Golf Cluster", due to its close proximity to the Caesarea Golf Course. These neighborhoods are affluent, although they vary significantly in terms of average plot size.

== Economy ==
Caesarea is a suburban community with a number of residents commuting to work in Tel Aviv or Haifa.

The Caesarea Business Park is on the fringe of the city. About 170 companies are in the park; they employ about 5,500 people. Industry in the park includes distribution and high-technology services.

The residential neighborhoods have a shopping concourse with a newsagent, supermarket, optician, and bank. A number of restaurants and cafes are scattered across the town, with a number within the ancient port.

== Infrastructure ==
=== Roads ===
- Beyond the eastern boundary of the residential area of Caesarea is Highway 2, Israel's main highway linking Tel Aviv to Haifa. Caesarea is linked to the road by the Caesarea Interchange in the south, and Or Akiva Interchange in the center.
- Slightly further to the east lies Highway 4, providing more local links to Hadera, Binyamina, Zichron Yaakov, and the moshavim and kibbutzim of Emek Hefer.
- Highway 65 starts at the Caesarea Interchange and runs westwards into the Galilee and the cities of Pardes Hanna-Karkur, Umm al-Fahm, and Afula.

=== Rail ===
Caesarea shares a railway station with nearby Pardes Hanna-Karkur, which is situated in the Caesarea Industrial Zone and is served by the suburban line between Binyamina and Tel Aviv, with two trains per hour. The Binyamina Railway Station, a major regional transfer station, is also located nearby.

== Culture ==
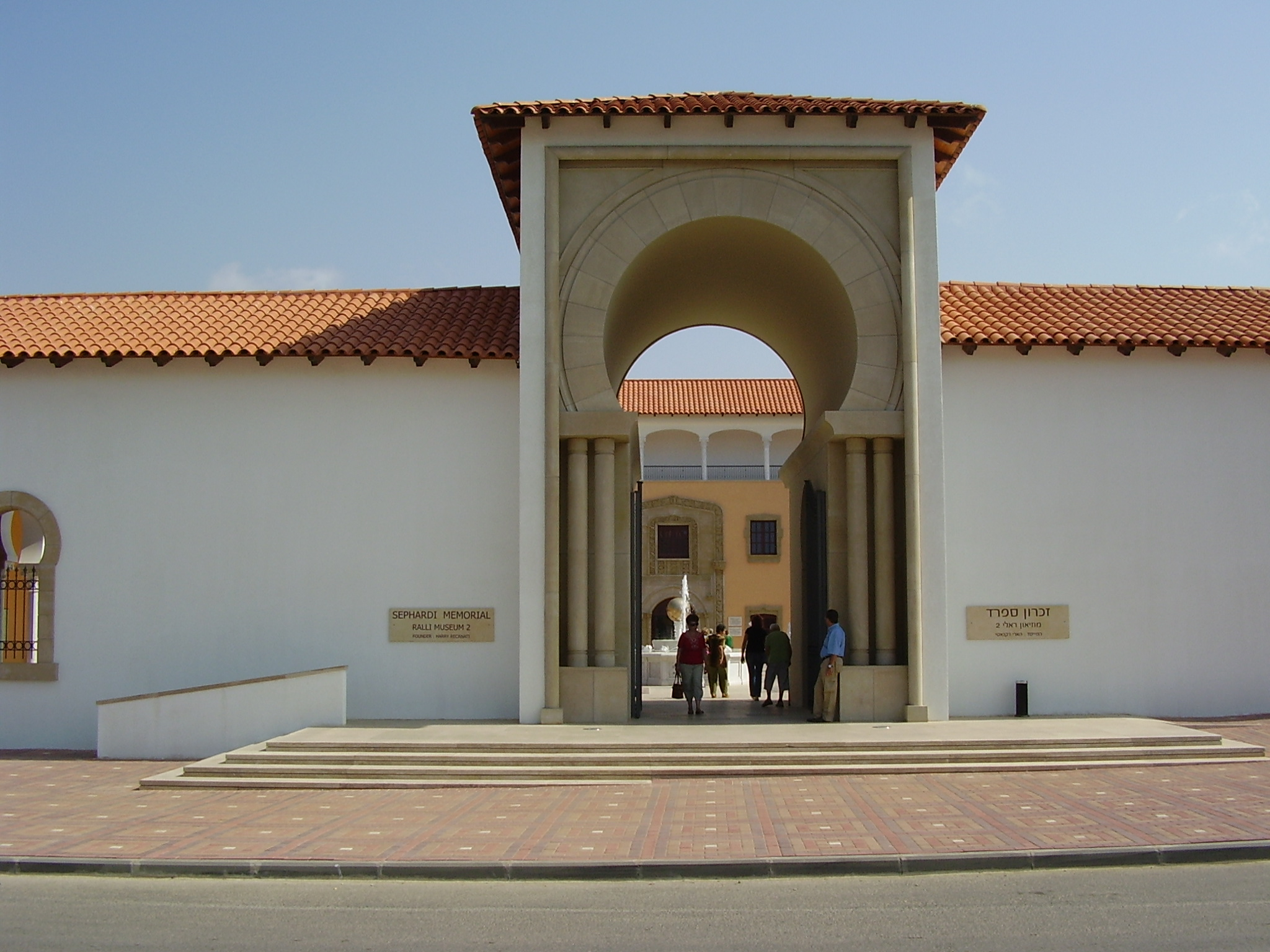
The Ralli Museum in Caesarea

The Roman theatre located at Caesarea Maritima often hosts concerts by major Israeli and international artists, such as Shlomo Artzi, Yehudit Ravitz, Mashina, Deep Purple, Björk, Alanis Morissette, Idan Raichel and his project, as well as the Caesarea Jazz Festival. The Ralli Museum in Caesarea houses a large collection of South American art and several Salvador Dalí originals.

== Sports ==
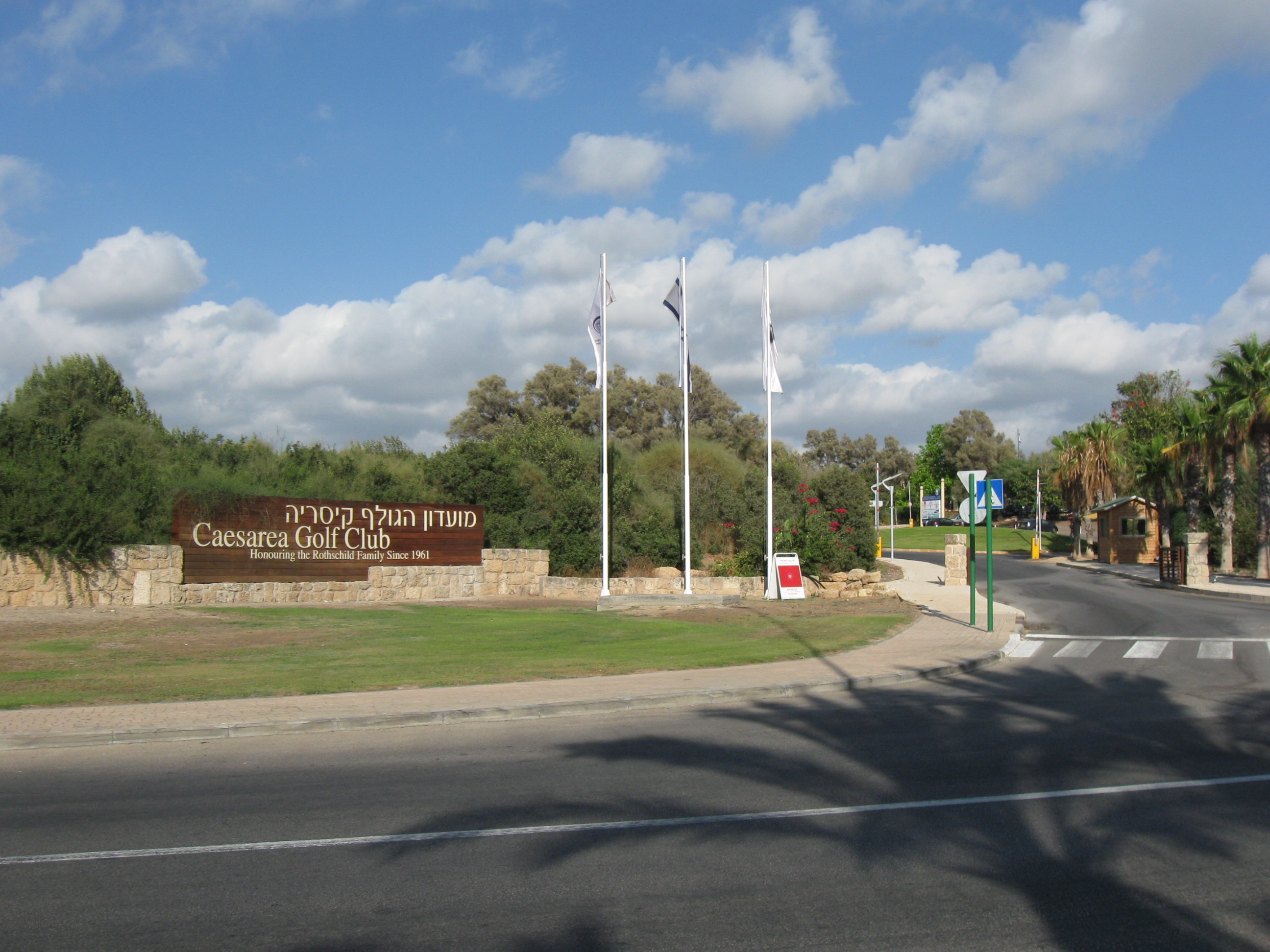
Caesarea Golf and Country Club

Caesarea has the country's only full-sized golf course. The idea for the Caesarea Golf and Country Club originated after James de Rothschild was reminded by the dunes surrounding Caesarea of Scotland's sandy links golf courses. Upon his death, the James de Rothschild Foundation established the course. In 1958, a Golf Club Committee was established, and a course was built. American professional golfer Herman Barron, the first Jewish golfer to win a PGA Tour event, helped develop the course. It was officially opened in 1961 by Abba Eban. The Caesarea Golf Club has hosted international golf competitions every four years in the Maccabiah Games. The course was redesigned and rebuilt by golf course designer Pete Dye in 2007–2009.

== Voting patterns ==
In the 2022 election, 66 percent of voters in Caesarea voted for the parties of the center-left coalition led by Yair Lapid, while 31 percent voted for the parties of the right-wing coalition led by Benjamin Netanyahu and 0.5 percent voted for the Arab parties.

In the 2026 election, 64 percent of voters in Caesarea voted for the parties of the center-left coalition led by Gadi Eisenkot, while 30 percent voted for the parties of the right-wing coalition led by Benjamin Netanyahu and 0.5 percent voted for the Arab parties. An additional 3.7 percent voted for the Reservists, and 1.1 percent voted for Amcha Yisrael. Voter turnout increased 21 percent from the 2022 election.

== Notable residents ==
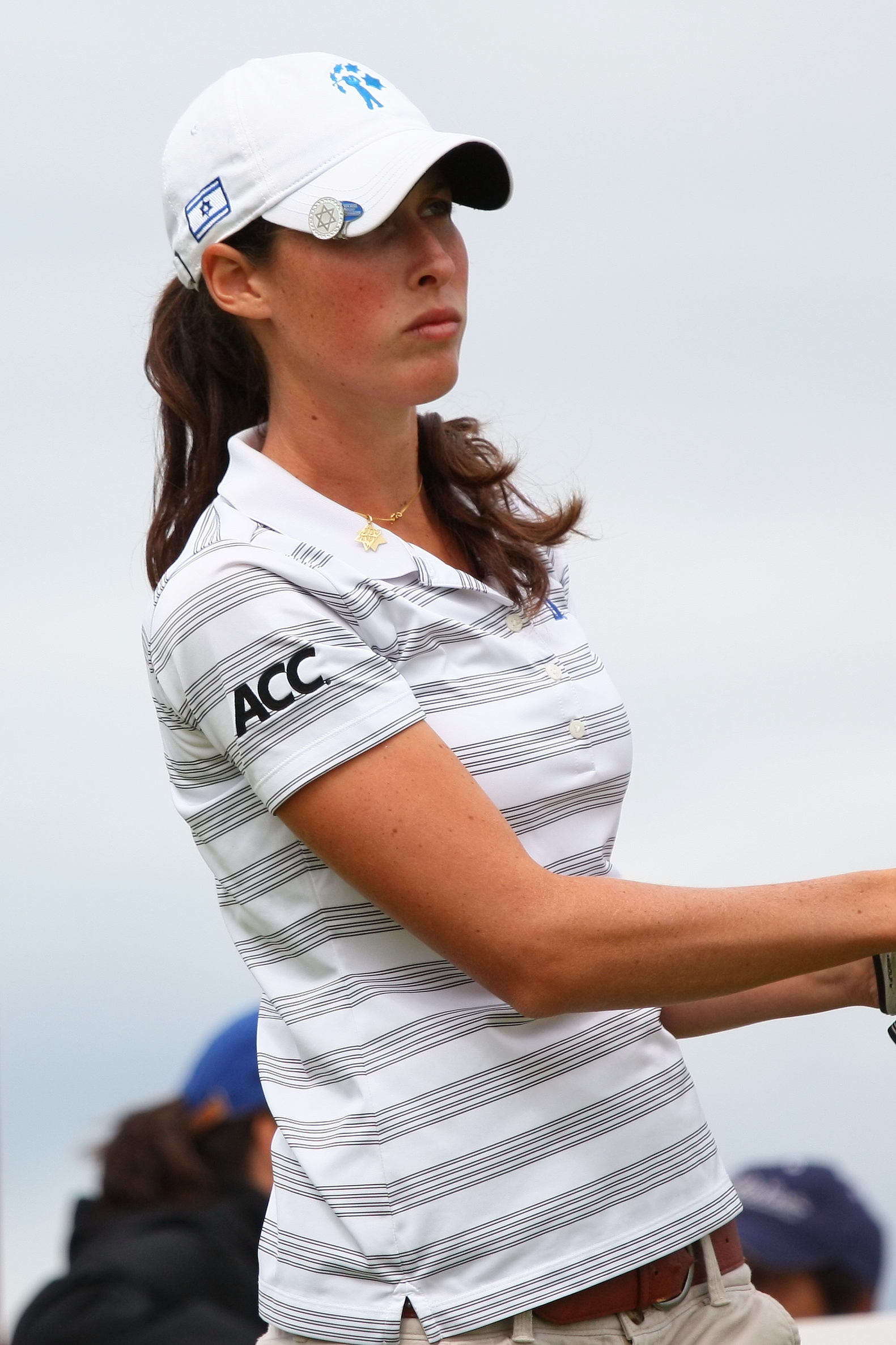
Laetitia Beck

- Keren Ann (born 1974), pop singer-songwriter
- Laetitia Beck (born 1992), Belgian-born Israeli LPGA and Olympic golfer
- Yoav Cohen (born 1999), Israeli Olympic windsurfer
- Noga Erez (born 1989), singer
- Amit Farkash (born 1989), Canadian-born Israeli actress and singer
- Arcadi Gaydamak (born 1952), Russian-Israeli businessman
- Benjamin Netanyahu (born 1949), politician and ninth Prime Minister of Israel
- Avraham Yosef Schapira (1921-2000), businessman and politician
- Dan Shilon (born 1940), television host, director, and producer
- Ezer Weizman (1924–2005), politician and seventh President of Israel
- Stef Wertheimer (born 1926), industrialist and politician

== Bibliography ==
- Morris, Benny (2004). The Birth of the Palestinian Refugee Problem Revisited. Cambridge Middle East Studies. Cambridge University Press. p. 130. ISBN 978-0-521-00967-6.
- Seferović, Nina (1981). "Колонија херцеговачких муслимана у Кајзерији у Палестини" [Colony of Herzegovinian Muslims in Kayseria in Palestine]. In Vlahović, Petar (ed.). Зборник радова Етнографског института [Proceedings of the Ethnographic Institute] (in Serbian). Vol. 12. Belgrade: Ethnographic Institute of the Serbian Academy of Sciences and Arts.
