= Binyamina railway station =

Railway station in Israel

Binyamina בנימינה
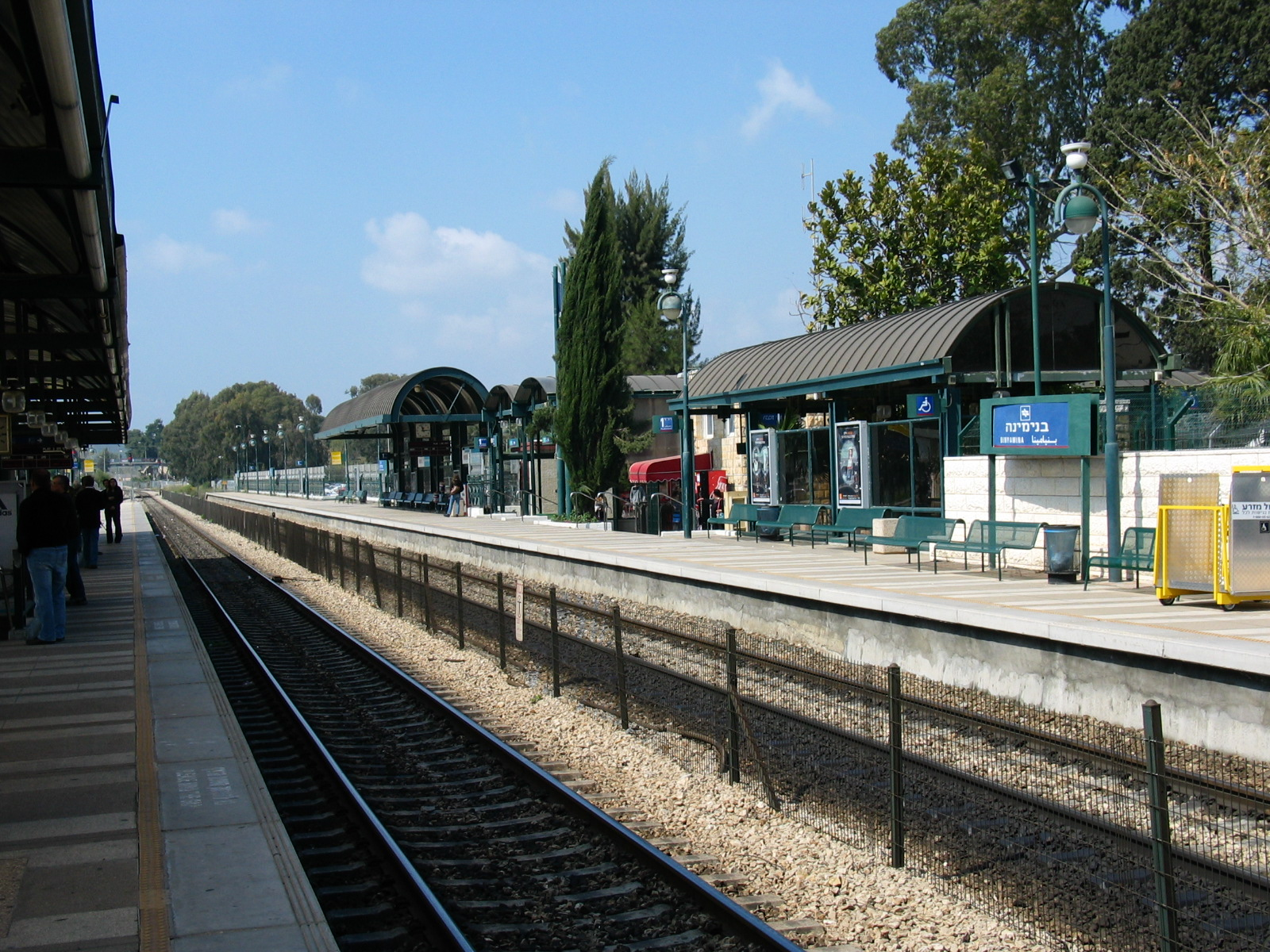

General information
- Location: HaMesilla St., Binyamina-Giv'at Ada
- Coordinates: 32°30′50″N 34°56′59″E

Construction
- Parking: 500 spaces
- Cycle facilities: 10 spaces

History
- Opened: 11 July 1921; 105 years ago
- Electrified: 11 February 2023; 3 years ago

Passengers
- 2019: 3,336,093
- Rank: 11 out of 68
Location

Binyamina railway station (Hebrew: תחנת הרכבת בנימינה, Taḥanat HaRakevet Binyamina) is an Israel Railways passenger station located in the region of Binyamina-Giv'at Ada and serves these towns, as well as Zikhron Ya'akov, Or Akiva and other small communities in the area.

== Location ==
The station is situated on the north–south coastal line and is located in the southern part of Binyamina. It is located on HaMesila street (Hebrew: רחוב המסילה, The Track street), besides the Zikhron Ya'akov – Pardes Hanna-Karkur road (Route 652).

== History ==
The station was opened on July 11, 1921, as a halt on the Coastal railway line, constructed by the British during their Mandate of Palestine.

After the establishment of the State of Israel it became one of the combined passenger-freight stations on the Tel Aviv – Haifa railway line. The relatively low population density and the lack of places of interest in the area meant that the station's importance was minimal.

During the late 1990s the station underwent considerable change, both in design and its role in the Israel Railways network. The station underwent large-scale reconstruction that included the construction of an additional island platform, a tunnel under the tracks connecting the platforms and two adjacent bridges above them, as well as expansion of the station building while preserving the original stone structure. At the same time Israel Railways implemented a plan which made Binyamina Railway Station the northernmost station on the Tel Aviv suburban line (Binyamina/Netanya - Tel Aviv - Rehovot/Ashkelon Suburban Service) and the last station before Tel Aviv for Inter-City trains traveling on the Haifa–Tel Aviv route, making Binyamina railway station one of the most important interchange station in the entire Israel Railways network.

On July 16, 2001, the Binyamina railway station was the scene of a suicide bombing. The terror attack was executed by a Palestinian who was sent by Palestinian Islamic Jihad and detonated himself on the crowded platform, killing 2 IDF soldiers, a man and a woman, and severely injuring one more soldier and at least 8 civilians.

During the 2006 Israel-Lebanon conflict the station briefly acted as Israel's northernmost station after Israel Railways announced the suspension of all train service north of Binyamina as a result of a Hezbollah Katyusha rocket hitting a train depot in Haifa on July 16, 2006, killing 8 Israel Railways workers. Train service to both Atlit railway station and Hof HaCarmel railway station was reinstated several days later, after Israel Railways gave in to heavy public pressure, annulling its new and unfortunate status.

With the entry into force of a new timetable on 26 December 2021, Binyamina will lose its status as the only northern transfer station between intercity trains and the central-Israel region suburban trains, as a few of the trains on the route will stop at Herzliya during peak hours.

== Design ==
The station consists of a side platform and an island platform, serving tracks numbered 1 to 3 from east to west. Between the side platform and the island platform there are two parallel rail tracks, and an additional track to the west of platform 3, there are several additional tracks to the west of the station in use by freight trains.

The station hall is located to the east of the rail tracks. The two platforms are interconnected by a pedestrian tunnel. A pedestrian bridge is also connecting the platforms and a second adjacent bridge connects the parking lot just to the east of the station to the industrial zone to the west, bypassing any station territory where train tickets are required.

Platform 1 is used by southbound Inter-City trains, platform 2 for northbound Inter-City trains. Platform 3 is used by the Tel Aviv suburban trains as a terminus of their journey.

The Inter-City train from Haifa always arrives several minutes before the suburban train to Tel Aviv departs, allowing interchange for passengers wishing to do so. The Passengers disembark the Inter-City train at platform 1 and go through the pedestrian tunnel to platform 3, where the suburban train is waiting. A similar but reverse interchange is possible between an incoming suburban train and an Inter-City train from Tel Aviv.

== Planned relocation ==
As part of National Infrastructure Plan 65-Aleph, the number of tracks on the Coastal Railway will be increased from two to six. The route of the railway near Binyamina will be moved adjacent to Highway 4 and Binyamina Station will be relocated next to Binyamina Junction on Highway 4.

One pair of the planned six tracks on the Coastal Railway will exclusively serve an express train which will travel between Haifa and Tel Aviv at speeds of up to 250 km/h. This train is only expected to make a single stop along the route – at Hadera West (two stations south of Binyamina), where a large combined public transport complex will be built. When this plan is implemented in the 2030s, Hadera West will take over from Binaymina as the key transfer station between intercity and suburban trains along the central section of the Coastal Railway.

== Train service ==
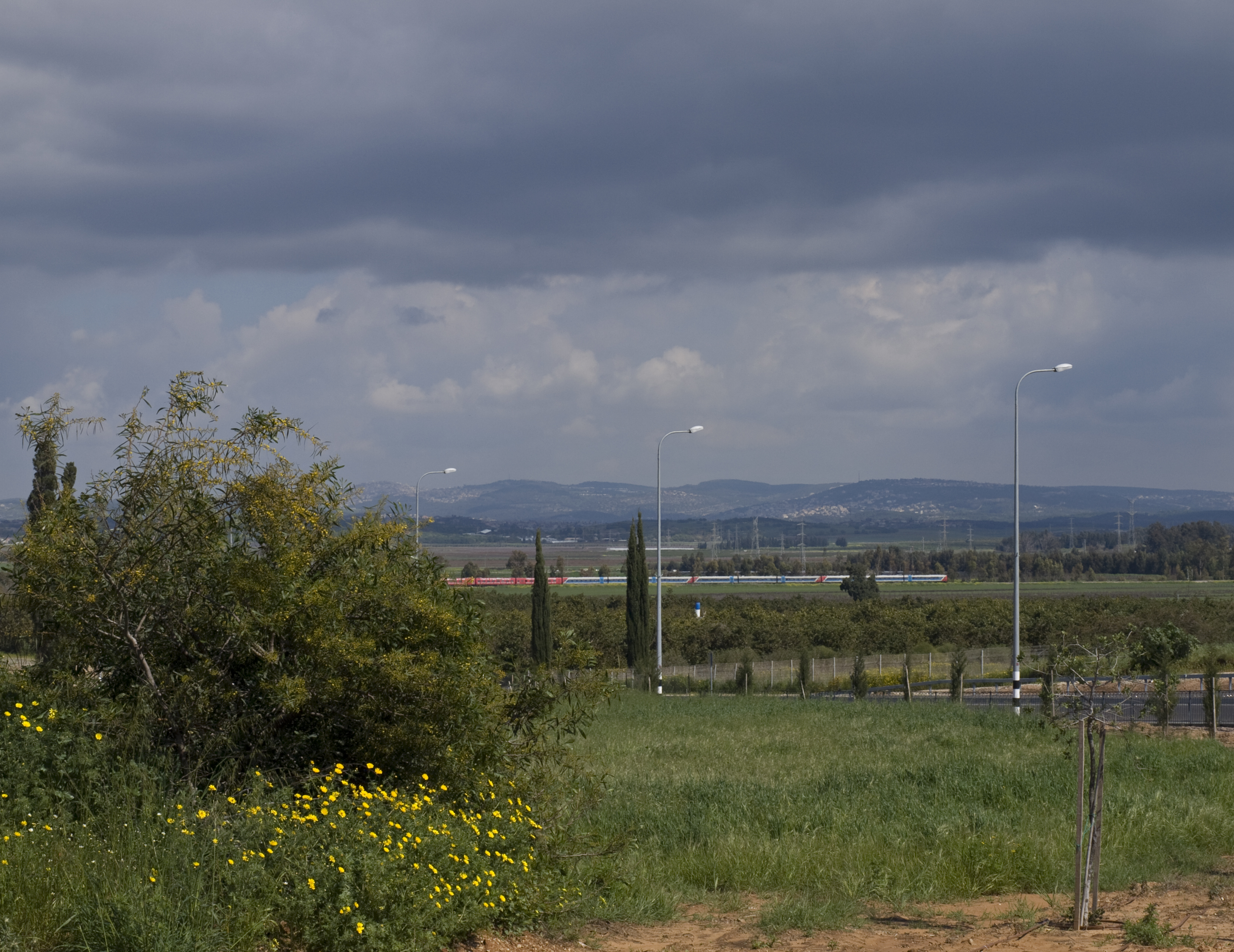
A passenger train approaches Binyamina station from the south

Binyamina railway station is a station on both the main north–south Coastal line of Israel Railways (Nahariya–Haifa–Tel Aviv–Ben-Gurion Airport inter-city service) and a terminus for the Tel Aviv suburban line (Binyamina/Netanya–Tel Aviv–Rehovot/Ashkelon suburban service), as well as being an important interchange station between the two railway lines. The station is situated between Atlit railway station to the north and Caesarea-Pardes Hanna railway station to the south.

- Inter-city service:
  - On weekdays the station is served by 35 southbound and 35 northbound trains. First train departs at 01:56 and last train arrives at 00:27.
  - On Fridays and holiday eves the station is served by 23 southbound and 20 northbound trains. First train departs at 01:56 and last train arrives at 15:06.
  - On Saturdays and holiday the station is served by 6 southbound and 5 northbound trains. First train departs at 19:17 and last train arrives at 21:50.
- Suburban service:
  - On weekdays the station is served by 27 southbound and 26 northbound suburban trains. First train departs at 06:17 and last train arrives at 21:51.
  - On Fridays and holiday eves the station is served by 5 southbound and 6 northbound suburban trains. First train departs at 10:49 and last train arrives at 15:02.

| Preceding station | Israel Railways | Following station |
|---|---|---|
| Atlit towards Nahariya | Nahariya–Modi'in | Tel Aviv–University towards Modi'in–Center |
| Terminus | Binyamina–Beersheba | Caesarea–Pardes Hanna towards Be'er Sheva–Center |
| Haifa–Hof HaCarmel towards Nahariya | Night Train Nahariya–Ben Gurion Airport | Hadera–West towards Ben Gurion Airport |

== Station layout ==
Platform numbers increase in an East-to-West direction

Side platform
| Platform 1 | Nahariya–Modi'in trains toward Modi'in–Center (Tel Aviv–University) → Nahariya–Beersheba and Karmiel–Beersheba trains toward Be'er Sheva–Center do not stop here → |
| Platform 2 | ← Nahariya–Modi'in trains toward Nahariya (Haifa–Hof HaCarmel or Atlit, alternating every half hour) ← Nahariya–Beersheba trains toward Nahariya do not stop here ← Karmiel–Beersheba trains toward Karmiel do not stop here |
Island platform
| Platform 3 | Binyamina–Beersheba trains toward Be'er Sheva–Center (Caesarea–Pardes Hanna) → Night Train toward Ben Gurion Airport (Hadera–West) → |

== Ridership ==
Passengers boarding and disembarking by year
| Year | Passengers | Rank | Source |
|---|---|---|---|
| 2021 | 1,954,827 (▲748,533) | 8 of 66 (▲4) | 2021 Freedom of Information Law Annual Report |
| 2020 | 1,206,294 (▼2,129,799) | 12 of 68 (▼1) | 2020 Freedom of Information Law Annual Report |
| 2019 | 3,336,093 | 11 of 68 | 2019 Freedom of Information Law Annual Report |

== Public transport connections ==
Binyamina railway station is located besides the Zikhron Ya'akov – Pardes Hanna-Karkur road (Route 652) and is accessible by several bus lines as well as sherut taxis, bus line 9, 10 are synchronized with train arrival or departure times. The bus lines are:

- 1: Benyamina, intracity, operated by Kavim.
- 9: Or Aqiva – Benyamina, direct, operated by Kavim.
- 10: Or Aqiva – Benyamina, via Caesarea-Pardes Hanna railway station, operated by Kavim.
- 11: Benyamina - Or Aqiva, via Caesarea-Pardes Hanna railway station, operated by Kavim.
- 70: Zikhron Ya'akov – Hadera, operated by Kavim.
- 156: Afula – Binyamina railway station, operated by Superbus.
- 157: Yokneam – Binyamina railway station, operated by Superbus.
- 202: Haifa Hof HaCarmel Central Bus Station – Pardes Hanna-Karkur, operated by Egged.
- 222: Haifa Hof HaCarmel Central Bus Station – Hadera, operated by Egged.
- 708, 710: Netanya - Zikhron Ya'akov, operated by Kavim.
- 872: Zikhron Ya'akov – Tel Aviv Central Bus Station, operated by Egged.

Sherut Taxis (share taxis) stop on the road outside the station.

== Facilities ==
- Payphone
- Ticket cashier
- Ticket machine
- Buffet
- Parking lot
- Toilet
- Taxi station
