= Servan-Schreiber =

Servan-Schreiber is a surname. Notable people with the surname include:

- Brigitte Gros, born Brigitte Servan-Schreiber (1925–1985), French journalist and politician
- Christiane Collange, born Christiane Servan-Schreiber (1930–2023), French journalist
- David Servan-Schreiber (1961–2011), French physician
- Émile Servan-Schreiber (1888–1967), French journalist
- Fabienne Servan-Schreiber, French film and television producer
- Jean-Claude Servan-Schreiber (1918–2018), French journalist and politician
- Jean-Jacques Servan-Schreiber (1924–2006), French journalist and politician
- Jean-Louis Servan-Schreiber, French journalist

== See also ==
- Servan (disambiguation)
- Schreiber (surname)
