= List of senators of Gard =

Location of Gard in France

Following is a list of senators of Gard, people who have represented the department of Gard in the Senate of France.

== Third Republic ==
Senators for Gard under the French Third Republic were:

- Jacques Bonnefoy-Sibour (1876)
- Louis Laget (1876–1882)
- Pierre Meinadier (1876–1894)
- Ferdinand Gazagne (1879–1885)
- Louis-Edmond Claris (1885–1894)
- Auguste Dide (1885–1894)
- Alfred Silhol (1894–1903)
- Frédéric Desmons (1894–1910)
- Georges Bonnefoy-Sibour (1894–1918)
- Fernand Crémieux (1903–1928)
- Gaston Doumergue (1910–1924)
- Jean Cazelles (1920–1924)
- Louis Méjean (1924–1931)
- Georges Bruguier (1924–1945)
- Jean Bosc (1929–1939)
- Gaston Bazile (1931–1945)
- Louis Mourier (1939–1945)

== Fourth Republic ==
Senators for Gard under the French Fourth Republic were:

- Fernand Jarrié (1946–1948)
- Léon Vergnole (1946–1948)
- Suzanne Crémieux (1948–1955)
- Edgar Tailhades (1948–1959)
- Paul Béchard (1955–1958)

== Fifth Republic ==
Senators for Gard under the French Fifth Republic:

In office	Name	Group or party	Notes
1959–1976	Suzanne Crémieux	Gauche Démocratique	Died in office 11 July 1976
1959–1986	Edgar Tailhades	Socialiste	Died in office 23 June 1986
1976–1980	Maurice Fontaine	Gauche Démocratique	From 12 July 1976 in place of Suzanne Crémieux
1980–1992	Gilbert Baumet	Rassemblement Démocratique et Européen	Resigned 14 October 1992
1980–2008	André Rouvière	Socialiste	
1986–1988	Georges Benedetti	Socialiste	From 24 June 1986 in place of Edgar Tailhades; Until 24 June 1988 (elected deputy)
1988–1997	Claude Pradille	Socialiste	Removed from office 11 September 1997
1992–1998	Francis Cavalier-Bénézet	Socialiste	From 20 December 1992 in place of Gilbert Baumet
1998–2008	Alain Journet	Socialiste	
1998–present	Simon Sutour	Socialiste et républicain	
2008–2014	Françoise Laurent-Perrigot	Socialiste et apparentés	
2008–2017	Jean-Paul Fournier	Les Républicains	Resigned 24 September 2017
2014–present	Vivette Lopez	Les Républicains	
2017	Max Roustan		From 25 September 2017 in place of Jean-Paul Fournier; Resigned 30 September 2017
2017–present	Pascale Bories	Les Républicains	From 1 October 2017 in place of Max Roustan

== Sources ==
- Liste des anciens sénateurs de la IIIème République par circonscription (in French), Sénat de France
- Liste des anciens sénateurs de la IVème République par circonscription (in French), Sénat de France
- Liste des anciens sénateurs de la Vème République par circonscription (in French), Sénat de France
- Liste par département - Gard (in French), Sénat de France
