= Ferniot =

Ferniot is a surname. Notable people with the surname include:

- Jean Ferniot (1918–2012), French journalist and novelist
- Vincent Ferniot (born 1960), French actor, food writer, and television presenter
