= Vincent Ferniot =

French actor, television presenter and culinary writer (born 1960)

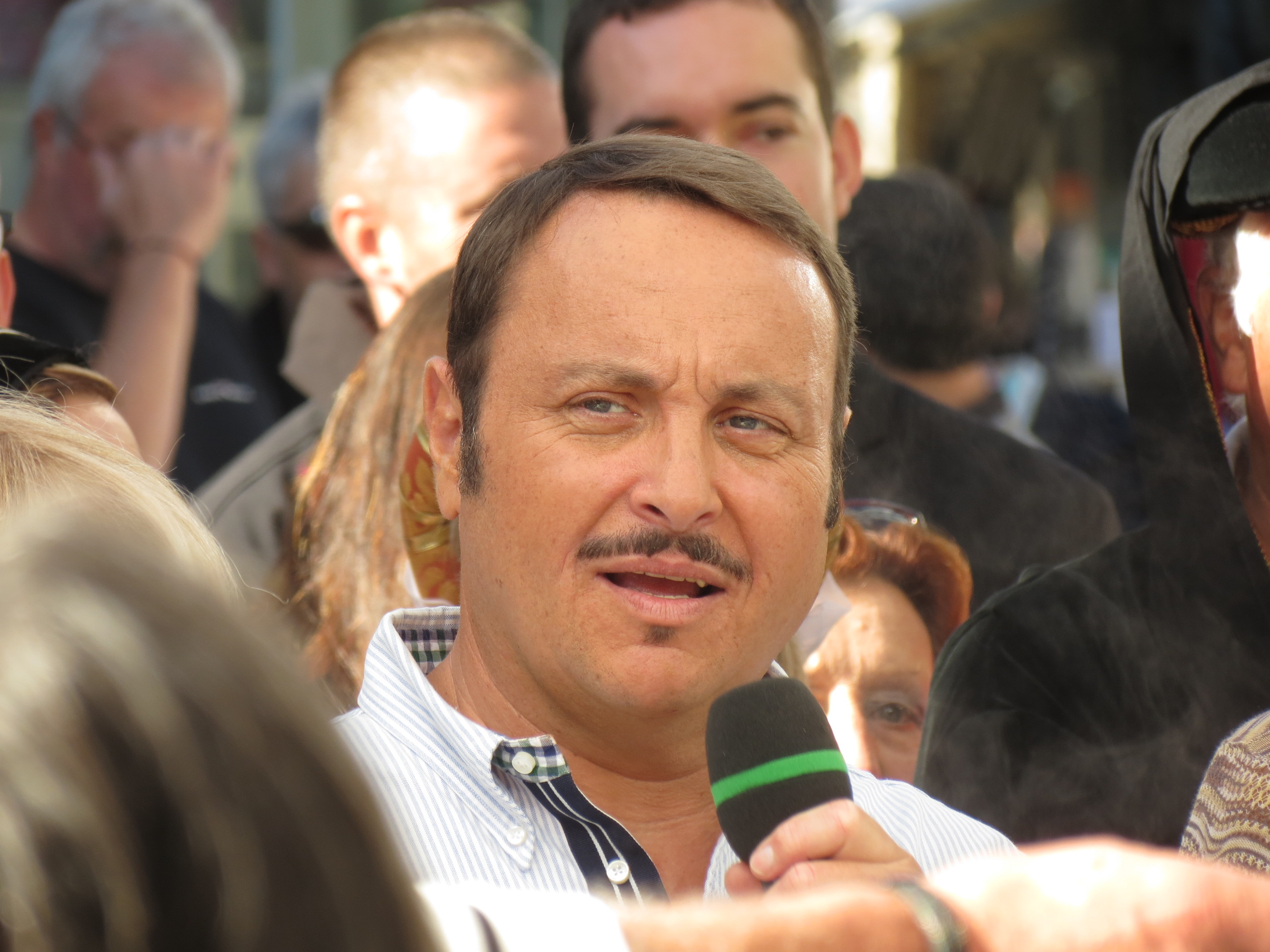
- Vincent Ferniot in 2013
- Born: June 14, 1960 (age 65); Neuilly-sur-Seine, France
- Education: École nationale supérieure des arts décoratifs
- Occupation: Journalist
- Parent(s): Jean Ferniot; Christiane Collange
- Relatives: Émile Servan-Schreiber (maternal grandfather)Jean-Jacques Servan-Schreiber (maternal uncle); Jean-Louis Servan-Schreiber (maternal uncle); Brigitte Gros (maternal aunt)

Vincent Ferniot (born July 14, 1960) is a French actor, television presenter and culinary writer.

== Early life ==
Vincent Ferniot was born on July 14, 1960, in Neuilly-sur-Seine, France. His parents, Jean Ferniot and Christiane Collange, are journalists and authors. He is of Jewish-Prussian descent on his maternal side.

Ferniot graduated from the École nationale supérieure des arts décoratifs.

== Career ==
Ferniot started his career as a singer and guitar player for Les Civils, a rock'n'roll band. He subsequently became an actor, starring in Le bunker de la dernière rafale and Adieu Blaireau 1985, followed by Agent Trouble in 1987.

Ferniot was a radio contributor on France Inter, Europe 1 and RTL. He went on to become a presenter on France 2 and Canal+. Since 2015, he has presented Midi en France, a culinary programme on France 3.

Ferniot is the author of several books about food. He is the vice president of the Association Amicale des Amateurs d'Andouillette Authentique. He was described by Le Figaro as a "bon vivant".

== Works ==
- Ferniot, Vincent (1996). Trésors du terroir. Paris: Stock. ISBN 9782234044074. OCLC 36084369.
- Ferniot, Vincent (1999). Plus jamais gros! : la méthode d'un gourmand qui a su maigrir avec plaisir. Paris: Orban. ISBN 9782855658575. OCLC 421804313.
- Ferniot, Vincent (2002). Mon carnet de recettes. Paris: Flammarion. ISBN 9782082008112. OCLC 470063447.
- Ferniot, Vincent (2005). Le guide Ferniot Hachette des bons produits. Paris: Hachette. ISBN 9782012368682. OCLC 470415446.
- Ferniot, Simon; Ferniot, Vincent (2013). Recettes de chefs en boco : simple et beau. Paris: Hachette Cuisine. ISBN 9782012315082. OCLC 936675106.
- Ferniot, Vincent; Lagorce, Sylvie (2015). La cuisine de nos régions : un tour de France gourmand en 200 recettes. Paris: Solar éditions. ISBN 9782263062445. OCLC 930935034.
- Ferniot, Vincent (2015). 20 recettes créatives et savoureuses : Boursin cuisine. Paris: Hotcakes. ISBN 9791094981023. OCLC 922809508.
