= Fabienne Servan-Schreiber =

French film and television producer (born 1950)

- Born: 23 March 1950 (age 76); Neuilly-sur-Seine, France
- Education: Lycée Victor-Duruy
- Alma mater: Paris-Sorbonne University
- Occupation: Producer
- Spouse: Henri Weber
- Children: 3
- Parent(s): Jean-Claude Servan-Schreiber; Christiane Laroche
- Relatives: Émile Servan-Schreiber (paternal great-uncle); Jean-Jacques Servan-Schreiber (paternal uncle); Jean-Louis Servan-Schreiber (paternal uncle); Brigitte Gros (paternal aunt); Christiane Collange (paternal aunt); Édouard Stern (half-brother)

Fabienne Servan-Schreiber (born 23 March 1950) is a French film and television producer. She is the founder and president of Cinétévé, a production company.

== Early life ==
Fabienne Servan-Schreiber is the daughter of Jean-Claude Servan-Schreiber, a politician, and Christiane Laroche. Her paternal uncles were Jean-Jacques Servan-Schreiber and Jean-Louis Servan-Schreiber, while her aunts are Brigitte Gros and Christiane Collange. She is of Jewish-Prussian descent on her paternal side. Her parents divorced when she was three years old, and her mother later remarried into the Stern family. She grew up in Paris.

Servan-Schreiber was educated at the Lycée Victor Duruy earning her Baccalauréat. She graduated from the University of Paris, where she earned a bachelor's degree in history.

== Career ==
Servan-Schreiber started her career as an assistant to director Henri de Turenne on C’était hier. She then served as an assistant and later a director of several documentaries, and she worked for directors Frédéric Rossif, Vincent Malle and Claude Berri. She subsequently produced Les Murs de Santiago, directed by Carmen Castillo.

Servan-Schreiber started her own production company, Cinétévé, in 1982. She serves as its president. She has produced films, documentaries, and television series like Witnesses. Some of the films she produced are Lumière et compagnie La Fille de Keltoum, Calle 54, Jean de La Fontaine, Le défi, and Les Ponts de Sarajevo. She directed a deradicalisation campaign for the French Ministry of the Interior in partnership with the Organization for Security and Co-operation in Europe (OSCE) in 2016.

Servan-Schreiber won a 7 d'Or for Jalna in 1994, a Fipa d’Or and another 7 d'or for Fatou, la Malienne in 2001, and a Fipa d’Argent for Mais qui a tué Maggie in 2009. She won the Best Fiction Producer of the Year Award from Procirep in 2016.

Servan-Schreiber serves as the vice president of the Union Syndicale de la Production Audiovisuelle. She is a Knight of the Ordre des Arts et des Lettres, the Legion of Honour and the National Order of Merit.

== Political activism ==
In May 2012, Servan-Schreiber co-authored a petition alongside Jean-Pierre Mignard and Bertrand Monthubert expressing their concern about the rise of the far right in France. By April 2012, she co-authored an op-ed encouraging French people to vote for François Hollande as President.

== Personal life ==
Servan-Schreiber married Henri Weber, a Socialist politician, in 2007.
