= Véronique Le Bris =

Véronique Le Bris is a journalist and film critic, a former editor-in-chief of Première, and the founder of the website cine-woman. She has also contributed to Le Nouvel Obs and Zurban. She is an advocate for gender parity and the recognition of women's talent in the film industry.

== History ==
In 1991, she obtained a DEA (Master of Advanced Studies) in public relations from CELSA and graduated from Sciences Po Bordeaux in 1988.

From 2006 to 2012, she served as deputy editor-in-chief of the film magazine Première.

In 2013, she founded the website cine-woman.fr, a women's film web magazine.

In 2018, she created the Alice Guy Prize, which rewards the best French feature film of the year directed by a woman. This award, a tribute to Alice Guy, also recognizes female short-film directors. Since its 2020 edition, FIDMarseille has also presented an Alice Guy Prize.

In 2021, she published 100 grands films de réalisatrices (100 Great Films by Female Directors). That same year, the book was the subject of an exhibition at the Hôtel de Ville de Paris (Paris City Hall) as part of a partnership between ARTE and the City of Paris.

She contributes to the editorial team of Les Echos Week-end.

In 2025, she published Alice Guy, la plus audacieuse des pionniers du cinéma (Alice Guy: The Boldest of Film Pioneers), a biography of Alice Guy, which was awarded the Simone Veil Prize by the 8th arrondissement City Hall.

== Bibliography ==
- Fashion & Cinéma, Paris, Cahiers du cinéma, 2014;
- 50 femmes de cinéma (50 Women of Cinema), 2018, Editions Marest
- 100 grands films de réalisatrices (100 Great Films by Female Directors), 2021, Editions Gründ et Arte;
- 100 grands films bons pour la planète (100 Great Films Good for the Planet), 2022, Gründ / ARTE Editions;
- Alice Guy, la plus audacieuse des pionniers du cinéma (Alice Guy: The Boldest of Film Pioneers), 2025, Editions Hors Collection.
