= Vivette =

Vivette is a given name.

People with this name include:

- Vivette Girault (born 1943), French mathematician
- Vivette Glover (born 1942), British psychobiologist
- Vivette J. Kady, Canadian writer, finalist for Journey Prize and Danuta Gleed Literary Award
- Vivette Lewis, co-founder of Jamaican theatre group Sistren Theatre Collective
- Vivette Lopez, Senator of Gard

Fictional characters and works with this name include:

- Vivette, in L'Arlésienne (short story) and in the associated play, opera, film, and ballet
- Vivette, in Buridan's Donkey (film)
- Vivette, in Letters from My Windmill (film)
- La Belle Vivette, rewritten libretto to the opera La belle Hélène
- Vivette, novelette by Gelett Burgess

== See also ==
- Poncelet Vivette, airplane entered in the Lympne light aircraft trials
- Vivette, ship in List of shipwrecks in 1899
