= Plouvien =

- Commune
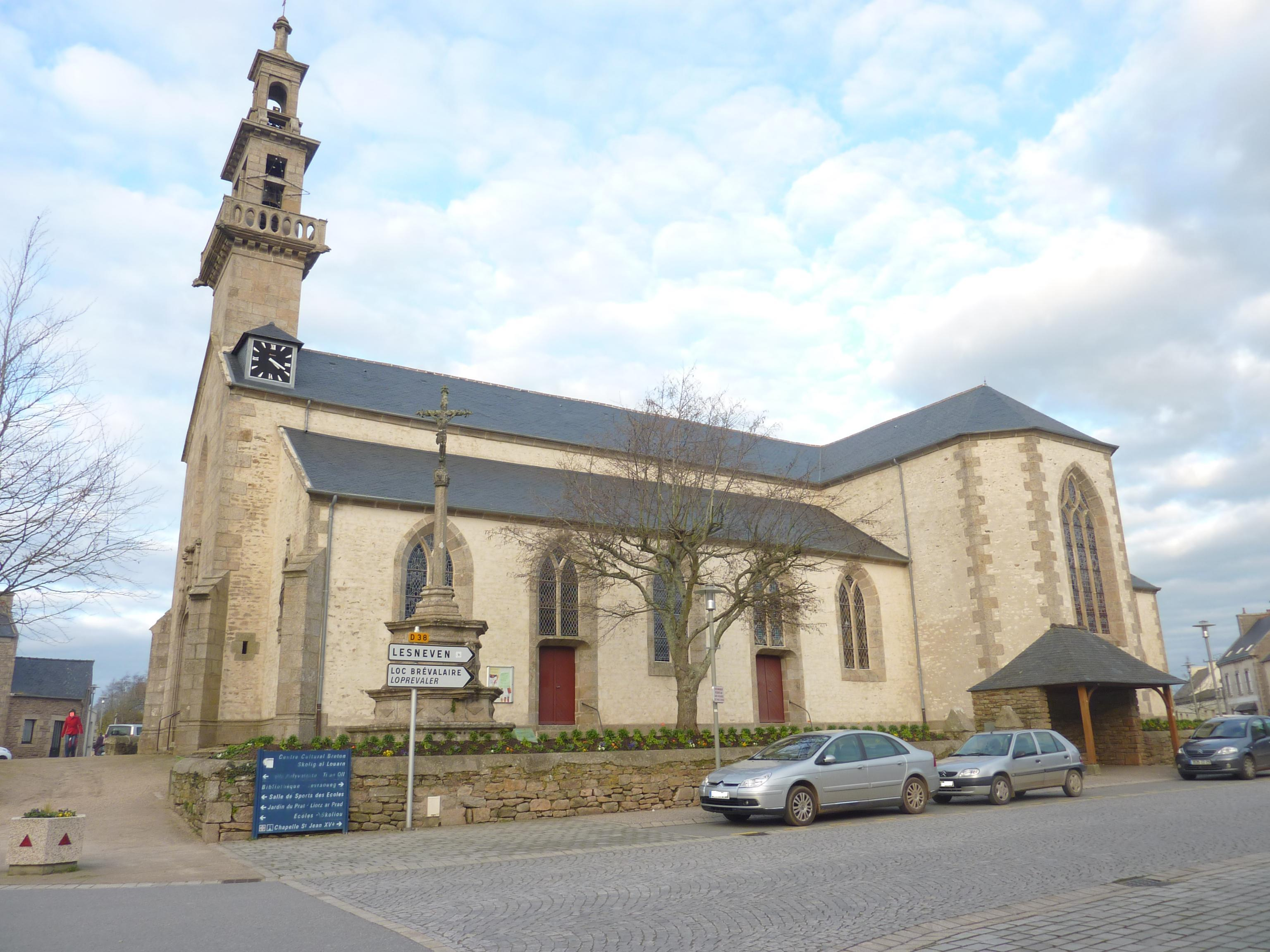
- The parish church of Saint-Pierre and Saint-Paul

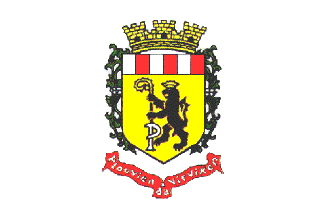
- Flag Coat of arms
- Location of Plouvien
- Location within France Location within Brittany
- Coordinates: 48°31′49″N 4°27′06″W
- Country: France
- Region: Brittany
- Department: Finistère
- Arrondissement: Brest
- Canton: Plabennec
- Intercommunality: Pays des Abers

Government
  - Mayor (2020–2026): Hervé Oldani
- Area^{1}: 33.70 km^{2} (13.01 sq mi)
- Highest elevation: 89 m (292 ft)
- Lowest elevation: 0 m (0 ft)
- Population (2023): 3,968
  - Density: 117.7/km^{2} (305.0/sq mi)
- Time zone: UTC+01:00 (CET)
  - Summer (DST): UTC+02:00 (CEST)
- INSEE/Postal code: 29209 /29860
- ^{1} French Land Register data, which excludes lakes, ponds, glaciers > 1 km^{2} (0.386 sq mi or 247 acres) and river estuaries.

Plouvien (French pronunciation: [pluvjɛ̃]; Breton: Plouvien) is a commune in the Finistère department of Brittany in north-western France. The journalist and writer Jean Bothorel was born in Plouvien on 12 May 1940.

== Population ==
Inhabitants of Plouvien are called in French Plouviennois.

Historical population
Year	Pop.	±% p.a.
1968	2,291	—
1975	2,431	+0.85%
1982	2,779	+1.93%
1990	2,886	+0.47%
1999	3,187	+1.11%
2007	3,601	+1.54%
2012	3,708	+0.59%
2017	3,766	+0.31%
2023	3,968	+0.87%
Source: INSEE

== Breton language ==
The municipality launched a linguistic plan concerning the Breton language through Ya d'ar brezhoneg on 24 May 2007.

In 2008, 7.54% of primary-school children attended bilingual schools.

== See also ==
- Communes of the Finistère department
- List of the works of Bastien and Henry Prigent
