= L'Expansion =

French economic magazine

- Categories: Business magazine
- Frequency: Monthly
- Founder: Jean-Louis Servan-Schreiber and Jean Boissonnat
- Founded: 1967; 59 years ago
- Final issue: 2017
- Company: Altice
- Country: France
- Based in: language = French, France
- Website: L'Expansion
- ISSN: 0014-4703
- OCLC: 5514833

L'Expansion was a French former monthly business magazine based in Paris, France, which existed between 1967 and 2017.

== History and profile ==
L'Expansion was founded by Jean-Louis Servan-Schreiber and Jean Boissonnat in 1967. In 1994 the magazine was relaunched and was published on a fortnightly basis in the 1990s.

It is part of Altice's media division, which also owns the magazines, L'Express, and Lire among others. The headquarters of L'Expansion is in Paris. The magazine is published on a monthly basis and provides articles on economic and financial news.

== Circulation ==
L'Expansion sold 163,355 copies during the period of 2003–2004. The 2006 paid circulation was 160,514. During the 2007–2008 period the magazine had a circulation of 161,000 copies. Its circulation was 150,076 copies in 2010.
