= The World Challenge (TV series) =

Canadian television documentary series

The World Challenge (French: Le défi mondial) is a Canadian television documentary series that aired in English on CBC Television and in French on Télévision de Radio-Canada in 1986. Adapted from Jean-Jacques Servan-Schreiber's 1980 book Le Défi mondial, the six-episode series was hosted by Peter Ustinov and Patrick Watson, and centred on the political and social challenges that threaten the future of humanity.

The French edition of the series premiered in January 1986, with the English version launching in June.
