= Jean Boissonnat =

French economic journalist (1929–2016)

- Born: 16 January 1929; Paris, France
- Died: 25 September 2016 (aged 87); Paris, France
- Education: Sciences Po
- Occupation: Journalist

Jean Boissonnat (French: [ʒɑ̃ bwasɔna]; 16 January 1929 – 25 September 2016) was a French economic journalist. He was the co-founder and editor-in-chief of L'Expansion. He was the author of several books.

== Early life ==
Jean Boissonnat was born on 16 January 1929 in Paris, France. He graduated from Sciences Po. While he was a student, he joined Jeunesse Étudiante Chrétienne.

== Career ==
Boissonnat was a faculty member at his alma mater, Sciences Po, from 1960 to 1971.

Boissonnat was an economic journalist for La Croix from 1954 to 1967. In 1967, he co-founded L'Expansion with Jean-Louis Servan-Schreiber. He served as its editor-in-chief from 1967 to 1986, and as its senior editor from 1986 to 1994. He also served as the editor-in-chief of La Tribune from 1987 to 1992. He later founded L'Entreprise.

Boissonnat was also a commentator on Europe 1. Additionally, he wrote articles for Le Parisien, Le Midi libre, Le Progrès, L’Est républicain and Ouest-France. He served on the board of directors of Bayard Presse.

Boissonnat was the author of several books.

== Death ==
Boissonnat died of a stroke on 25 September 2016 in Paris, France. He was 87 years old.

== Works ==
- Boissonnat, Jean (1966). La Politique des revenus. Paris: Éditions du Seuil. OCLC 299485010.
- Boissonnat, Jean (1984). Journal de crise, 1973-1984. Paris: JC Lattès. OCLC 12775291.
- Albert, Michel; Boissonnat, Jean (1988). Crise Krach Boom. Paris: Éditions du Seuil. ISBN 9782020100878. OCLC 300927812.
- Boissonnat, Jean (1995). Rendez-vous avec l'Histoire. Paris: Calmann-Lévy. ISBN 9782702124031. OCLC 34374209.
- Boissonnat, Jean (1995). Le Travail dans vingt ans. Paris: Editions Odile Jacob. ISBN 9782738103505. OCLC 214950520.
- Boissonnat, Jean (1998). La révolution de 1999 : l'Europe avec l'euro. Paris: Sand. ISBN 9782710706373. OCLC 40502602.
- Boissonnat, Jean; Grannec, Christophe (1999). L'aventure du christianisme social : passé et avenir. Paris: Bayard. ISBN 9782227317192. OCLC 954613091.
- Boissonnat, Jean (2001). Europe, année zéro. Paris: Bayard. ISBN 9782227139466. OCLC 421997779.
- Boissonnat, Jean (2001). La Fin du chômage ?. Paris: Calmann-Lévy. ISBN 9782702131466. OCLC 46378074.
- Albert, Michel; Boissonnat, Jean; Camdessus, Michel (2001). Notre foi dans ce siècle. Paris: Arléa. ISBN 9782869595606. OCLC 300919818.
- Boissonnat, Jean (2004). Plaidoyer pour une France qui doute. Paris: Stock. ISBN 9782234056527. OCLC 469967961.
- Boissonnat, Jean (2005). Dieu et l'Europe. Paris: Desclée De Brouwer. ISBN 9782220055701. OCLC 420530379.
- Boissonnat, Jean (2009). 2029 ou comment j'ai traversé trois siècles en cent ans. Paris: Salvator. ISBN 9782706705977. OCLC 302387175.
