= Henri Weber =

French politician (1944–2020)

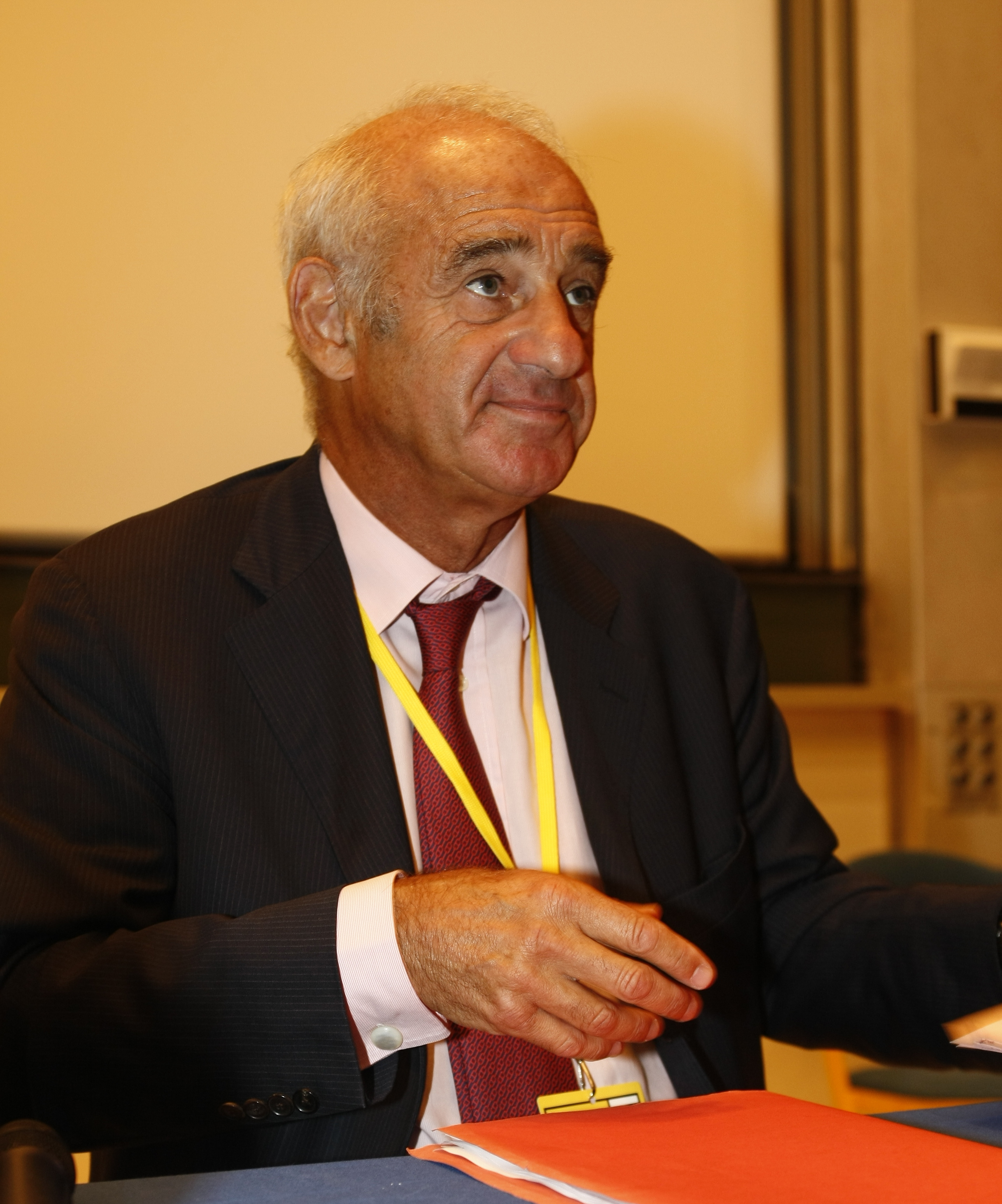
- Henri Weber in 2008

Member of the European Parliament
- In office 2004–2014

Member of the French Senate for Seine-Maritime
- In office 1995–2004

Personal details
- Born: 23 June 1944 Leninabad, Tajik SSR, Soviet Union
- Died: 26 April 2020 (aged 75) Avignon, France
- Party: Socialist Party
- Spouse: Fabienne Servan-Schreiber
- Children: 3
- Relatives: Jean-Claude Servan-Schreiber (father-in-law)
- Education: Faculté des lettres de Paris; Panthéon-Sorbonne University

Henri Weber (23 June 1944 – 26 April 2020) was a French politician and Member of the European Parliament for the north-west of France. He was a member of the Socialist Party (PS), which is part of the Party of European Socialists, and sat on the European Parliament's Committee on Culture and Education.

== Life and career ==
Weber was born in Leninabad (now Khujand), Tajikistan, Soviet Union, in a Soviet labor camp, on a hospital ship moored on the banks of the Syr-Daria river, to Polish Jewish parents who had fled from the town of Chrzanow, Galicia, during the Nazi 1939 invasion of Poland, and who later immigrated to France from Poland. His father was a watchmaker.

Henri Weber was an activist in the May 68 uprising and was a leading member of the Trotskyist Jeunesse communiste révolutionnaire (Revolutionary Communist Youth) and Revolutionary Communist League (LCR) before joining the PS.

He was also a substitute for the Committee on Economic and Monetary Affairs, a member of the delegation to the EU–Russia Parliamentary Cooperation Committee, and a substitute for the delegation for relations with Japan.

Weber died, aged 75, after contracting COVID-19 during the COVID-19 pandemic in France.

== Career ==
- Doctorate in philosophy
- Doctorate in politics
- Assistant lecturer (1968–1976), then senior lecturer (1976–1995) at the University of Paris 8
- National secretary of the Socialist Party, with responsibility for national education, then for training, culture and the media (1993–2003)
- Member of the Socialist Party's policy bureau, with responsibility for universities
- Deputy mayor of Saint-Denis (1988–1995)
- Member of Dieppe Municipal Council (1995–2001)
- Senator (1995–2004)
- Member of the European Parliament (1997)
- Treasurer of the Jean-Jaurès Foundation (1988–1997)
- Essayist

== Reviews ==
- Wilkinson, Paul (1982), Why Nicaragua?, which includes a review of Nicaragua: The Sandinist Revolution by Henri Weber, in Hearn, Sheila G. (ed.), Cencrastus No. 10, Autumn 1982, pp. 45 & 46, ISSN 0264-0856
