= Servan (disambiguation) =

Servan is a village in Iran.

Servan may also refer to

- Saint-Servan, a town in western France
- Arroyo de San Serván, a municipality in Spain
- Servan-Schreiber, a surname
- Joseph Michel Antoine Servan (1737–1807), French publicist and lawyer
- Joseph Marie Servan de Gerbey (1741–1808), French general
- Pierre-Servan-René Bouvet (1750–1795), French naval officer
