= Suzanne Crémieux =

French politician (1895–1976)

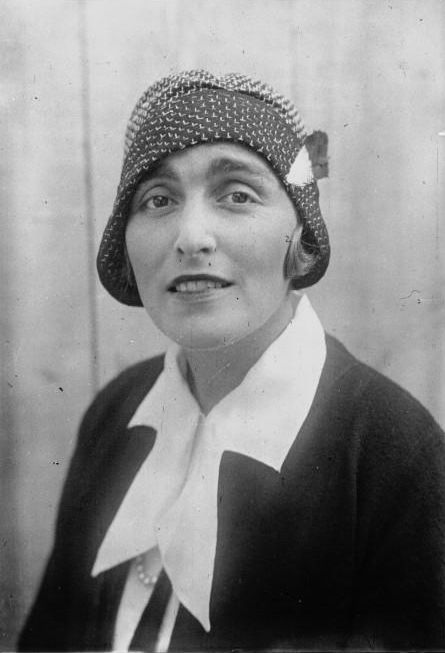
- Suzanne Crémieux in 1929

Member of the French Senate for Gard
- In office 1959–1976
- Preceded by: Paul Béchard
- Succeeded by: Maurice Fontaine

Personal details
- Born: 29 June 1895 Paris, France
- Died: 11 July 1976 (aged 81) Paris, France
- Spouse: Robert Servan-Schreiber
- Children: Jean-Claude Servan-Schreiber
- Parent: Fernand Crémieux

Suzanne Crémieux (29 June 1895 – 11 July 1976) was a French politician. She served as a member of the French Senate from 1948 to 1955, representing Gard, as a member of the democratic left group.
