= Jean Bothorel =

French journalist and author (born 1940)

- Born: 12 May 1940 (age 86); Plouvien
- Occupations: Journalist; Writer

Jean Bothorel (12 May 1940) is a French journalist and the author of many books. He is a former editor at Le Figaro. He was the 1993 winner of the Prix Goncourt de la Biographie.

== Career ==
Bothorel is a journalist. He first worked for L'Expansion, followed by La Vie and Le Matin de Paris. In 1986, he joined Le Figaro as an editor. He was fired a decade later because of the publication of Le Bal des vautours, in which he criticized senior editors Franz-Olivier Giesbert and Alain Peyrefitte.

Bothorel is the author of many books. He co-authored a book with President Pierre Mendès-France and authored three biographies of President Valéry Giscard d'Estaing. He also co-authored a book with French politician Raymond Barre and another one with Guinean President Alpha Condé. He authored biographies of French businessmen François Pinault and Vincent Bolloré. Additionally, he authored a novel, Le désir et la mort. He received the Prix Goncourt de la Biographie for his biography work Louise de Vilmorin in 1993.

Jean Bothorel has also been widely criticized in the media for a number of articles published in the Figaro which accused some political parties or personalities based on lies and total absence of facts. In a recent publications, the author praise the Bolloré family (a French billionaire) with the publication of "Vincent Bolloré, une histoire de famille", raising suspicion on his supporters' motives.

== Works ==
- Bothorel, Jean (1969). La Bretagne contre Paris. Paris: La Table ronde. OCLC 7521003.
- Bothorel, Jean; Mendès-France, Pierre (1974). Choisir. Paris: Stock. OCLC 319725437.
- Bothorel, Jean (1979). La République mondaine : essai sur le giscardisme. Paris: Grasset. ISBN 9782246007463. OCLC 4912647.
- Bothorel, Jean (1981). Un prince : essai sur le pouvoir ordinaire. Paris: Grasset. ISBN 9782246260714. OCLC 10230721.
- Bothorel, Jean (1983). Le Pharaon, 19 mai 1974-22 mars 1978. Paris: Grasset. ISBN 9782246287810. OCLC 10563745.
- Bothorel, Jean (1984). Lettre ouverte aux douze soupirants de l'Elysée. Paris: Albin Michel. ISBN 9782226020963. OCLC 13271262.
- Bothorel, Jean (1986). Toi, mon fils. Paris: Grasset. ISBN 9782246357711. OCLC 19768492.
- Bothorel, Jean (1989). Bernard Grasset : vie et passions d'un éditeur. Paris: Grasset. ISBN 9782246382812. OCLC 21054810.
- Bothorel, Jean (1993). Louise de Vilmorin. Paris: Grasset. ISBN 9782246439813. OCLC 29956398.
- Bothorel, Jean (1995). Un si jeune président. Paris: Grasset. ISBN 9782246493211. OCLC 32855652.
- Bothorel, Jean (1996). Des yeux pour voir : entretiens avec Patrick Shelley. Paris: Jean Picollec. ISBN 9782864771609. OCLC 36705859.
- Bothorel, Jean (1996). Le bal des vautours : pamphlet. Paris: Jean Picollec. ISBN 9782738658302. OCLC 37019868.
- Bothorel, Jean (1998). Bernanos, le mal pensant. Paris: Grasset. ISBN 9782246519614. OCLC 39117092.
- Bothorel, Jean (2000). Le désir et la mort : roman. Paris: Albin Michel. ISBN 9782226115676. OCLC 44572081.
- Bothorel, Jean (2001). Un terroriste Breton. Paris: Calmann-Lévy. ISBN 9782702132098. OCLC 47275695.
- Bothorel, Jean; Sassier, Phillippe (2002). Ernest-Antoine Seillière : le baron de la République. Paris: Robert Laffont. ISBN 9782221093573. OCLC 51638015.
- Bothorel, Jean (2003). François Pinault : une enfance bretonne. Paris: Robert Laffont. ISBN 9782221097472. OCLC 56405699.
- Bothorel, Jean (2005). Celui qui voulait tout changer : les années JJSS. Paris: Robert Laffont. ISBN 9782221101247. OCLC 58049338.
- Bothorel, Jean (2005). La grande distribution : enquête sur une corruption à la française. Paris: Bourin. ISBN 9782849410226. OCLC 470246128.
- Barre, Raymond; Bothorel, Jean (2007). L'Expérience du pouvoir : conversations avec Jean Bothorel. Paris: Fayard. ISBN 9782213630311.
- Bothorel, Jean; Klein, Théo (2007). Une manière d'être juif : conversations avec Jean Bothorel. Paris: Fayard. ISBN 9782213630243. OCLC 237214201.
- Bothorel, Jean (2007). Vincent Bolloré : une histoire de famille. Paris: Jean Picollec. ISBN 9782864772293. OCLC 470742400.
- Bothorel, Jean (2008). Chers imposteurs. Paris: Fayard. ISBN 9782213634524. OCLC 251904024.
- Bothorel, Jean; Condé, Alpha (2010). Un Africain engagé : ce que je veux pour la Guinée. Paris: Jean Picollec. ISBN 9782864772446. OCLC 650206262.
- Bothorel, Jean (2011). Requiem pour les Français : 30 ans de lâcheté politique. Paris: François Bourin. ISBN 9782849412497. OCLC 755062363.
- Bothorel, Jean (2014). Réfractaire : du FLB aux Bonnets rouges. Spézet: Coop Breizh. ISBN 9782843466793. OCLC 903873582.
