= Veulettes-sur-Mer =

- Commune
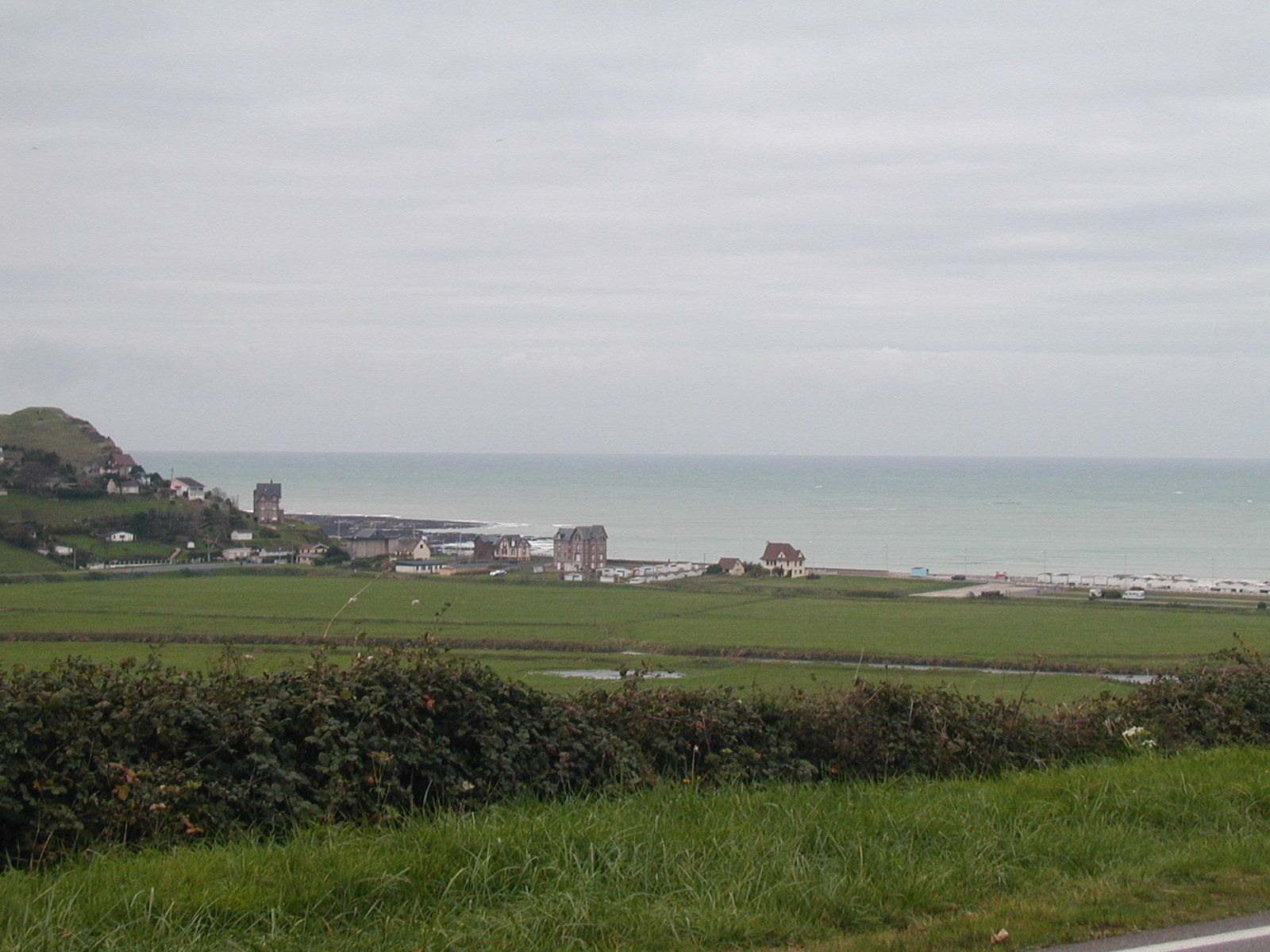
- A general view of Veulettes-sur-Mer

- Coat of arms
- Location of Veulettes-sur-Mer
- Location within France Location within Normandy
- Coordinates: 49°50′52″N 0°35′49″E
- Country: France
- Region: Normandy
- Department: Seine-Maritime
- Arrondissement: Dieppe
- Canton: Saint-Valery-en-Caux
- Intercommunality: CC Côte d'Albâtre

Government
  - Mayor (2026–32): Françoise Guillot
- Area^{1}: 4.71 km^{2} (1.82 sq mi)
- Elevation: 10 m (33 ft)
- Highest elevation: 81 m (266 ft)
- Lowest elevation: 0 m (0 ft)
- Population (2023): 267
  - Density: 56.7/km^{2} (147/sq mi)
- Time zone: UTC+01:00 (CET)
  - Summer (DST): UTC+02:00 (CEST)
- INSEE/Postal code: 76736 /76450
- ^{1} French Land Register data, which excludes lakes, ponds, glaciers > 1 km^{2} (0.386 sq mi or 247 acres) and river estuaries.

Veulettes-sur-Mer (French pronunciation: [vølɛt syʁ mɛʁ], literally Veulettes on Sea) is a commune in the Seine-Maritime department in the Normandy region in northern France.

== Geography ==
A tourism and farming village situated on the coast of the English Channel in the Pays de Caux, some 27 miles (43 km) southwest of Dieppe at the junction of the D79 and the D271. The river Durdent flows to the sea here through the pebble beach (the longest in the department at 2 km) and huge chalk cliffs which rise up to face the sea .

== Heraldry ==
Arms of Veulettes-sur-Mer	The arms of Veulettes-sur-Mer are blazoned : Azure, in fess 2 roses Or and in pale a crescent and a heart with a cross on top argent (those 4 charges in a lozenge formation), and in chief a label argent.

== Population ==
Historical population
Year	Pop.	±% p.a.
1968	363	—
1975	342	−0.85%
1982	369	+1.09%
1990	299	−2.60%
1999	296	−0.11%
2007	324	+1.14%
2012	315	−0.56%
2017	275	−2.68%
2023	267	−0.49%
Source: INSEE

== Places of interest ==
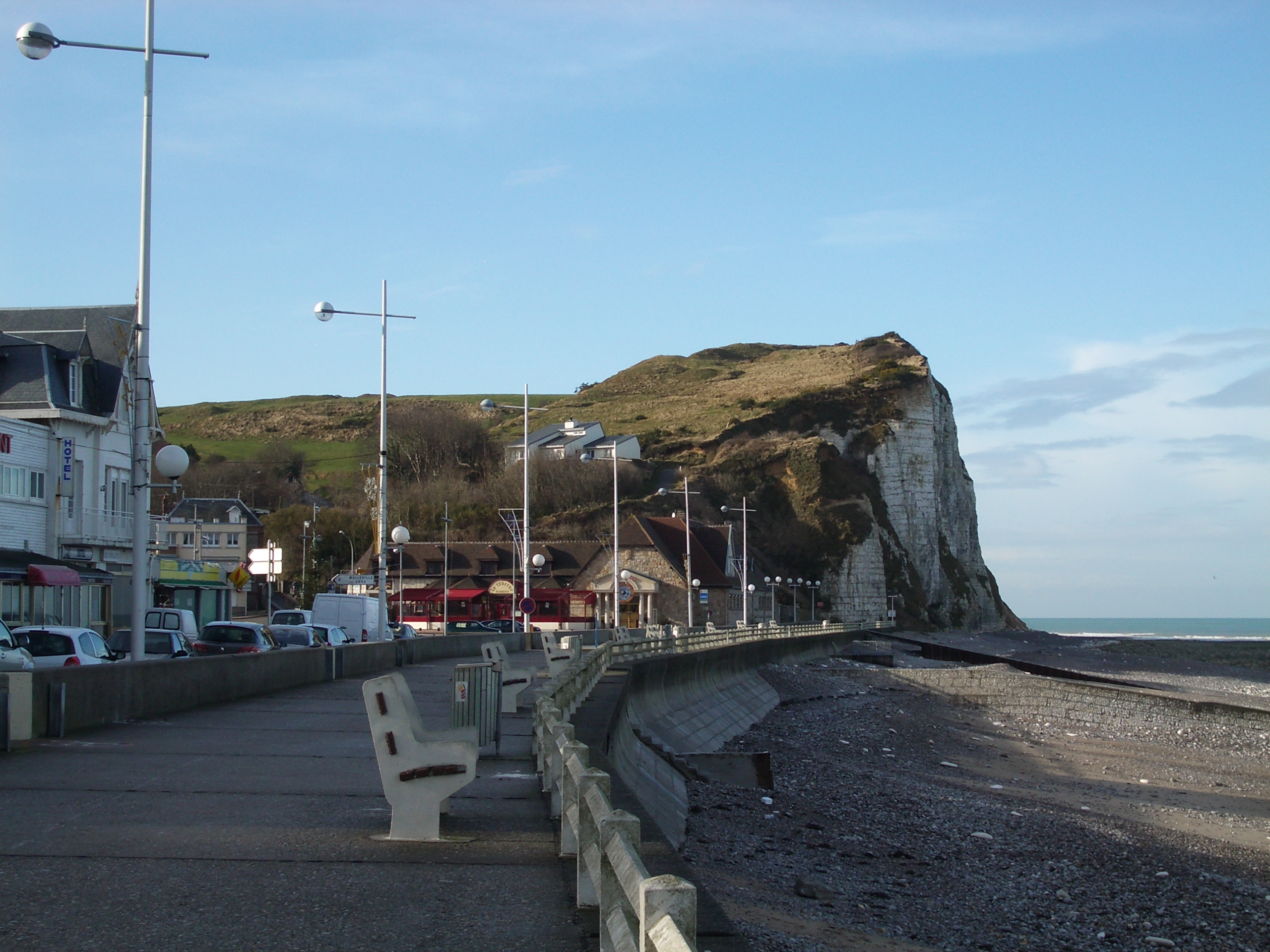
The cliffs of Veulettes, from the former promenade

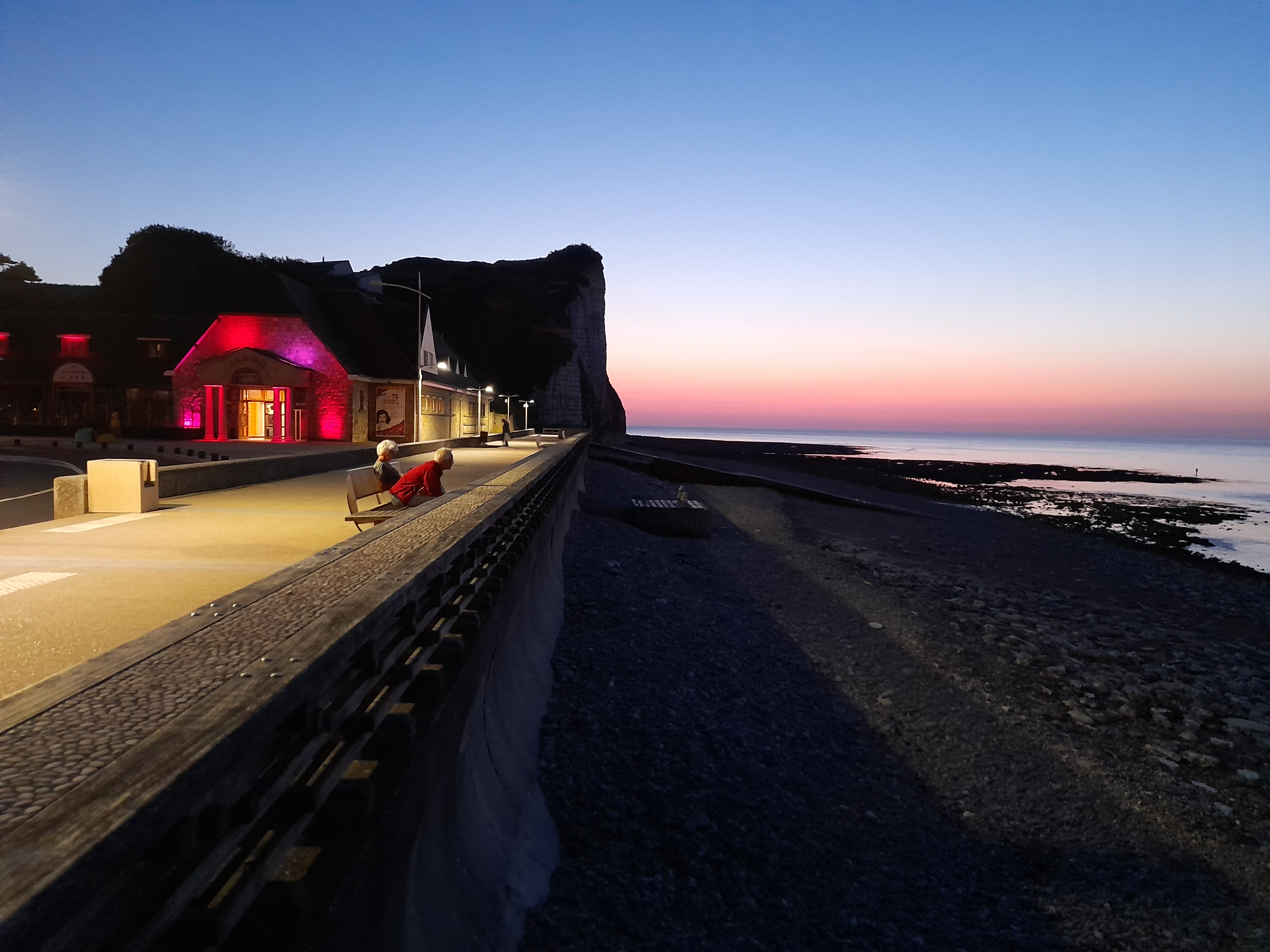
- The new promenade along the sea, on the sunset
  The church of St. Valery, dating from the twelfth century.
- A sixteenth-century stone cross.
- The cliffs.

== People ==
- Jean-Jacques Servan-Schreiber (1924–2006) journalist, essayist and politician lived here.

== See also ==
- Communes of the Seine-Maritime department
