= Maurice Fontaine =

French politician

Member of the French Senate from Gard
- In office 1976–1980

Mayor of Aigues-Mortes
- In office 1965–1977

Personal details
- Born: 20 September 1919 Aigues-Mortes, Gard, France
- Died: 2 January 2015 (aged 95) Aigues-Mortes, Gard, France
- Occupation: Viticulturist

Maurice Fontaine (20 September 1919 – 2 January 2015) was a French politician.

== Biography ==
He was born in 1919, and was a viticulturist. In 1965, he was elected mayor of Aigues-Mortes, a position he would hold until 1977. He ran for the position of Senator from Gard in 1971, placing second to Suzanne Crémieux. When she died in 1976, he succeeded automatically to her place. In the Senate, he was a member of the "Groupe de la Gauche démocratique".

He was not re-elected at the next election, in 1980.
