= Christiane Collange =

French journalist and author (1930–2023)

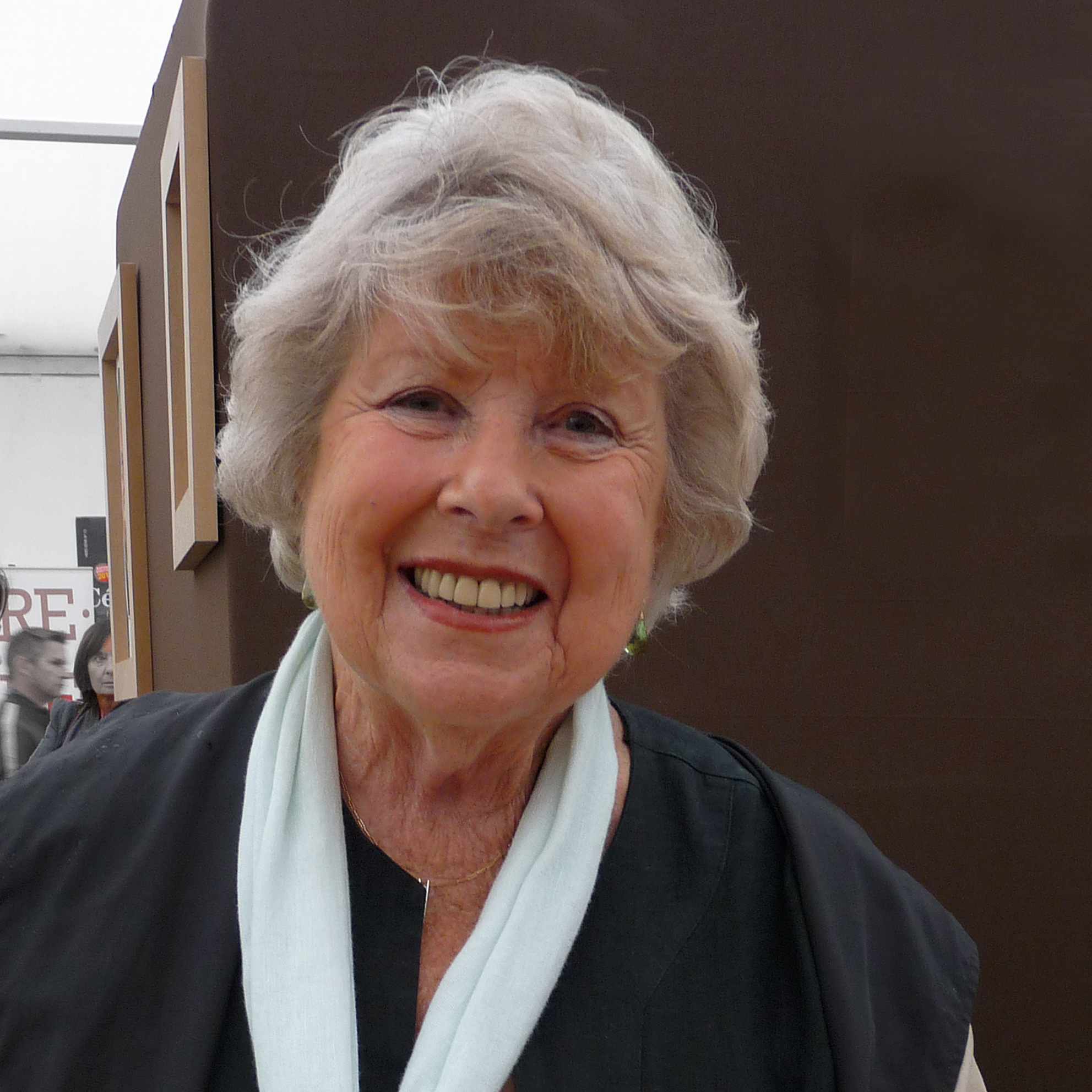
- Christiane Collange in 2011
- Born: Christiane Servan-Schreiber; 29 October 1930; Paris, France
- Died: 24 October 2023 (aged 92); Saint-Valery-en-Caux, Seine-Maritime, France
- Education: Sciences Po
- Occupation: Journalist
- Spouse: 3, including Jean Ferniot
- Children: Vincent Ferniot
- Parent(s): Émile Servan-Schreiber; Denise Brésard
- Relatives: Jean-Jacques Servan-Schreiber (brother); Jean-Louis Servan-Schreiber (brother); Brigitte Gros (sister); Fabienne Servan-Schreiber (niece)

Christiane Collange (29 October 1930 – 24 October 2023) was a French journalist and author.

== Early life ==
Collange was born as Christiane Servan-Schreiber on 29 October 1930. Her father, Émile Servan-Schreiber, was a Jewish journalist and author. Her mother, Denise Brésard, was Roman Catholic. Her paternal father, Joseph Schreiber, was a Jewish-Prussian immigrant. She had two brothers, Jean-Jacques Servan-Schreiber and Jean-Louis Servan-Schreiber, and two sisters, Brigitte Gros and Bernadette Gradis. The Servan-Schreiber family (up to 200 members) have a family reunion every five years.

Collange graduated from Sciences Po.

== Career ==
Collange was a journalist. She was the editor of Madame Express, a supplement of L'Express. She became the editor-in-chief of Le Jardin des Modes in 1970.

She was the author of many books. In her first book, Madame et le management, published in 1969, she argued that women should run their households like a business.

She served on the honorary committee of the Association pour le droit de mourir dans la dignité, a pro-euthanasia organization.

== Personal life ==
Collange married and divorced three times. With one of her husbands, journalist and author Jean Ferniot, she had a son, Vincent Ferniot. She died on 24 October 2023, at the age of 92, five days shy of her 93rd birthday.

== Works ==
- Collange, Christiane (1969). Madame et le management. Paris: Tchou. OCLC 2945519.
- Collange, Christiane (1972). Madame et le bonheur. Paris: Robert Laffont. OCLC 683281.
- Collange, Christiane (1978). Je veux rentrer à la maison. Paris: Club français du livre. OCLC 461703622.
- Collange, Christiane (1981). Ça va les hommes ?. Paris: Bernard Grasset. ISBN 9782246254317. OCLC 7969540.
- Collange, Christiane (1983). Le divorce-boom. Paris: Fayard. ISBN 9782213012506. OCLC 10183380.
- Collange, Christiane (1985). Moi, ta mere. Paris: Fayard. ISBN 9782213015231. OCLC 299390276.
- Collange, Christiane (1987). Chers enfants. Paris: Fayard. ISBN 9782213018713. OCLC 19812340.
- Collange, Christiane (1989). Nos sous. Paris: Fayard. ISBN 9782213021782. OCLC 20332957.
- Collange, Christiane (1990). Moi, ta fille. Paris: Fayard. ISBN 9782213024622. OCLC 22994280.
- Collange, Christiane (1992). Dessine-moi une famille. Paris: Fayard. ISBN 9782213027227. OCLC 299436661.
- Collange, Christiane (1993). La politesse du cœur. Paris: Stock. ISBN 9782234026117. OCLC 414971604.
- Collange, Christiane; Gallois, Claire (1994). La grosse et la maigre. Paris: Albin Michel. ISBN 9782226069627. OCLC 32920599.
- Collange, Christiane (1997). Toi mon senior. Paris: Fayard. ISBN 9782213598444. OCLC 300103714.
- Collange, Christiane (1998). Merci, mon siècle. Paris: Fayard. ISBN 9782213600567. OCLC 299884177.
- Collange, Christiane (2001). Nous, les belles-mères. Paris: Fayard. ISBN 9782213608549. OCLC 299641909.
- Collange, Christiane (2005). La deuxième vie des femmes. Paris: Robert Laffont. ISBN 9782221103005. OCLC 300271823.
- Collange, Christiane (2007). Sacrées grands-mères!. Paris: Robert Laffont. ISBN 9782221106853. OCLC 319901620.
- Collange, Christiane (2009). Pitié pour vos rides : enquête vérité sur le monde de l'esthétique. Paris: Robert Laffont. ISBN 9782221111239. OCLC 718261870.
- Collange, Christiane (2011). Le jeu des 7 familles : pour une cohabitation harmonieuse entre les générations. Paris: Robert Laffont. ISBN 9782221116784. OCLC 706016640.
