= Les Echos (France) =

French newspaper

- Type: Daily financial newspaper
- Format: Berliner
- Owner: LVMH
- Publisher: Les Echos-Le Parisien Médias
- Editor-in-chief: François Vidal
- Founded: 1908; 118 years ago
- Political alignment: economic liberal
- Language: French
- Headquarters: Paris
- Circulation: 139,877 (as of 2022)
- ISSN: 0153-4831 (print); 2270-5279 (web)
- Website: lesechos.fr

Les Echos (French pronunciation: [lez‿eko]) is the first daily French financial newspaper, founded in 1908 by brothers Robert and Émile Servan-Schreiber. Owned by LVMH, it has an economic liberal stance and "defend[s] the idea that market is superior to plan". Les Echos is the main competitor of La Tribune, a rival financial paper.

== History and profile ==
The paper was established as a four-page monthly publication under Les Echos de l'Exportation by brothers Robert and Émile Servan-Schreiber in 1908.

Becoming weekly in 1913, Les Echos de l'Exportation printed 5,000 copies.

The newspaper ceased publication during the First World War. It reappeared at the war's end under Les Echos.

In 1928, Les Echos became a daily newspaper. It became an authoritative newspaper for economic circles in 1937. It was suspended in 1939.

Les Echos resumed its activities in 1945, with relevant topics for this time, such as textiles and mechanics.

The period from 1945 to 1960 was described as "the Servan-Schreiber years", with the involvement of Jean-Jacques (L'Express' founder), son of Émile, as well as Marie-Claire and Jean-Claude, children of Robert. However, tensions began to grow in the early 1960s.

Pascale Santi of Le Monde wrote that it was the "clan war in the Servan-Schreiber family that had led to the sale of the newspaper". Les Echos was sold to Pierre and Jacqueline Beytout in 1963, who had only one objective: to make the newspaper a "genuine" economic daily with an international perspective. Jacqueline, chief executive officer of Les Echos, was also the publishing director from 1966 to 1989.

In 1986, Jacqueline appointed her grandson Nicolas Beytout editor-in-chief, a position he kept until September 2004, when he was assigned the same duty at Le Figaro.

Les Echos evolved, and sales increased as the 1990s approached, the newspaper becoming a newspaper of record in the French economic sector. The turnover was 600 million francs during this period, whereas it was 11 million francs in 1962.

The British media group Pearson PLC bought the newspaper in 1988. However, the French government did not appreciate that Jacqueline Beytout sold Les Echos group to a foreign group, in particular the Minister of the Economy and Finance Édouard Balladur, who vehemently opposed the sale, stating at the beginning of 1988 that "the communitarian character of the Pearson group is not sustainably established today". 67% of the Les Echos group was sold after a fierce struggle for 880 million francs, and Pearson's acquisition of the remaining 33% was concluded in 1989. Jacqueline had a disagreement with the newspaper's new shareholder and left office the following year.

The newspaper was headquartered in Paris, and a website was launched in 1996.

In September 2003, Les Echos switched from tabloid format to Berliner format.

In 2004, the newspaper won the EPICA award.

In 2006, the turnover of Les Echos was 126.2 million euros (US$167.5 million in 2023).

In 2007, the LVMH group, headed by French billionaire Bernard Arnault, bought Les Echos from Pearson.

In 2010, the coverage of Les Echos was expanded to cover such topics as innovations in science, technologies, green growth, medicine and health and skills concerning marketing and advertising, management, education, strategy and leadership, law and finance.

In 2013, the newspaper started a project called LesEchos360, a business news aggregation platform.

In March 2023, Arnault fired Les Echos' editor-in-chief, Nicolas Barré, which sparked a protest among journalists. Barré was replaced by François Vidal.

The Financial Times has described Les Echos as "France's largest business newspaper". The newspaper publishes economical analyses by leading economists, including Joseph Stiglitz and Kenneth Rogoff. Les Echos-Le Parisien Group, owned by LVMH, publish the newspaper.

== Editorial stance, censorship and political position ==
Les Echos has an economic liberal stance and is published on weekdays. According to one of the former managing editors, Jacques Barraux, "the orientation of the journal is essentially economic liberal: we defend the idea that market is superior to plan. Consequently, we believe that private enterprise is the most effective tool, even if it is not the only one."

In 2017, the society of Les Echos journalists also protested against the censorship of an interview with left-wing politician François Ruffin in a press release, forcing the managing editor to justify himself publicly, claiming that he did not want to give publicity to someone who was "denigrating their newspaper in terms that are not in the realm of debate - which is legitimate - but systematically caricatured".

Arnault was heard in January 2022 by the Senate committee investigating media concentration. He said: "If tomorrow Les Echos defended Marxist economics, I would be extremely embarrassed."

Les Echos has opposed the left-wing coalition in the 2022 French legislative elections.

== Circulation ==
In 2000, Les Echos was the sixth best-selling newspaper in France with a circulation of 728,000 copies. The 2009 circulation of the paper was 127,000 copies. From July 2011 to July 2012, the paper had a circulation of 120,546 copies. In 2020, the newspaper had a total circulation of 135,196 copies.
