= Jean Ferniot =

French writer

- Born: 10 October 1918; 14th arrondissement of Paris, France
- Died: 21 July 2012 (aged 93); 13th arrondissement of Paris, France
- Education: Lycée Louis-le-Grand
- Occupations: Journalist; Novelist
- Spouse: 3 (including Christiane Collange)
- Children: 5 (including Vincent Ferniot)

Jean Ferniot (10 October 1918 – 21 July 2012) was a French journalist and novelist. He won the Prix Interallié in 1961.

== Early life ==
Ferniot was born on 10 October 1918 in Paris, France. He grew up in the 14th arrondissement of Paris. He became an orphan at the age of eight, when his mother died. He was raised as a Roman Catholic, and he considered becoming a priest as a young man.

Ferniot was educated at the Lycée Louis-le-Grand in Paris. He briefly served in World War II, and he was subsequently awarded the Croix de Guerre.

== Career ==
Ferniot was a journalist. He began his career at the Agence France-Presse. He subsequently worked for Franc-Tireur and France Soir. He then joined L'Express as a political and culinary columnist. He was also a contributor to Radio Luxembourg until 1983.

Ferniot was the author of several books. He won the Prix Interallié for L’Ombre portée in 1961. He was a Commander of the Ordre des Arts et des Lettres.

== Personal life and death ==
Ferniot was married three times. With his second wife, journalist Christiane Collange, he had two sons, Vincent Ferniot and Simon Ferniot. He has five children.

He died on 21 July 2012 in Paris. He was 93 years old.

== Works ==
- Ferniot, Jean (1958). Les ides de mai. Paris: Librairie Plon. OCLC 2468993.
- Ferniot, Jean (1961). L'Ombre portée. Paris: Gallimard. OCLC 560160135.
- Ferniot, Jean (1962). Pour le pire. Paris: Gallimard. OCLC 490866038.
- Ferniot, Jean (1964). Derrière la fenêtre. Paris: Gallimard. OCLC 715922649.
- Ferniot, Jean (1965). De Gaulle et le 13 mai. Paris: Plon. OCLC 4400976.
- Ferniot, Jean (1968). Mort d'une révolution, la gauche de mai. Paris: Denoël. OCLC 1262410.
- Ferniot, Jean (1972). Complainte contre X. Paris: Gallimard. OCLC 2205610.
- Ferniot, Jean (1972). 8 h 15: de De Gaulle à Pompidou. Paris: Plon. OCLC 682527.
- Ferniot, Jean (1973). Pierrot et Aline. Paris: Grasset. OCLC 705134.
- Ferniot, Jean (1973). Ça suffit!. Paris: Grasset. ISBN 9782246118718. OCLC 681212.
- Ferniot, Jean (1974). La Petite Légume. Paris: Mercure de France. OCLC 2075163.
- Ferniot, Jean (1976). Les honnêtes gens. Paris: Gallimard. OCLC 2877030.
- Ferniot, Jean (1977). C'est ça, la France. Paris: Julliard. ISBN 9782260000945. OCLC 3588666.
- Ferniot, Jean (1979). Vous en avez vraiment assez d'être français?. Paris: Grasset. ISBN 9782246007449. OCLC 6225154.
- Ferniot, Jean (1982). Le Pouvoir et la Sainteté. Paris: Grasset. ISBN 9782246279518. OCLC 8909859.
- Ferniot, Jean (1983). Le chien-loup. Paris: Grasset. ISBN 9782246287216. OCLC 10525283.
- Ferniot, Jean (1984). Saint Judas : roman. Paris: Grasset. ISBN 9782246312918. OCLC 11076141.
- Ferniot, Jean (1986). Un mois de juin comme on les aimait. Paris: Grasset. ISBN 9782246363316. OCLC 13882540.
- Ferniot, Jean (1988). Soleil orange. Paris: Grasset. ISBN 9782246374411. OCLC 18063620.
- Ferniot, Jean (1989). Miracle au village. Paris: Grasset. ISBN 9782246408116. OCLC 20922445.
- Ferniot, Jean (1991). Je recommencerais bien. Paris: Grasset. ISBN 9782246421818. OCLC 26364122.
- Ferniot, Jean (1993). L'Europe à table. Paris: Editions du Mécène. ISBN 9782907970099. OCLC 29775979.
- Ferniot, Jean (1994). Jérusalem, nombril du monde. Paris: Grasset. ISBN 9782246435617. OCLC 32858660.
- Ferniot, Jean (1995). La Mouffe. Paris: Editions de Mécène. ISBN 9782907970181. OCLC 34776201.
- Ferniot, Jean (1996). Morte saison. Paris: Grasset. ISBN 9782246511717. OCLC 34774238.
- Ferniot, Jean; Moreno, Ymelda (1996). Chère pomme de terre. Paris: Éditions Générales First. ISBN 9782876913271. OCLC 36883098.
- Ferniot, Jean (1999). Un temps pour aimer, un temps pour haïr. Paris: Grasset. ISBN 9782246550112. OCLC 41506780.
- Ferniot, Jean (2002). Ce soir ou jamais. Paris: Grasset. ISBN 9782246605218. OCLC 50333644.
- Ferniot, Jean (2003). Noces de nuit. Paris: Grasset. ISBN 9782246587415. OCLC 52547255.
- Ferniot, Jean (2004). C'était ma France. Paris: Grasset. ISBN 9782246653318. OCLC 55144520.
- Ferniot, Jean (2006). L'enfant du miracle. Paris: Grasset. ISBN 9782246689713.
- Ferniot, Jean (2007). Vivre avec ou sans Dieu. Paris: Grasset. ISBN 9782246568018. OCLC 137292870.
- Ferniot, Jean (2009). Ah, que la politique était jolie!. Paris: Grasset. ISBN 9782246725213. OCLC 626948911.
- Ferniot, Jean (2011). Caprices de la chair. Paris: Grasset. ISBN 9782246770718. OCLC 703208899.
