= Lire (magazine) =

French literary magazine

- Editor-in-chief: Baptiste Liger
- Categories: Literature
- Frequency: 12 per year
- Total circulation: 57,216 (2013)
- Founder: Jean-Louis Servan-Schreiber; Bernard Pivot
- First issue: 1975; 51 years ago
- Company: EMC2
- Country: France
- Based in: Paris
- Language: French
- Website: lire.fr
- ISSN: 0338-5019

Lire (literally, to read) is a French literary magazine covering both French and foreign literature. The magazine was founded in 1975 by Jean-Louis Servan-Schreiber and Bernard Pivot. It was owned by the Roularta Media Group until January 2015 when it was acquired by French businessman Patrick Drahi. In 2016, Drahi sold his magazines to SFR. In 2017, Lire was acquired by Jean-Jacques Augier and Stéphane Chabenat.
