= Brigitte Gros =

French journalist and politician

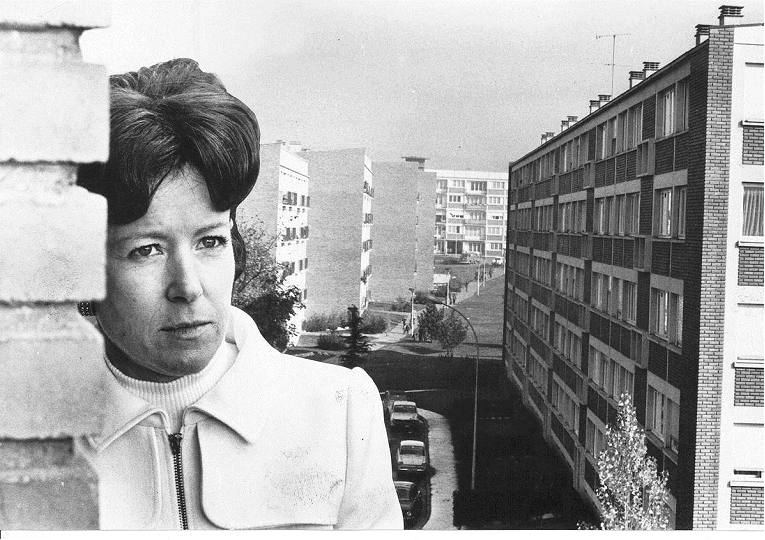
- Brigitte Gros in 1971

Member of the French Senate for Yvelines
- In office 1973–1985
- Preceded by: Aimé Bergeal

Mayor of Meulan-en-Yvelines
- In office 1963–1985
- Succeeded by: Marie-Thérèse Pirolli

Personal details
- Born: Brigitte Servan-Schreiber; 12 June 1925 Saint-Germain-en-Laye, France
- Died: 11 March 1985 (aged 59) Meulan-en-Yvelines, France
- Party: Radical Party
- Spouse: Emeric Gros
- Children: 4
- Parent(s): Émile Servan-Schreiber; Denise Brésard
- Relatives: Jean-Jacques Servan-Schreiber (brother); Jean-Louis Servan-Schreiber (brother); Christiane Collange (sister); Fabienne Servan-Schreiber (niece)

Brigitte Gros (12 June 1925 – 11 March 1985) was a French journalist and politician. She served as the mayor of Meulan-en-Yvelines and as a member of the French Senate. She was the author of several books.

== Early life ==
Brigitte Gros was born as Brigitte Servan-Schreiber on 12 June 1925 in Saint-Germain-en-Laye, France. Her father, Émile Servan-Schreiber, was a Jewish author. Her mother, Denise Brésard, was Roman Catholic.

During World War II, she joined the French Resistance and served in the maquis of Ain under Léo Hamon. However, she was arrested and tortured by the Gestapo on 15 August 1944. During the liberation of France, she served under General Jean de Lattre de Tassigny. She was a recipient of the Croix de Guerre for her service.

== Career ==
Gros first worked as a journalist for Les Échos and Paris-Presse. She joined L'Express in 1955. She published her first novel in 1960.

Gros was elected to the city council of Meulan in 1965. She served as its mayor from 1966 to 1985. During her tenure, she oversaw the construction of the Paradis neighbourhood and the Henri-IV Hospital in Meulan.

Gros served as a member of the French Senate from 1977 to 1985. During her tenure, she worked on policies to support low-income housing known as HLM. Additionally, she argued that each French family should be able to own a house. Meanwhile, she authored a report in favour of the establishment of the Solidarity tax on wealth in 1980 (implemented in 1981). She also voted in favour of abortion and looser divorce regulations as well as the repeal of the death penalty.

== Personal life, death and legacy ==
She married Emeric Gros; they had four children, Olivier, France, François and Catherine.

Gros died on 11 March 1985 in Meulan-en-Yvelines, France. The Place Brigitte-Gros, a town square, and the Centre Brigitte Gros, a hospital, both of which are based in Meulan, are named in her memory. Meanwhile, a ceremony to commemorate the 30th anniversary of her death was held in Meulan on 13 February 2016.

== Works ==
- Gros, Brigitte (1960). Véronique dans l'appareil : roman. Paris: Éditions Julliard. OCLC 10795621.
- Gros, Brigitte (1970). Quatre heures de transport par jour. Paris: Denoël. OCLC 7131083.
- Gros, Brigitte (1973). Les paradisiennes. Paris: Robert Laffont. OCLC 668685.
- Gros, Brigitte (1977). Une maison pour chaque Français. Paris: Fayard. ISBN 9782213004396. OCLC 3846783.
- Gros, Brigitte (1983). Presse, la marée rose. Paris: Editions Albatros. OCLC 12205380.
