= David Servan-Schreiber =

French physician, neuroscientist and author

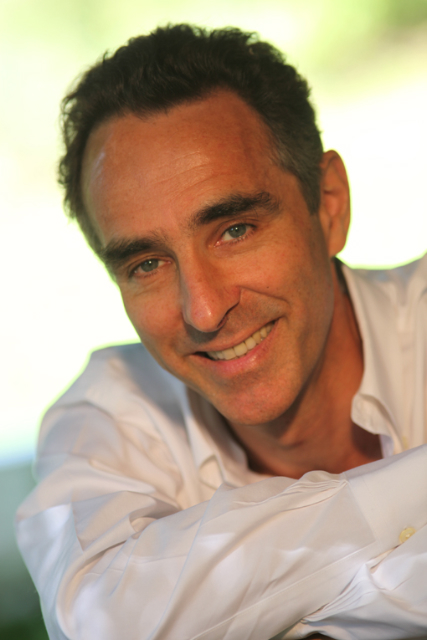

David Servan-Schreiber (April 21, 1961 – July 24, 2011) was a French physician, neuroscientist and author. He was a clinical professor of psychiatry at the University of Pittsburgh School of Medicine. He was also a lecturer in the Faculty of Medicine of Université Claude Bernard Lyon 1.

== Life and career ==
Servan-Schreiber was born in Neuilly-sur-Seine, Hauts-de-Seine, the eldest son of French journalist and politician Jean-Jacques Servan-Schreiber (1924–2006). He became co-founder and then director of the Centre for Integrative Medicine at the University of Pittsburgh Medical Center. Following his volunteer activity as a physician in Iraq in 1991, he was one of the founders of the US branch of Médecins Sans Frontières, the international organization that was awarded the Nobel Peace Prize in 1999. He also served as volunteer in Guatemala, Kurdistan, Tajikistan, India and Kosovo.

In 2002, he was awarded the Pennsylvania Psychiatric Society Presidential Award for Outstanding Career in Psychiatry. He is the author of Healing Without Freud or Prozac (translated in 29 languages, 1.3 million copies sold), and Anticancer: A New Way of Life (translated in 35 languages, New York Times best-seller, 1 million copies in print) in which he discloses his own diagnosis with a malignant brain tumor at the age of 31 and the treatment programme that he put together to help himself beyond his surgery, chemotherapy and radiotherapy.

He was also a regular columnist for Ode magazine and other publications.

== Later life and death ==
Having been treated twice for a malignant brain tumor, Servan-Schreiber became a leading figure in his engagement for integrative medicine approaches to the prevention and treatment of cancer. He popularized his knowledge through teaching seminars, lectures, books, a blog and audiobooks. On July 24, 2011, almost 20 years after his cancer diagnosis, he died of brain cancer.

== Bibliography ==
- Anticancer - Prévenir et lutter grâce à nos défenses naturelles (Paris: Éditions Robert Laffont, 2007) ISBN 978-2-221-10871-0
- On peut se dire au revoir plusieurs fois (Paris: Éditions Robert Laffont, 2011) ISBN 9782221127049
- Healing Without Freud or Prozac (Rodale Books, 2011) ISBN 978-1-4050-7758-3
- The Instinct to Heal: Curing Depression, Anxiety, and Stress Without Drugs and Without Talk Therapy (Rodale Books, 2004) (original: Guérir le stress, l’anxiété et la depression sans médicaments ni psychanalyse, 2003, edition Roberts Laffont, Paris)ISBN 978-1-59486-158-1
