= Fernand Crémieux =

French lawyer and politician

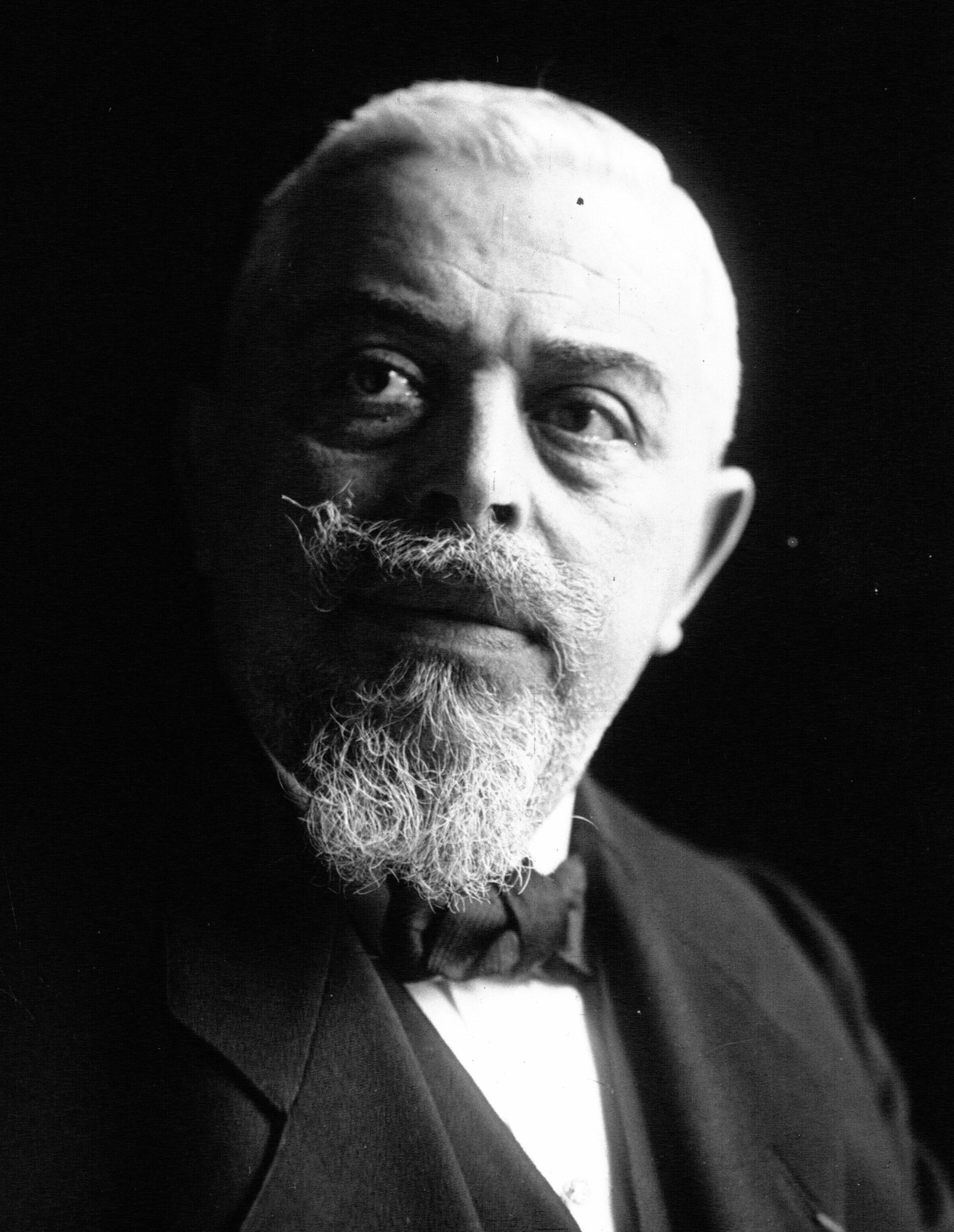
- Fernand Crémieux in 1913
- Born: 15 December 1857; Pont-Saint-Esprit, Gard, France
- Died: 26 November 1928 (aged 70); Paris, France
- Occupations: Lawyer, politician
- Children: Suzanne Crémieux

Fernand Crémieux (15 December 1857 – 26 November 1928) was a French lawyer and politician. He served as a member of the National Assembly from 1885 to 1889, and from 1893 to 1898, representing Gard. He also served as a member of the French Senate from 1903 to 1928, representing Gard.
