= Émile Servan-Schreiber =

French journalist (1888–1967)

- Born: Émile Schreiber; 10 December 1888; 10th arrondissement of Paris, France
- Died: 29 December 1967 (aged 79); Veulettes-sur-Mer, Seine-Maritime, France
- Education: Collège Rollin
- Occupation: Journalist
- Spouse: Denise Brésard
- Children: 2 sons, 3 daughters
- Parent(s): Joseph Schreiber; Clara Feilchenfeld
- Relatives: Vincent Ferniot (grandson)

Émile Servan-Schreiber (French pronunciation: [emil sɛʁvɑ̃ ʃʁɛbɛʁ]; 10 December 1888 – 29 December 1967) was a French journalist. He was the co-founder of Les Échos. He was the author of several books.

== Early life ==
Émile Servan-Schreiber was born as Émile Schreiber on December 20, 1888, in Paris, France. His father, Joseph Schreiber, was a Jewish-Prussian immigrant. His mother, born Clara Feilchenfeld, spoke Yiddish. His patronym, Schreiber, means "writer" in German. He had three brothers, André, Georges and Robert.

Servan-Schreiber was educated at the Collège Rollin in Paris. During World War I, he served in the French Army. He received the Croix de Guerre for his service.

== Career ==
Servan-Schreiber was a journalist. He co-founded Les Échos with his brother André in 1908. He was also a contributor; for example, in 1960, he wrote that the Algerian War could not be compared to World War I, as more French people were dying in car accidents than on the battlefield. The newspaper was sold by the Schreibers in 1963.

Servan-Schreiber was a journalist for L'Illustration. He was the author of several books, beginning with L'exemple américain in 1917, when he called for an Americanisation of France with regards to comfort and cleanliness. His third book, Rome après Moscou, was reviewed by George N. Shuster in Books Abroad, while his fifth book, L'Amérique Réagit, was reviewed by Albert J. Guerard, also in Books Abroad. His ninth book, Le Portugal de Salazar, was reviewed by Armando Frumento in Giornale degli Economisti e Annali di Economia.

== Personal life and death ==
Servan-Schreiber married Denise Brésard, a Roman Catholic. They had two sons, Jean-Jacques Servan-Schreiber and Jean-Louis Servan-Schreiber, and three daughters, Brigitte Gros, Bernadette Gradis, and Christiane Collange.

Prior to World War II, Servan-Schreiber purchased "Chalet Nanouk", a chalet in Mont d'Arbois upon the recommendation of Baroness Noémie de Rothschild. During the war, he took the pseudonym of "Servan" and hid in the chalet with his parents, his wife and his children. Servan-Schreiber legally changed his name on November 5, 1952, adding "Servan" before "Schreiber".

Servan-Schreiber died on December 29, 1967, in Veulettes-sur-Mer, France.

== Works ==
- Schreiber, Émile (1917). L'Exemple américain. Paris: Payot. OCLC 503759096.
- Schreiber, Émile (1931). Comment on vit en U.R.S.S. Paris: Plon. OCLC 459134393.
- Schreiber, Émile (1932). Rome après Moscou. Paris: Plon. OCLC 4221289.
- Schreiber, Émile (1933). Cette année à Jérusalem; à travers la Palestine juive. Paris: Plon. OCLC 1066628.
- Schreiber, Émile (1934). L'Amérique réagit. Paris: Plon. OCLC 503759274.
- Schreiber, Émile (1936). On vit pour 1 franc par jour. Indes-Chine-Japon, 1935. Paris: Baudinière. OCLC 459134406.
- Schreiber, Émile (1936). Heureux Scandinaves! : enquête sur les réalisations socialistes au Danemark, en Suède, Norvège et Finlande. Paris: Denoël et Steele. OCLC 10127363.
- Schreiber, Émile (1937). La Suisse, pays d'hommes libres; enquête sur le démocratie suisse et son rayonnement international. Paris: Denoël. OCLC 7049638.
- Schreiber, Émile (1938). Le Portugal de Salazar. Paris: Denoël. OCLC 21515611.
