= Paul Béchard =

French politician

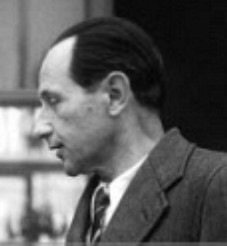
Paul Béchard en 1947.jpg

Paul Béchard (25 December 1899, Alès – 26 April 1982) was a French politician. He represented the French Section of the Workers' International (SFIO) in the Constituent Assembly elected in 1945, in the National Assembly from 1946 to 1948, from 1951 to 1955 and from 1958 to 1967 and in the Senate from 1955 to 1958. From January 27, 1948 to May 24, 1951 he was Governor of French West Africa. He was the mayor of Alès from 1947 to 1948 and from 1953 to 1965.
