= Jean-Jacques Servan-Schreiber =

French journalist and politician (1924–2006)

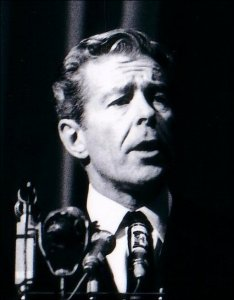
- Servan-Schreiber in 1973

Member of the National Assembly
- In office 1970–1978
- Preceded by: Roger Souchal
- Succeeded by: Yvon Tondon
- Constituency: Moselle's 1st constituency

Minister of Reforms
- In office 28 May 1974 – 9 June 1974
- President: Valéry Giscard d'Estaing
- Prime Minister: Jacques Chirac

Personal details
- Born: 13 February 1924 Paris, France
- Died: 7 November 2006 (aged 82) Fécamp, France
- Party: Radical Party
- Children: 4
- Parent(s): Émile Servan-Schreiber; Denise Bréard
- Relatives: Jean-Louis Servan-Schreiber (brother); Brigitte Gros (sister); Christiane Collange (sister); Fabienne Servan-Schreiber (niece)
- Education: Lycée Janson-de-Sailly
- Alma mater: École Polytechnique
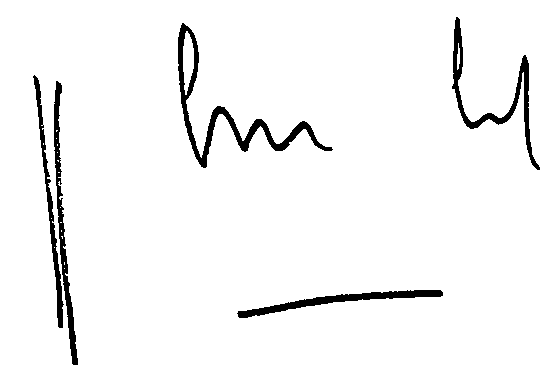
- Signature

Jean-Jacques Servan-Schreiber, often referred to as JJSS (13 February 1924 – 7 November 2006), was a French journalist and politician. He co-founded L'Express in 1953 with Françoise Giroud, and then went on to become president of the Radical Party in 1971. He oversaw its transition to the center-right, the party being thereafter known as Parti radical valoisien. He tried to found in 1972 the Reforming Movement with Christian Democrat Jean Lecanuet, with whom he supported Valéry Giscard d'Estaing's conservative candidature to the 1974 presidential election.

== Biography ==
=== Formative years ===
Jean-Jacques Schreiber (his birth name) was born in Paris, the eldest son of Émile Servan-Schreiber, journalist, who founded the financial newspaper Les Échos, and Denise Brésard. Three of his siblings are Brigitte Gros, former senator of Yvelines and mayor of Meulan, Christiane Collange, journalist, Jean-Louis Servan-Schreiber, journalist.

The Schreiber family is a Jewish family.

Enjoying the full attention of his mother, JJSS was a highly gifted and hard-working child. He studied at the Lycée Janson-de-Sailly and the Lycée de Grenoble, then returned to Paris. Beginning in adolescence, he accompanied his father to meetings with highly placed people such as Raoul Dautry, a cabinet-level officer under both Vichy and liberated France. Having been accepted by the École polytechnique, France's top engineering school in 1943, he joined Charles de Gaulle's Free French Forces with his father and went to Alabama for training as a fighter pilot; however, he never entered combat.

After the liberation, he graduated from Ecole Polytechnique in 1947, but never worked as an engineer. That same year, he married journalist and author Madeleine Chapsal. Fascinated by science and politics, Servan-Schreiber now discovered a taste for writing and journalism. The brilliant 25-year-old was hired to write for the recently founded daily newspaper Le Monde by its founder, Hubert Beuve-Méry, as a foreign affairs editorialist. His deep acquaintance with the United States led him to specialize in the Cold War.

=== L'Express ===
Servan-Schreiber was among the first to recognize the inevitability of decolonization, writing a series of articles on the Indo-Chinese conflict. This led to his meeting the future Prime Minister Pierre Mendès-France, at that time a dedicated opponent of the French military effort in Indo-China. In 1953 Servan-Schreiber co-founded (with Françoise Giroud) the weekly L'Express, initially published as a Saturday supplement to the family-owned newspaper Les Échos. On the magazine's open agenda was the elevation of Mendès-France to power. Due to government seizures and censorship, the magazine quickly enchanted both the youth and the most prominent intellectuals of the 1950s and 1960s with its innovations. Among its contributors were Albert Camus, Jean-Paul Sartre, André Malraux and François Mauriac. During Mendès-France's pivotal eight-month term as Council President (the formal title for the Prime Minister during the Fourth Republic), JJSS served him as a shadow councilor.

Servan-Schreiber was conscripted to Algeria in 1956 – to still his dissent, says Giroud. Drawing on his experiences there, he published his first book, "Lieutenant en Algérie". Its account of the brutality of French repression caused a controversy over its alleged deleterious effect on the army's morale. L'Express ran excerpts from the book.

Servan-Schreiber opposed General De Gaulle's return to power in 1958. However, De Gaulle was successful, and the influence of L'Express began to wane. In the same period, JJSS experienced other upsets. His family lost control of Les Échos; he split politically with Mendès-France; he divorced his first wife, and separated from Françoise Giroud, his mistress since the early 1950s, in order to marry Sabine Becq de Fouquières, who would become the mother of his four sons David, Émile, Franklin, and Édouard.

In 1964 following a study which he commissioned from his brother Jean-Louis, JJSS transformed L'Express into a weekly news magazine patterned after TIME. L'Express soared in popularity once again. It broadened its coverage to such subjects as new technologies and women's liberation. It became a mirror of the changing French society.

=== The American Challenge ===
As the 1960s unfolded, Servan-Schreiber found himself in the position of a rich press lord, a political editorialist always chasing after new ideas. His trenchant analysis drew some of the first minds of his generation to him. Growing more and more disenchanted with De Gaulle's policies, he was no longer willing to settle for an observer's role.

He found a collaborator in Michel Albert, who provided him with extensive documentation to inform his editorials. One of Albert's reports struck him particularly. It presented the United States and Europe as engaged in a silent economic war, in which Europe appeared to be completely outclassed on all fronts: management techniques, technological tools, and research capacity. Servan-Schreiber saw in this thesis the potential for a seminal book. He fleshed it out with reading keys and concrete proposals for a counter-offensive. The result was his international best-seller Le Défi Américain ("The American Challenge", 1967). It sold 600,000 copies in France, unprecedented for a political essay, and was translated into 15 languages. This book was instrumental in creating a resurgence of French nationalism and drawing attention to the importance of transnational cooperation in Europe.

Building on the book's success, he traveled throughout Europe, speaking to packed lecture halls, touting the advantages of a federal Europe with a common currency and of a decentralized France.

=== Political career ===
General De Gaulle's resignation in 1969 persuaded Servan-Schreiber to try his hand at politics. In October 1969, he became secretary-general of the Radical Party. He helped to reform the party, writing its manifesto, and became its president in 1971. After the splitting away of the left-wing Radicals, who formed the Left Radical Party (PRG), Servan-Schreiber became the president of the center-right Parti radical valoisien. He was elected Deputy of Nancy in 1970, but, later on the same year, he made the surprise decision to run against Jacques Chaban-Delmas in Bordeaux. He was soundly defeated, which tarnished his image. He served several terms or partial terms in the French National Assembly, and was Minister for Reform in 1974 but, being opposed to nuclear tests, he was prompted to resign after three weeks by Prime Minister Jacques Chirac. He was elected in 1976 as President of the regional council of Lorraine, defeating Pierre Messmer.

During his political career, he frequently waged progressive campaigns against the current of a sociologically conservative France. He advocated decentralization through regionalization; reallocation of resources from the Concorde program to the Airbus; an end to nuclear testing; reform of the grandes écoles; and computerization. He refused to cooperate with Georges Marchais's Communist Party. He seemed unable to play political power games. His centrist strategy was never successful and eventually brought down his party.

Wanting to extricate himself from the daily management of L'Express, he sold it to financier Jimmy Goldsmith in 1977. Deprived of its power base, his political career quickly deteriorated. He lost his Assembly seat in 1978. He left the party in 1979 at the time of the first direct European elections, to present a list of candidates under the slogan Emploi, Égalité, Europe (Employment, Equality, Europe) with Giroud. The list won only 1.84% of the votes, and Servan-Schreiber decided to retire from political life.

=== Behind-the-scenes participant ===
In 1980 Servan-Schreiber published his second bestseller, Le Défi mondial (The Global Challenge), devoted to the technological rise of Japan through computerization. The book was also later adapted into the documentary television series The World Challenge.

He served once again as shadow councillor to his close acquaintances François Mitterrand and Valéry Giscard d'Estaing; his friendship with the latter went back to the École Polytechnique. However, his initiative to create a centre for the promotion of information technology in France turned into a money pit and closed down in 1986. He then moved to Pittsburgh where he had his four sons (David, Émile, Franklin and Édouard) educated at Carnegie Mellon University, a leader in computer science. Servan-Schreiber directed the university's international relations.

Returning to France, he continued to write, including two volumes of memoirs, until he was afflicted with an Alzheimer's-like degenerative disease. He died following a bronchitis attack in 2006. His eldest son, the psychiatrist and writer David Servan-Schreiber, died in July 2011 at the age of 50 of a brain tumor.

== Bibliography ==
- Jean Bothorel, Celui qui voulait tout changer, Les années JJSS (The Man Who Wanted to Change It All: The JJSS Years), Paris, Robert Laffont, 2005.
- Madeleine Chapsal, L'homme de ma vie, Paris, Fayard, 2004
- Jean-Jacques Servan-Schreiber, Passions, Paris, Fixot, 1991
- Jean-Jacques Servan-Schreiber, Les fossoyeurs (The Gravediggers), Paris, Fixot, 1993
- Alain Rustenholz and Sandrine Treiner, La Saga Servan-Schreiber, Paris, Seuil, 1993
- Serge Siritsky and Françoise Roth, Le roman de L'Express (The Romance of L'Express), Paris, Julian, 1979
