= Jean-Claude Servan-Schreiber =

French politician and journalist (1918–2018)

Deputy of the National Assembly for Seine
- In office 1965–1967

Personal details
- Born: 11 April 1918 8th arrondissement of Paris, France
- Died: 11 April 2018 (aged 100) 7th arrondissement of Paris, France
- Party: Union for the New Republic
- Spouse: Christiane Laroche
- Children: Fabienne Servan-Schreiber
- Parent(s): Robert Servan-Schreiber; Suzanne Crémieux
- Relatives: Henri Weber (son-in-law)
- Education: Lycée Janson-de-Sailly
- Alma mater: Sciences Po; University of Oxford

Jean-Claude Servan-Schreiber (11 April 1918 – 11 April 2018) was a French politician and journalist. He served as a member of the National Assembly from 1965 to 1967, representing Seine. He was a member of the Union for the New Republic, a center-right political party. He died in Paris on 11 April 2018, his 100th birthday.
