= Jean-Louis Servan-Schreiber =

French journalist (1937–2020)

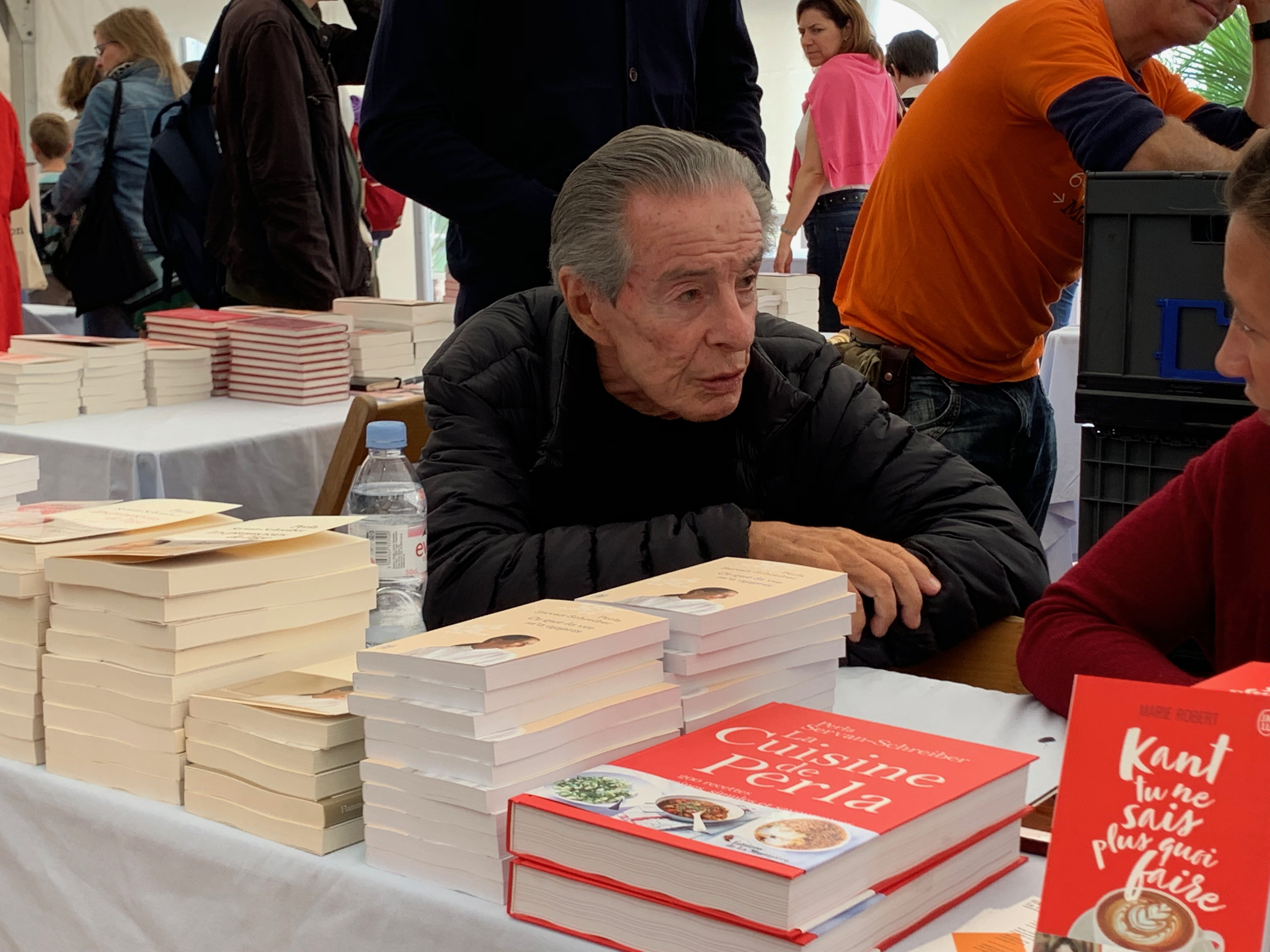
- Servan-Schreiber in 2019
- Born: 31 October 1937; Boulogne-Billancourt, France
- Died: 28 November 2020 (aged 83); Neuilly-sur-Seine, France
- Education: Lycée Saint-Louis-de-Gonzague
- Alma mater: Sciences Po
- Occupation: Journalist
- Spouses: Claude Sadoc; Perla Servan-Schreiber
- Children: 4
- Parent(s): Émile Servan-Schreiber; Denise Bresard
- Relatives: Jean-Jacques Servan-Schreiber (brother); Brigitte Gros (sister); Christiane Collange (sister)

Jean-Louis Servan-Schreiber (French pronunciation: [ʒɑ̃ lwi sɛʁvɑ̃ ʃʁɛbɛʁ]; 31 October 1937 – 28 November 2020) was a French journalist. He was the co-founder of L'Expansion and the founder of Psychologies and Radio Classique. He was the author of several books.

== Early life ==
Jean-Louis Servan-Schreiber was born on 31 October 1937, in Boulogne-Billancourt, France. His father, Émile Servan-Schreiber, was a French journalist of Jewish-Prussian descent. His mother was Denise Bresard. The Servan-Schreibers (up to 200 members) have a family reunion every five years.

As a child Servan-Schreiber aspired to become a psychoanalyst but, being born into a family of journalists went into that profession. He graduated from Sciences Po in 1960.

== Career ==
Servan-Schreiber was a journalist. He first wrote for Echos, which had been co-founded by his father, followed by L'Express which had been founded by his brother Jean-Jacques Servan-Schreiber. Having experience of reading American news magazines from a period spent teaching at Stanford University Servan-Schreiber worked with his brother to transform L'Express into a similar publication, the first of its kind in France.

Servan-Schreiber went on to found his own press company, L'Expansion, in 1967 with Jean Boissonnat. He co-founded the magazine L'Expansion with Boissonnat in 1967 and Lire with Bernard Pivot in 1975. Servan-Schreiber would remain a director of L'Expansion for 27 years, and expand it to several foreign editions. He founded Radio Classique in 1982. He was the owner of La Vie Éco, a Moroccan newspaper, from 1994 to 1997, having acquired a special exemption from that nation's foreign ownership rules via Moroccan prime minister Abdellatif Filali. Servan-Schreiber took over Psychologies in 1997, and sold it to the Lagardère Group in 2008 having increased its circulation from 75,000 to 350,000 to become the second best-selling women's monthly in France. He founded another magazine, Clés, in 2010. At times the L'Expansion group also ran La Vie Financière, La Lettre de L’Expansion and La Tribune.

During the 1970s Servan-Schreiber appeared frequently on the TF1 programme Questionnaire. Servan-Schreiber was the author of several books and around twenty essays. He served as the chairman of the French chapter of Human Rights Watch since 2007. Servan-Schreiber was known by the initials JLSS.

== Personal life ==
Servan-Schreiber was married twice. He married his first wife, Claude Sadoc, in 1957. They had four children; she is now married to a woman, former politician Françoise Gaspard. In 1987, he married his second wife, Perla.

He died from COVID-19 on 28 November 2020, at the age of 83.

== Works ==
- Servan-Schreiber, Jean-Louis (1972). Le pouvoir d'informer. Paris: Robert Laffont. OCLC 829966.
- Servan-Schreiber, Jean-Louis (1973). L'Entreprise à visage humain. Paris: Robert Laffont. OCLC 253724937.
- Servan-Schreiber, Jean-Louis (1977). A mi-vie : l'entrée en quarantaine. France: Stock. ISBN 9782234005464. OCLC 3041952.
- Servan-Schreiber, Jean-Louis (1977). Questionnaire pour Demain. Paris: Ramsay. ISBN 9782859560232. OCLC 3390514.
- Servan-Schreiber, Jean-Louis (1983). L'Art du Temps. Paris: Fayard. ISBN 9782253035718. OCLC 471808221.
- Servan-Schreiber, Jean-Louis (1986). Le retour du courage. Paris: Fayard. ISBN 9782213016986. OCLC 13655205.
- Servan-Schreiber, Jean-Louis; Servan-Schreiber, Perla (1990). Le Métier de patron. Paris: Fayard. ISBN 9782213024387. OCLC 21279971.
- Servan-Schreiber, Jean-Louis (1999). Le nouvel art du temps : contre le stress. Paris: Albin Michel. ISBN 9782226113870. OCLC 467970329.
- Servan-Schreiber, Jean-Louis (2002). Vivre Content. Paris: Albin Michel. ISBN 9782226135223. OCLC 469576579.
- Servan-Schreiber, Jean-Louis (2010). Trop vite! : pourquoi nous sommes prisonniers du court terme. Paris: Albin Michel. ISBN 9782226206145. OCLC 690864926.
- Servan-Schreiber, Jean-Louis (2012). Aimer (quand même) le XXIe siècle. Paris: Albin Michel. ISBN 9782226243805. OCLC 816606159.
- Servan-Schreiber, Jean-Louis (2014). Pourquoi les riches ont gagné. Paris: Albin Michel. ISBN 9782226254702. OCLC 880252331.
- Servan-Schreiber, Jean-Louis (2015). C'est la vie ! : essais. Paris: Albin Michel. ISBN 9782226312785. OCLC 908438581.
