= Sir James Morgan, 4th Baronet =

Sir James Morgan, 4th Baronet of Llantarnam (1643 – 30 April 1718) was the younger son of Sir Edward Morgan, 1st Baronet.

Morgan was born at Llantarnam Abbey, Llanvihangel Llantarnam, Monmouthshire, Wales. His first wife, Alice (or Anne), was the daughter of a Judge Hopton and the widow of Nicholas Jones.

Upon the death of his nephew, Sir Edward, Morgan inherited the baronetcy but not his nephew's estate. His nephew considered him "a violent zealot" for the Church of Rome and was careful to prevent Morgan's succeeding to the estate; it went to Sir Edward's daughter Frances (Morgan) Bray. The baronetcy became extinct on James Morgan's death, as he died without issue.

He died in Wales.

== Ancestry ==
Ancestors of Sir James Morgan, 4th Baronet

16. William Morgan of (Caerleon and) Llantarnam
8. Edward Morgan of Llantarnam and Penrice
17. Elizabeth Mansel
4. William Morgan of Llantarnam
18. Hugh Smith of Long Ashton
9. Elizabeth Smith
19. _ Beckhaw
2. Sir Edward Morgan, 1st Baronet
20. William Somerset, 3rd Earl of Worcester
10. Edward Somerset, 4th Earl of Worcester
21. Christiana North
5. Lady Frances Somerset
22. Francis Hastings, 2nd Earl of Huntingdon
11. Elizabeth Hastings, Countess of Worcester
23. Catherine Pole
1. Sir James Morgan, 4th Baronet
24. Sir Thomas Englefield of Englefield
12. John Englefield of Wootton Bassett
25. Elizabeth Throckmorton
6. Sir Francis Englefield, 1st Baronet
26. Sir Edward Fitton of Gawsworth
13. Margaret Fitton
27. Mary Harbottle
3. Dorothy Englefield
28. Anthony Browne, 1st Viscount Montagu
14. Anthony Browne
29. Jane Radcliffe, Viscountess Montague
7. Jane Browne
30. Sir William Dormer of Eythrope and Wing (and Ascott)
15. Mary Dormer
31. Mary Sidney

Baronetage of England
Preceded by Edward Morgan	Baronet (of Llantarnam); 1682–1718	Extinct
