= Queen Anne Revival architecture in the United Kingdom =

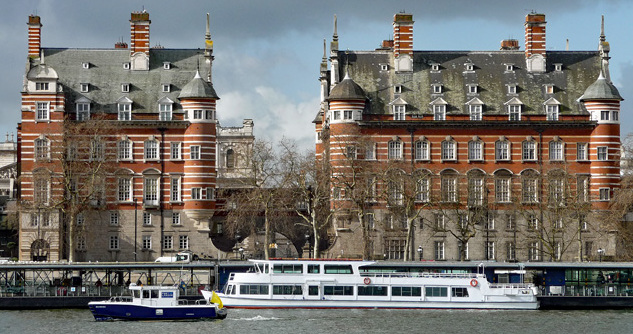
Norman Shaw Buildings, Victoria Embankment, Westminster. North Building, 1887 (right); South Building, 1902 (left)

British Queen Anne Revival architecture, also known as Domestic Revival, is a style of building using red brick, white woodwork, and an eclectic mixture of decorative features, that became popular in the 1870s, both for houses and for larger buildings such as offices, hotels, and town halls. It was popularised by Norman Shaw (1831–1912) and George Devey (1820–1886). It supposedly revives the original style of Queen Anne architecture, though this is often far from the case.

== Beginnings ==
The Queen Anne Revival was to a large extent anticipated by George Frederick Bodley, George Gilbert Scott, Norman Shaw, W. Eden Nesfield, J. J. Stevenson, and Philip Webb in the 1860s; they had used and mixed together brick pediments and pilasters, fan-lights, ribbed chimneys, Flemish or plain gables, hipped roofs, wrought-iron railings, sash windows, outside shutters, asymmetry and even sunflower decorations.

== Features ==
The Queen Anne Revival style has, as the architectural historian Mark Girouard writes,

comparatively little to do with Queen Anne. It was the nickname applied to a style which became enormously popular in the 1870s and survived into the early years of this century. 'Queen Anne' came with red brick and white-painted sash windows, with curly pedimented gables and delicate brick panels of sunflowers, swags, or cherubs, with small window panes, steep roofs, and curving bay windows, with wooden balconies and little fancy oriels jutting out where one would least expect them. It was a kind of architectural cocktail, with a little genuine Queen Anne in it, a little Dutch, a little Flemish, a squeeze of Robert Adam, a generous dash of Wren, and a touch of François 1^{er}."

All of these features can be seen in houses, large or small, of the later part of the Victorian era.

Some of the style's decorative features, visible in Bedford Park

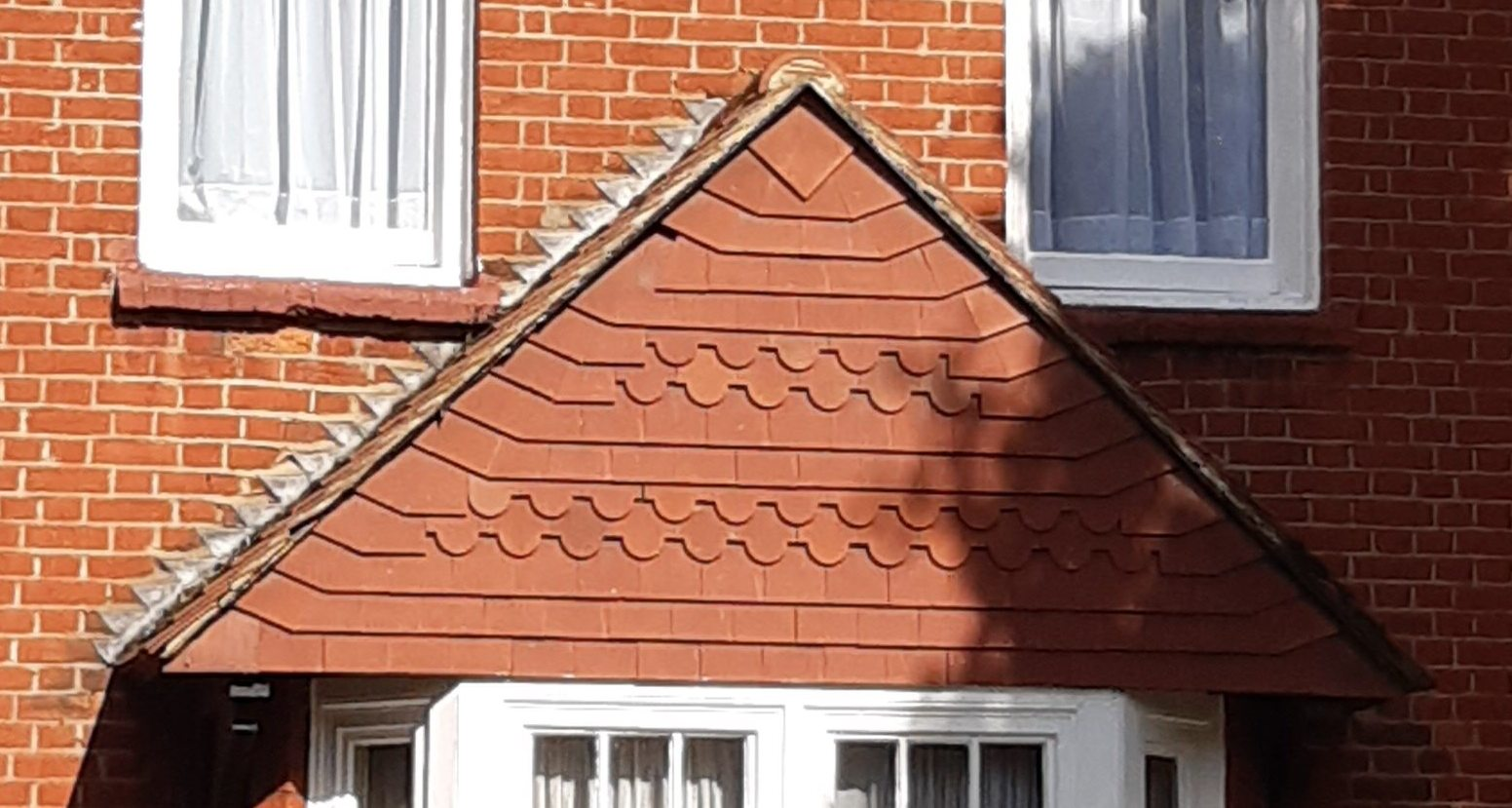
Red brick and tile-hung detail, "a little genuine Queen Anne"

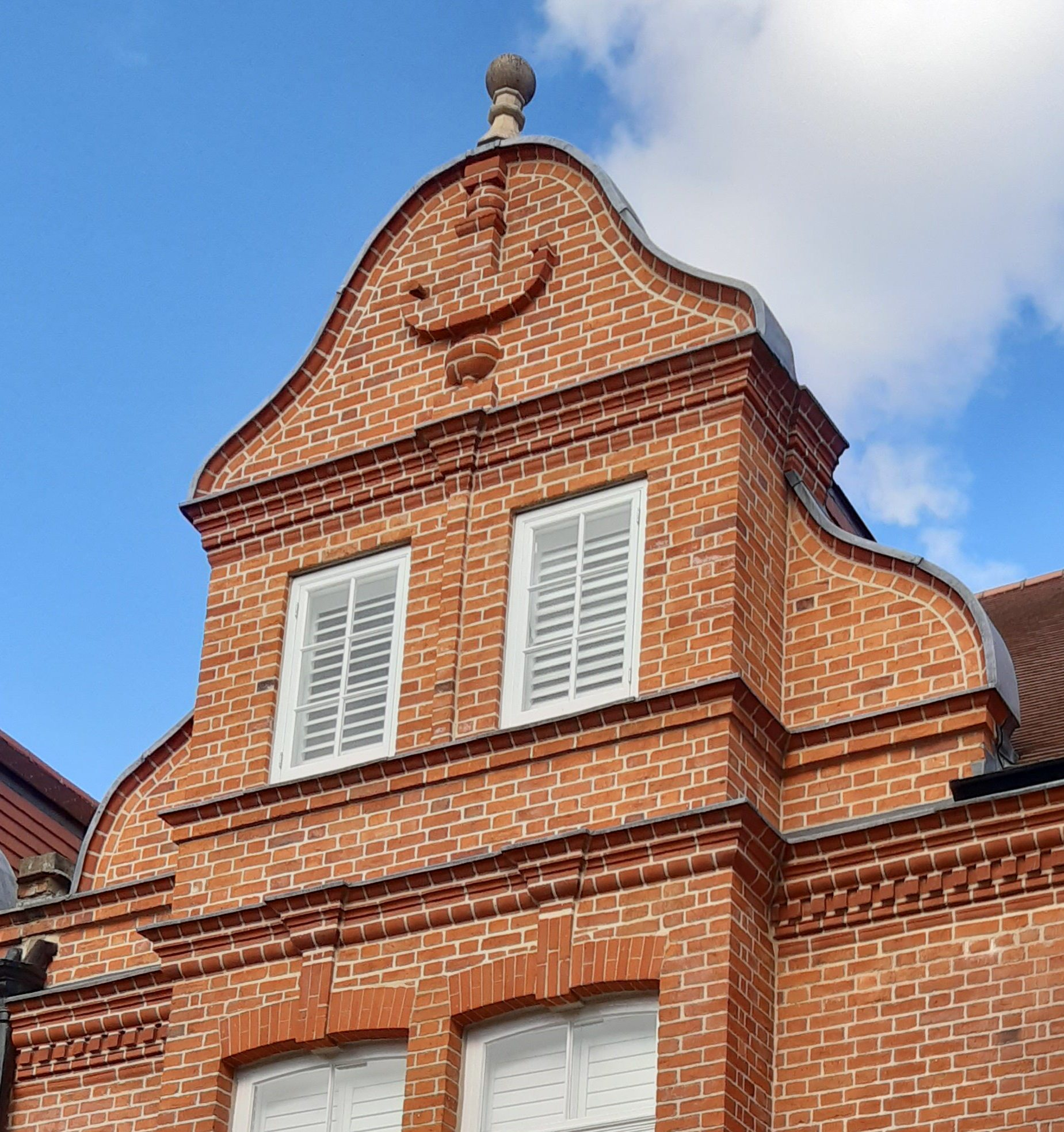
"curly pedimented gables
... a little Dutch"

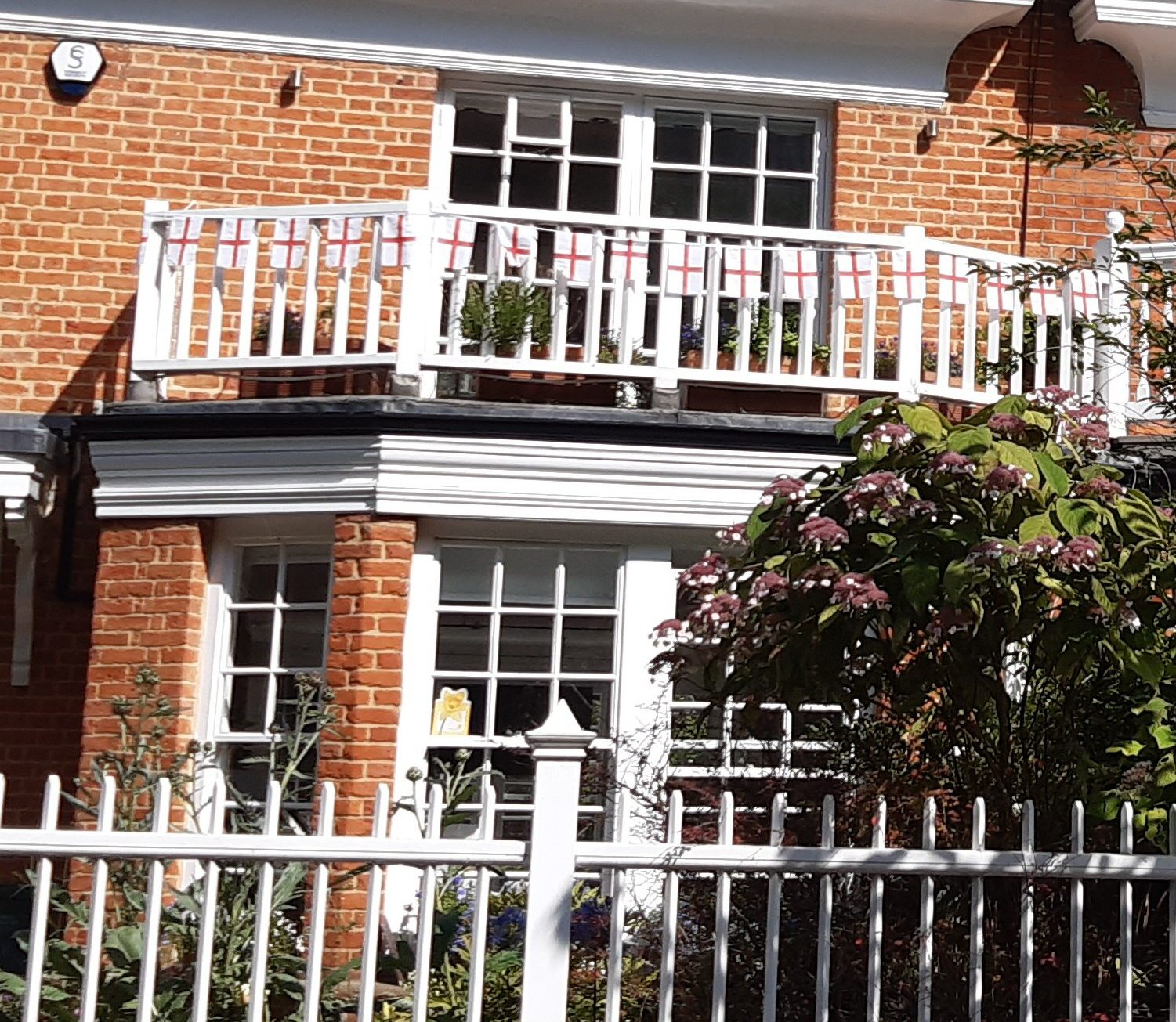
"small window panes, ... bay windows, wooden balconies"

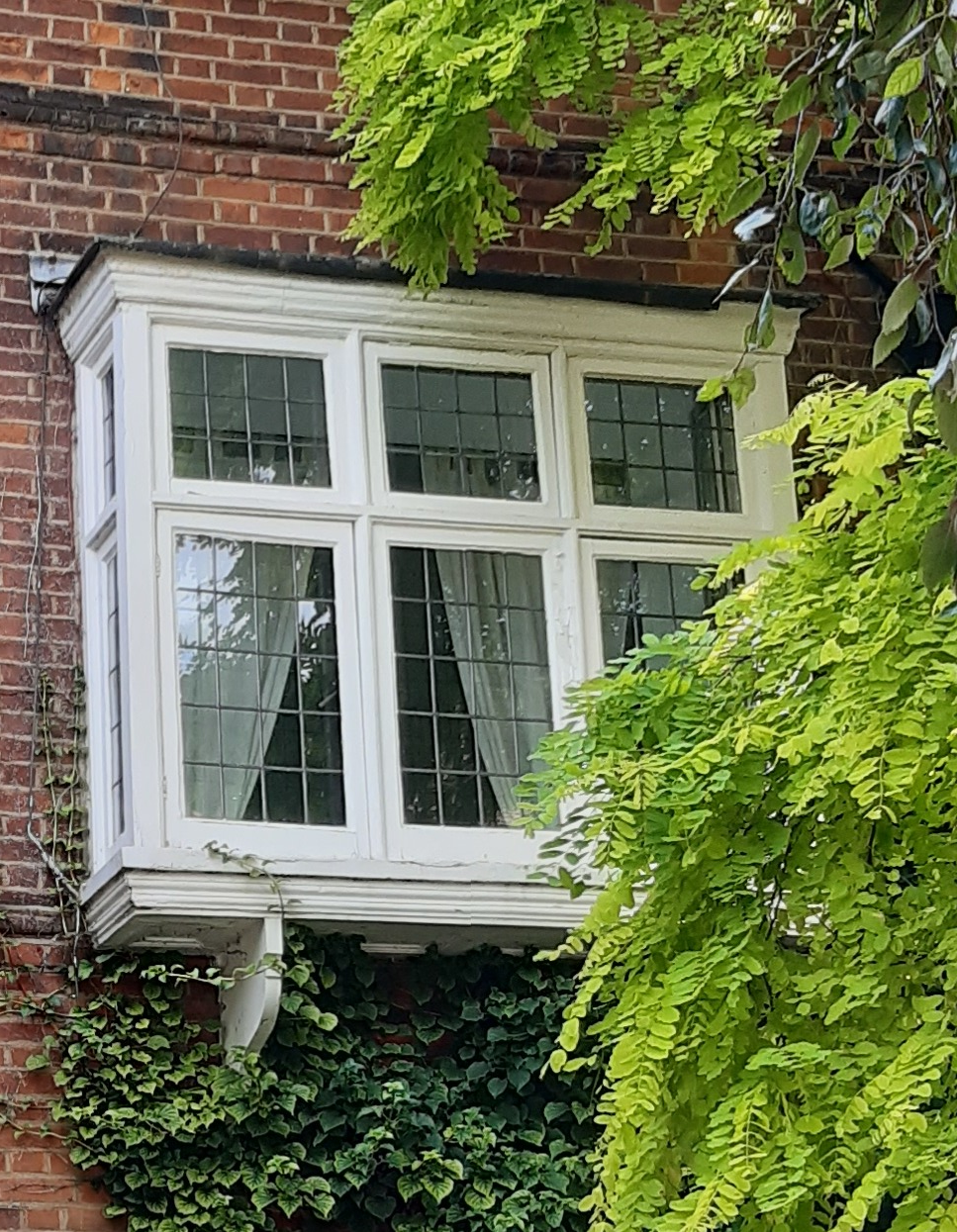
"little fancy oriels"

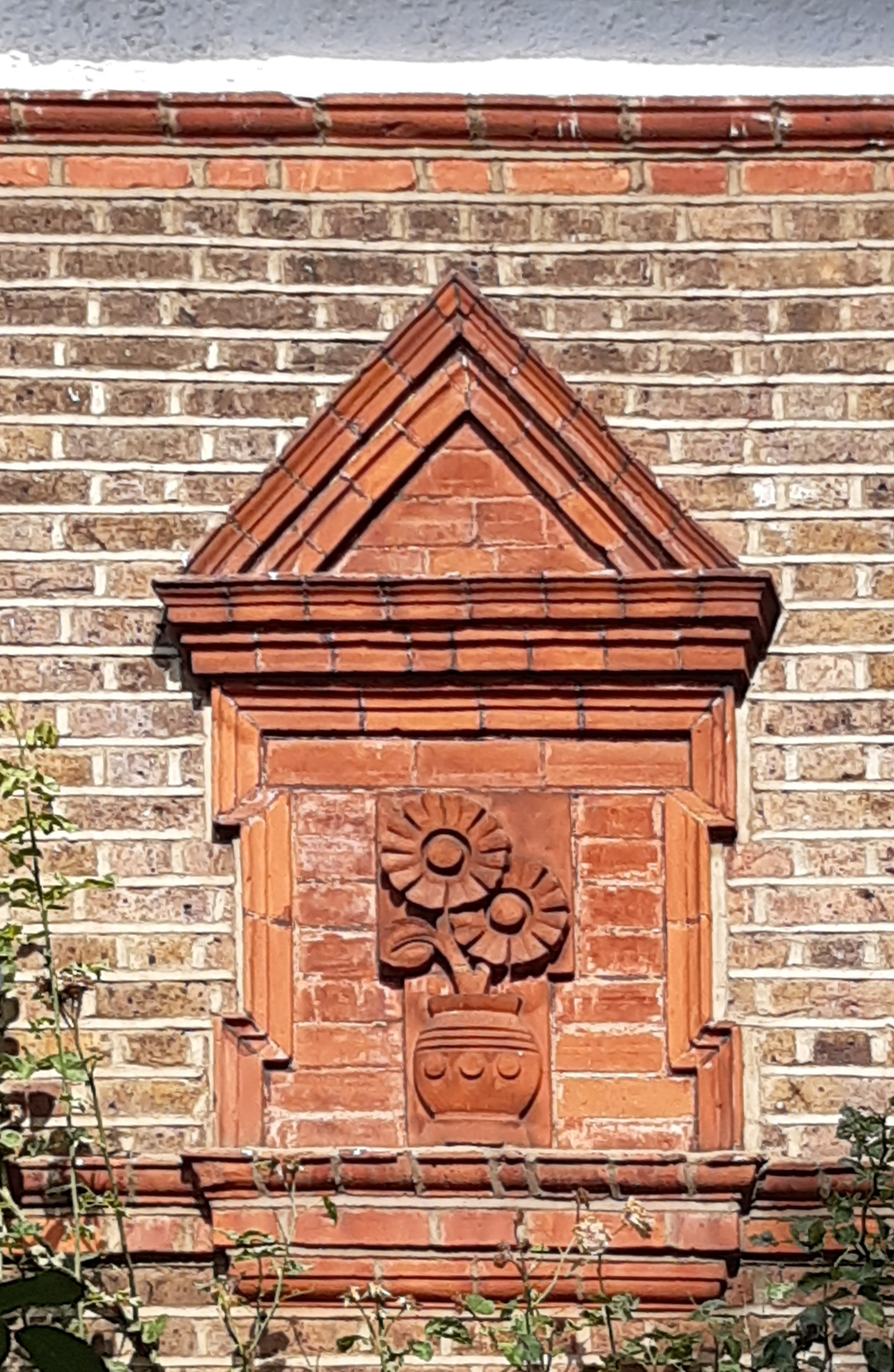
"delicate brick panels of sunflowers"

== Architects ==
=== Norman Shaw ===
Characteristic features of Shaw's houses, well seen in the Bedford Park garden suburb in west London alongside the work of other contemporary architects interpreting the Queen Anne Revival style, are red brick, walls hung with tiles, gables of varying shapes, balconies, bay windows, terracotta and rubbed brick decorations, pediments, elaborate chimneys, and balustrades painted white.

Shaw's eclectic designs freely combined Arts & Crafts, Georgian, medieval, Tudor, and Wren styles.

Norman Shaw

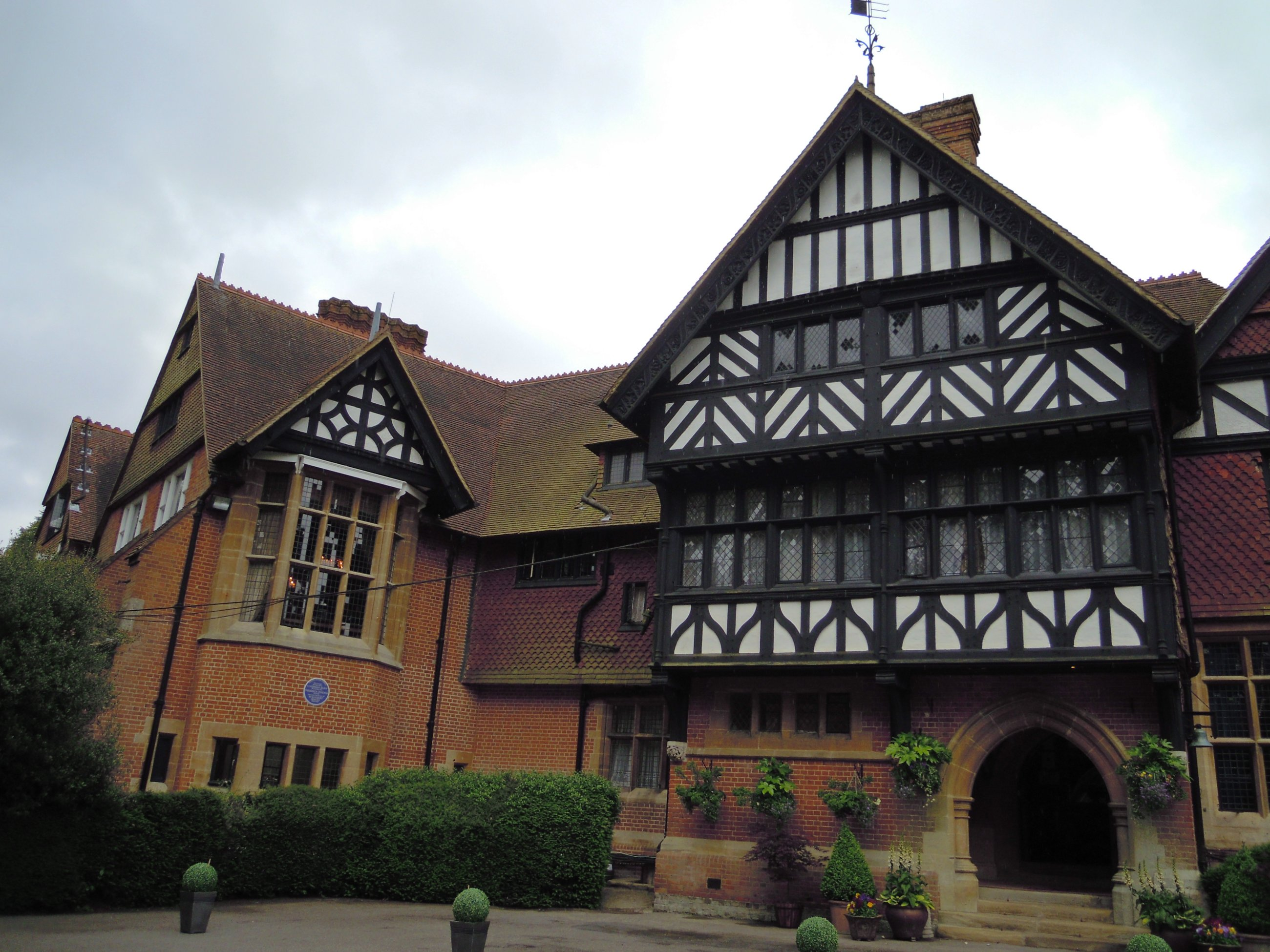
Grim's Dyke, Harrow Weald, 1870–2

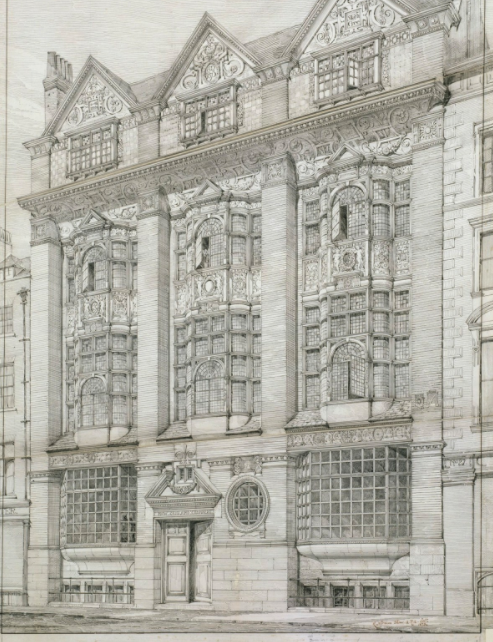
Norman Shaw's design for New Zealand Chambers, Leadenhall Street, 1873

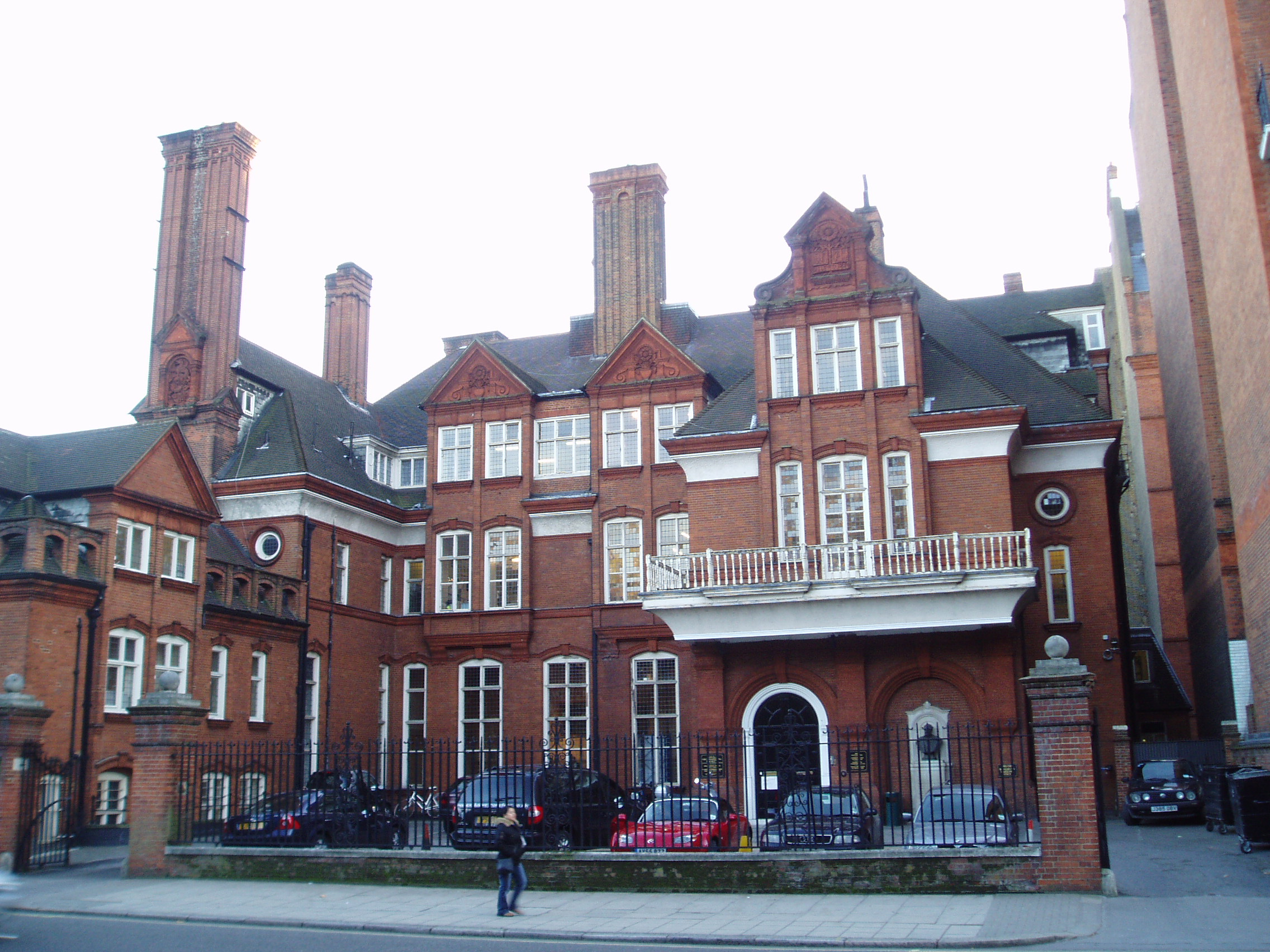
Lowther Lodge, Kensington Gore, now Royal Geographical Society, 1873-5

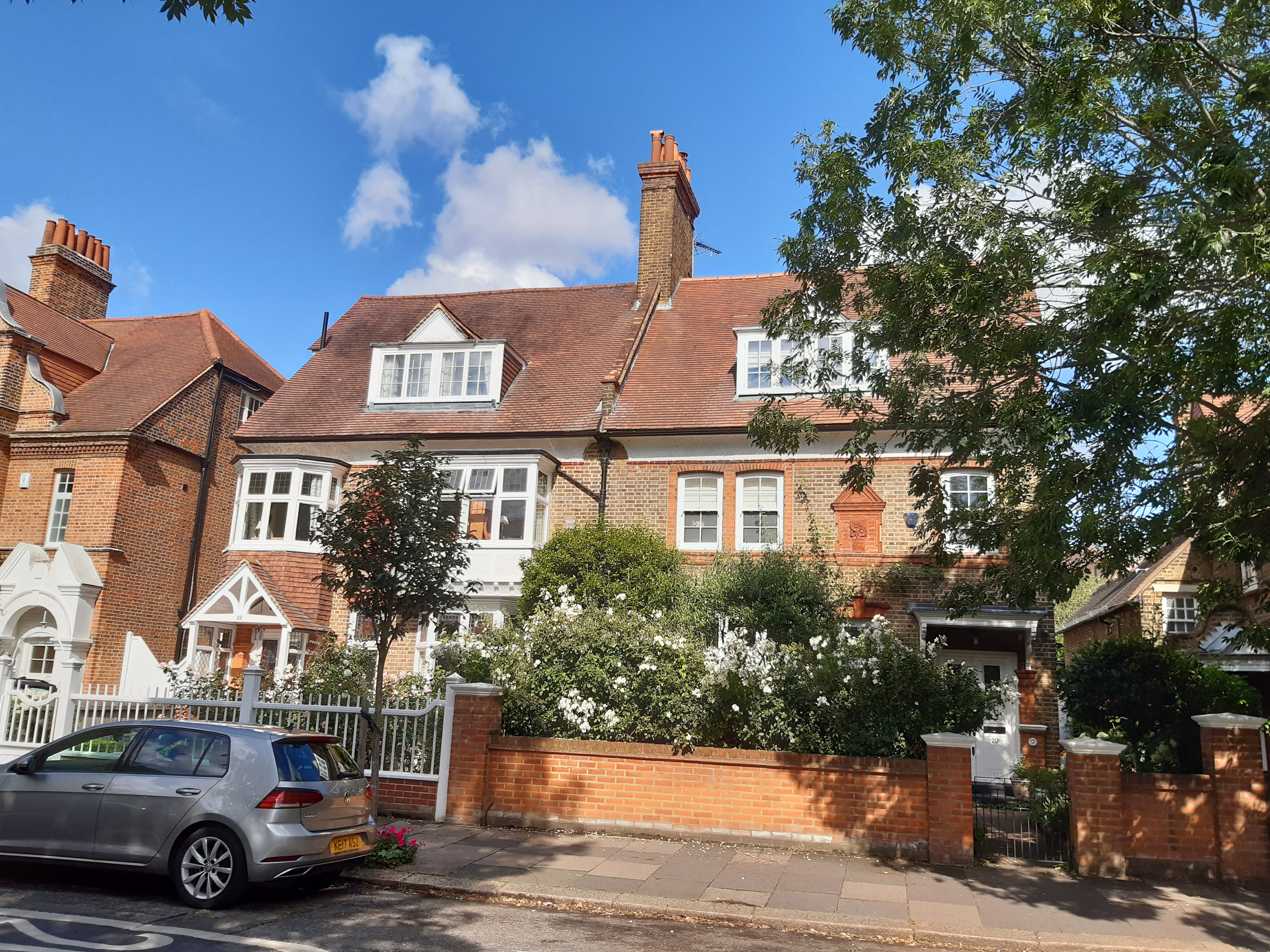
Semi-detached houses, Bedford Park, 1878

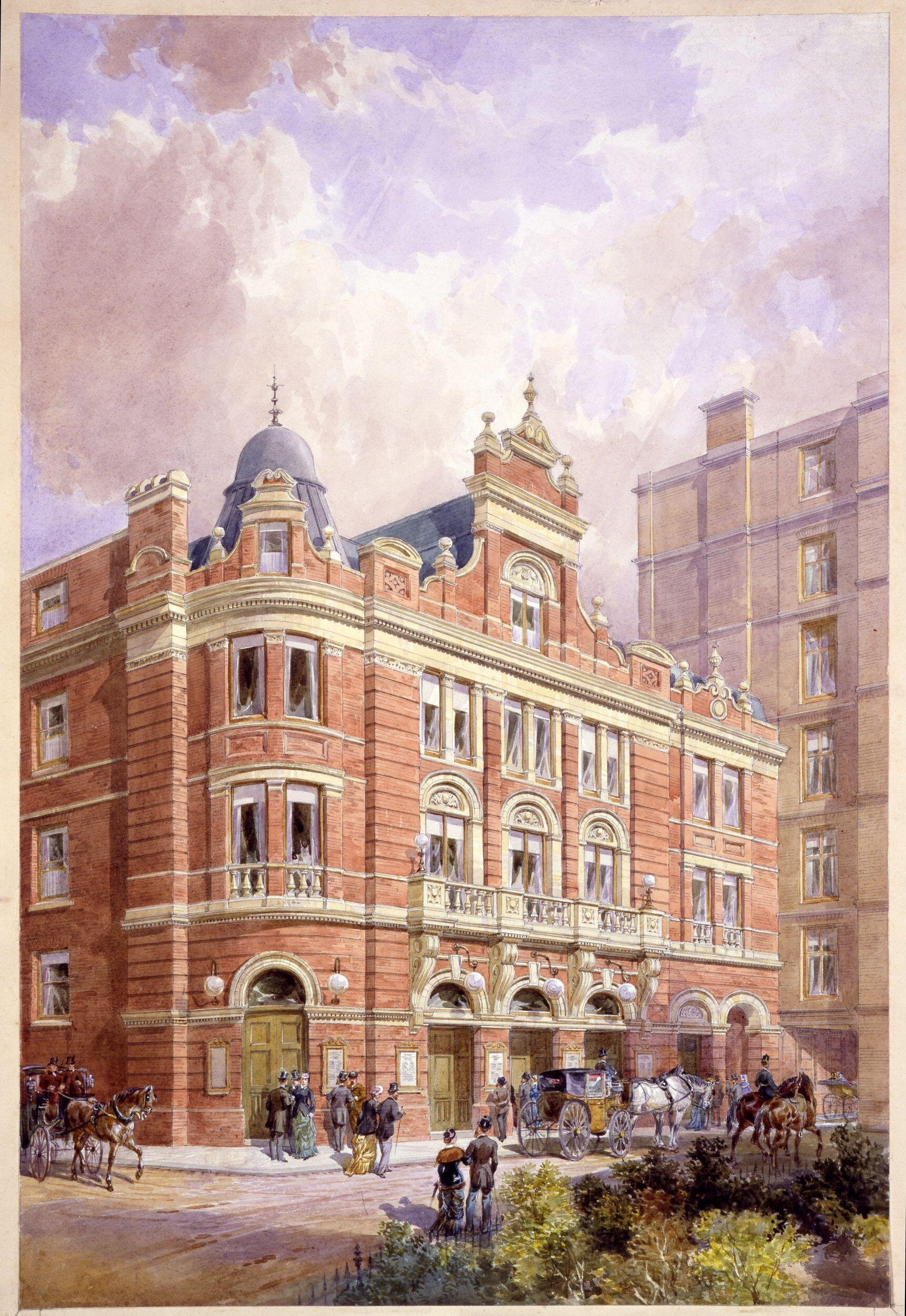
Savoy Theatre, 1881

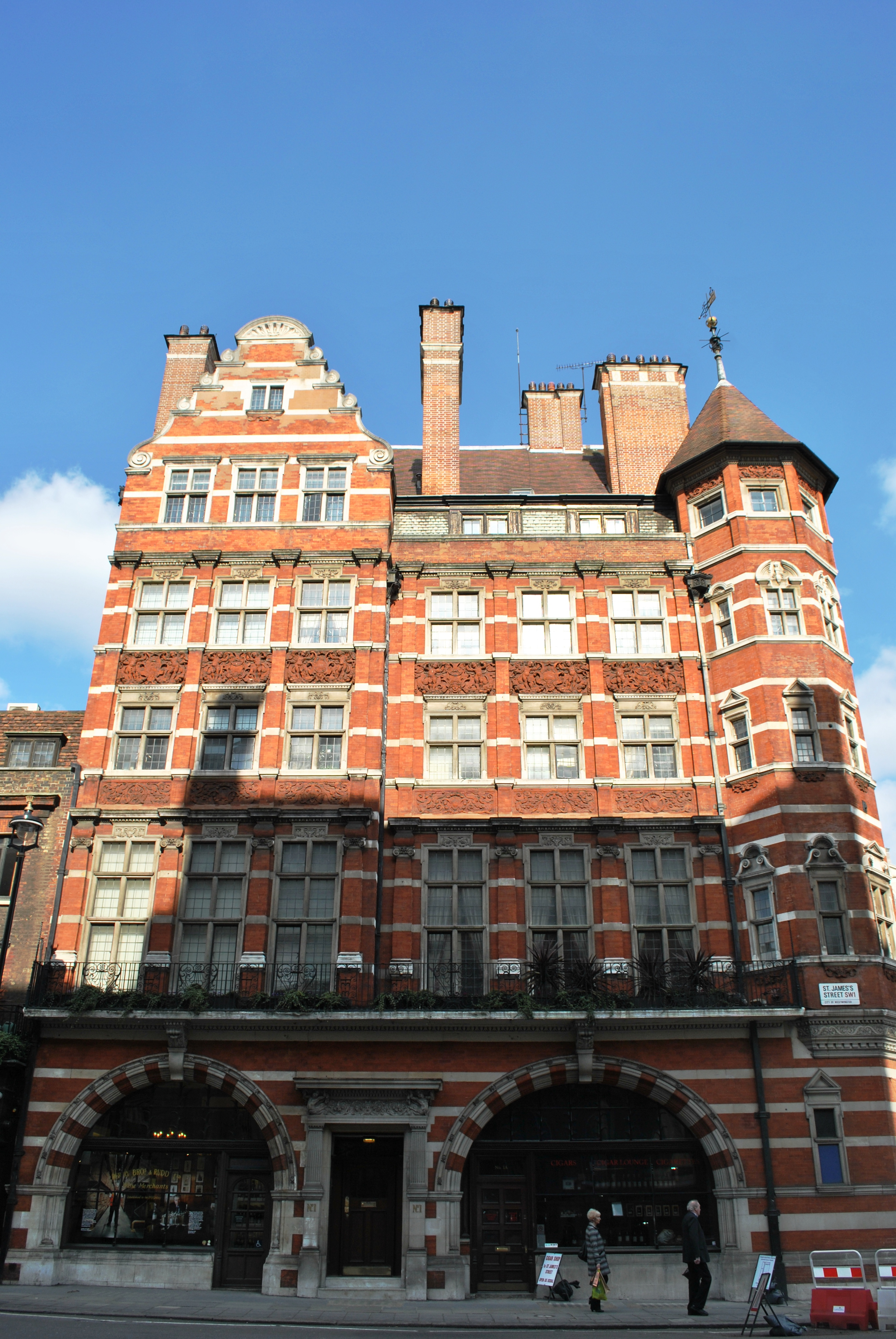
Allianz Assurance Building, St. James's Street, 1882–3

=== J. J. Stevenson ===
In 1871–3, the Scottish architect J. J. Stevenson built his widely-imitated Red House on Bayswater Hill; its name may have been a response to William Morris's Red House, Bexleyheath. Both inside and out it was an eclectic mix of styles, with furnishings from different continents and centuries. Outside it was brown brick with red brick dressings; dormer windows with Flemish gables in a flat facade over a cornice; bay windows, and sashes with louvred shutters.

J. J. Stevenson

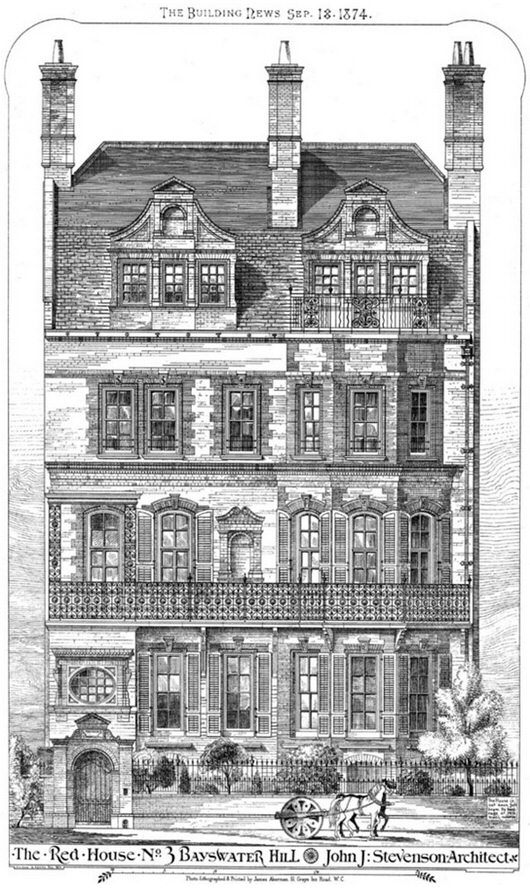
The Red House, Bayswater, J. J. Stevenson, 1874

=== W. E. Nesfield ===
W. E. Nesfield worked in partnership with Shaw from 1866 to 1869, helping to develop the Queen Anne Revival style. Together they examined the architecture of the English countryside, sketching Kent and Sussex's half-timbered farmhouses and tile-hung cottages, and then the structure and ornamentation of houses in country towns, with their red brick, sash windows, plasterwork, pargetting, joinery and rubbed or shaped brick. From this and a measure of George Edmund Street's Gothic Revival, they made their "Old English" style. Gradually adding in their exploration of 17th and 18th century classic architecture, they developed their Queen Anne Revival style.

W. E. Nesfield

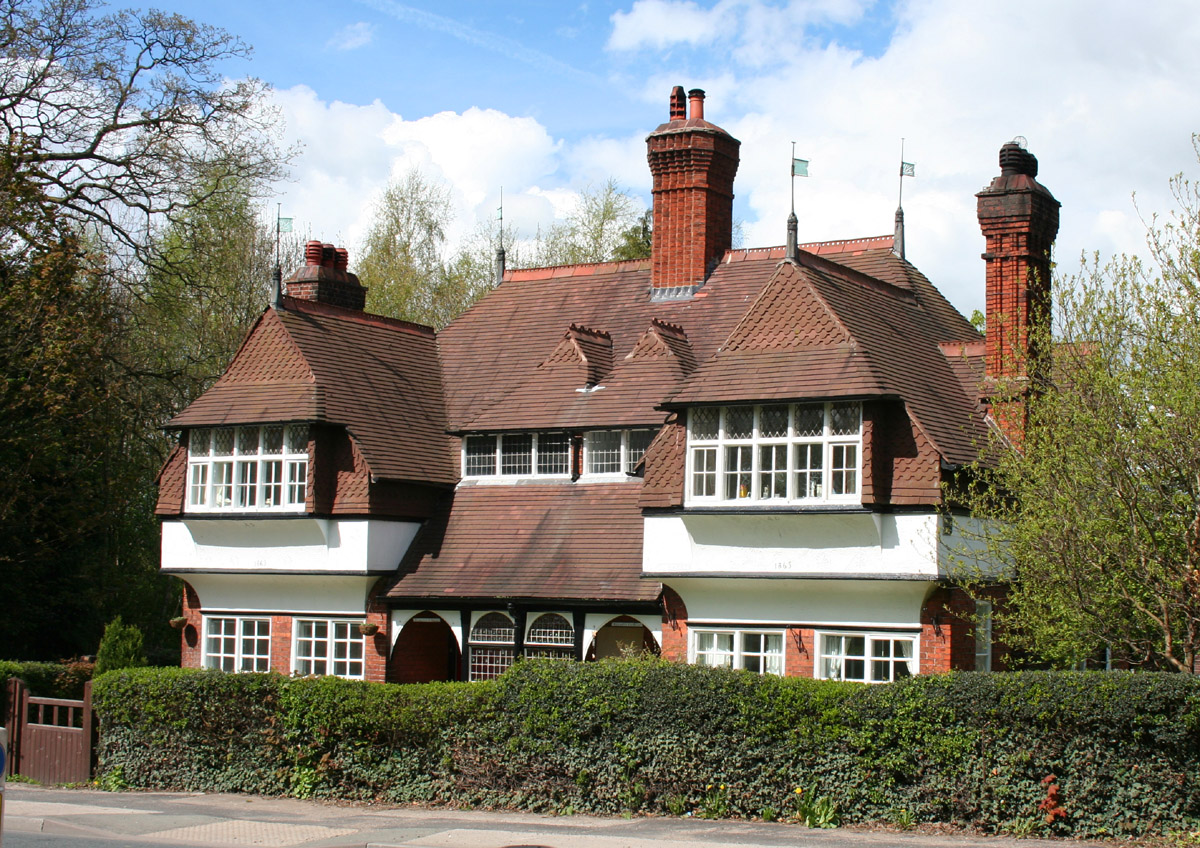
Cottages at Stowford, near Crewe. W. E. Nesfield, 1865

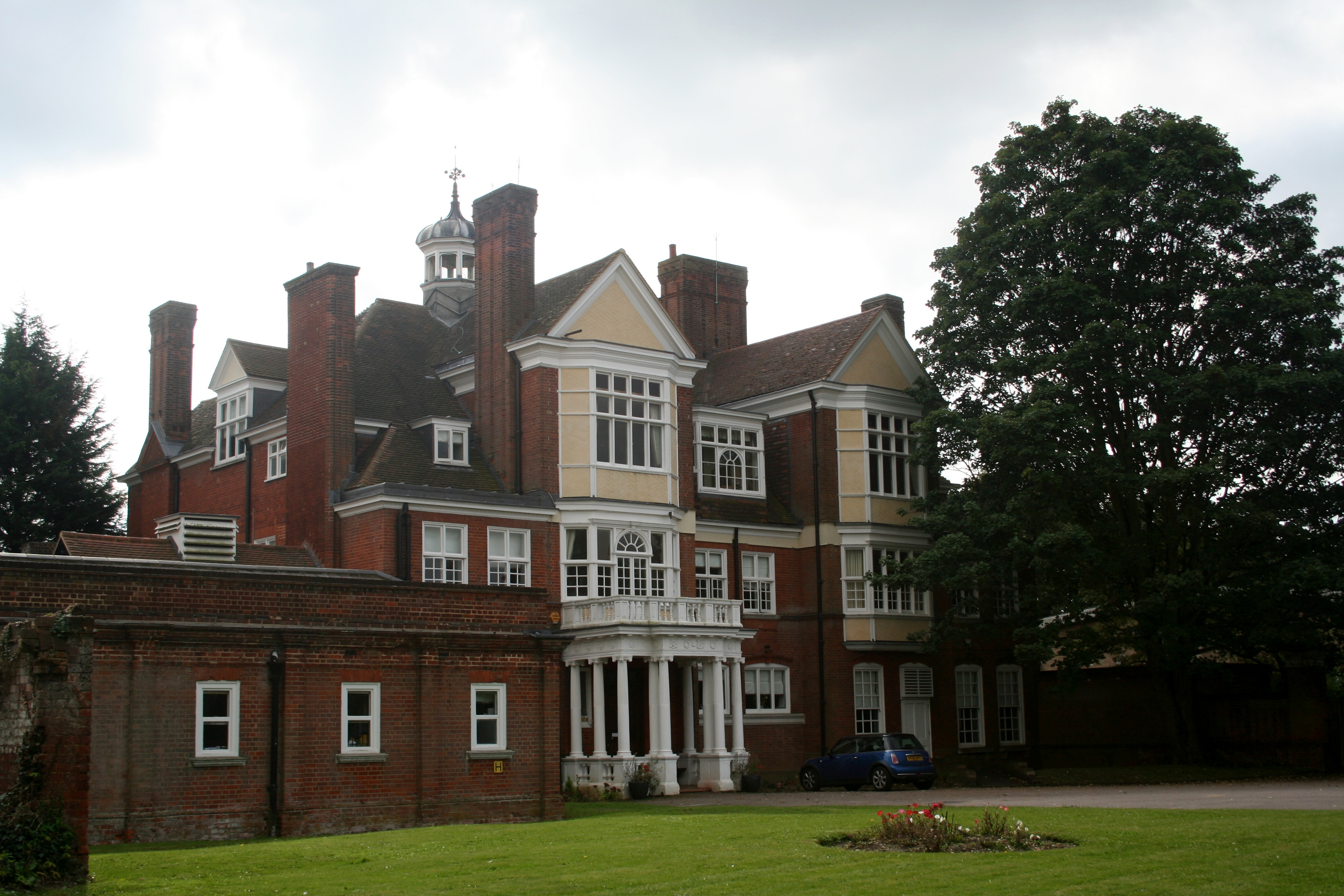
Loughton Hall, 1878

=== Other architects ===
Queen Anne Revival houses by diverse architects

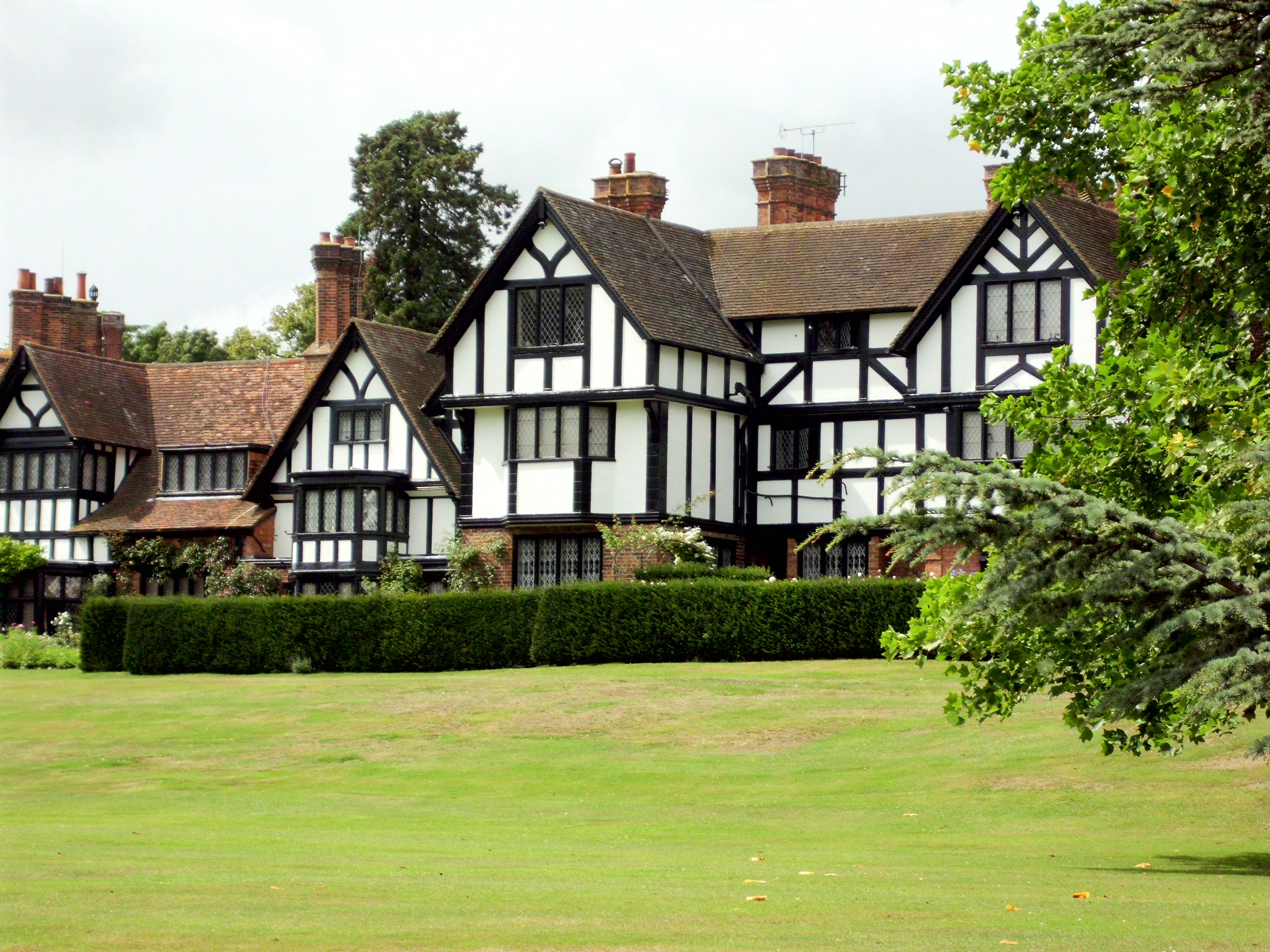
Ascott House, Aylesbury Vale. George Devey, 1874

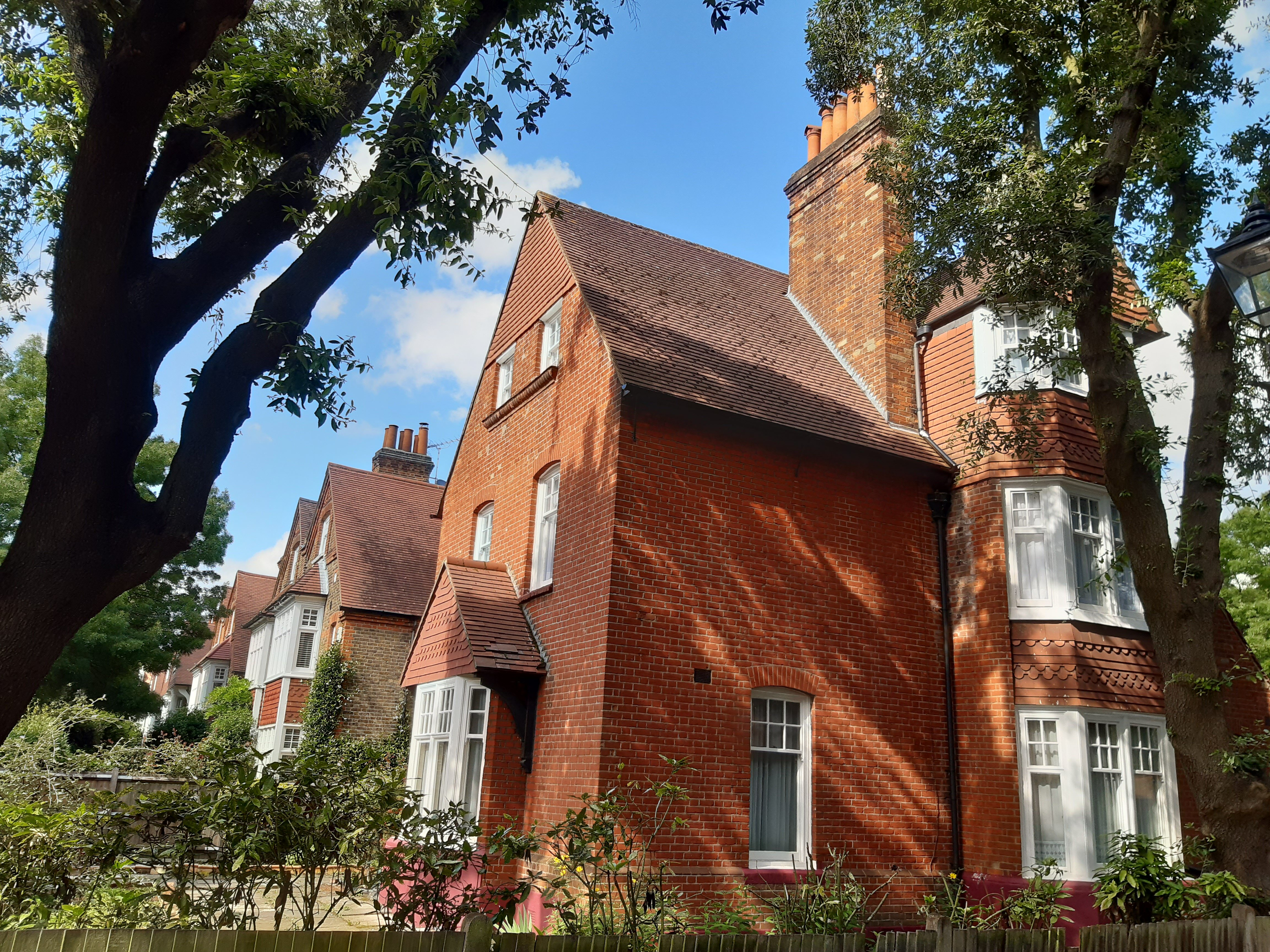
Detached house, Bedford Park, London. E. W. Godwin, 1876

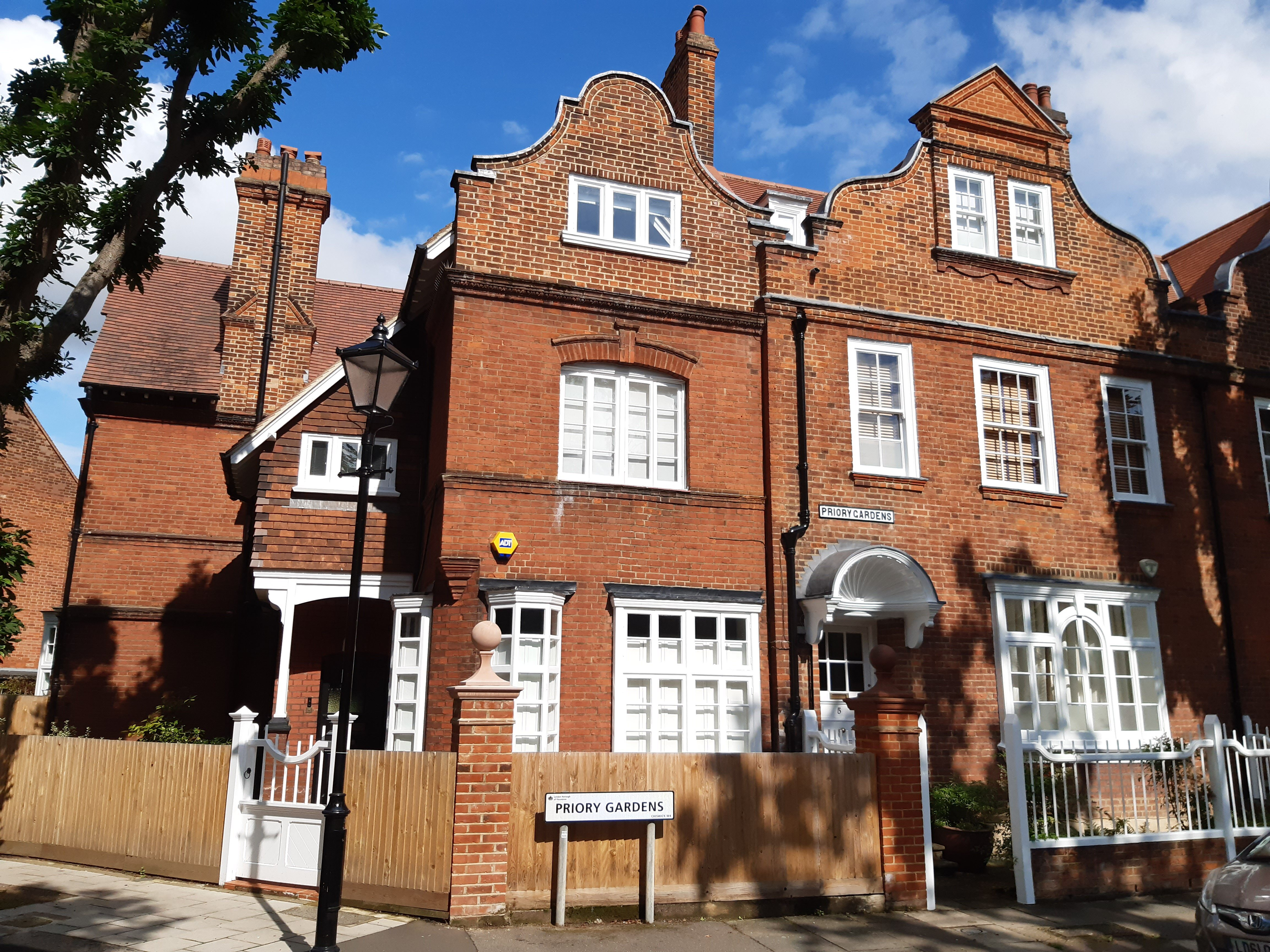
Red brick terrace, Bedford Park. Edward John May, 1880

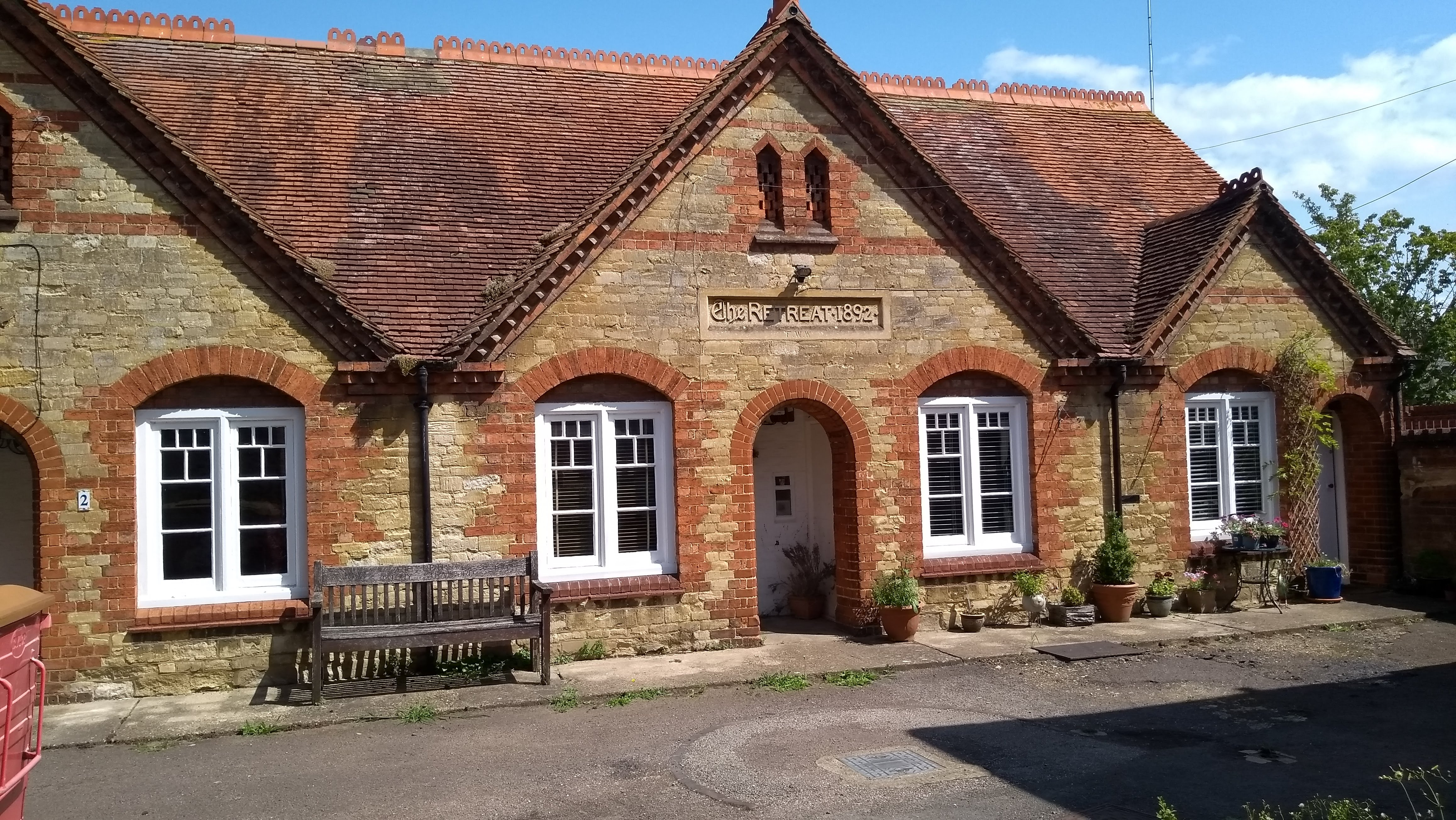
Limestone and brick almshouses in Stony Stratford, Milton Keynes. Swinfen Harris, 1892

== Developments ==
New World Queen Anne Revival architecture and its derivative the Shingle style are related to the British Queen Anne style but with time became increasingly different from it, and in Girouard's view are "both more adventurous and more exciting."

== Reception ==
=== Professional ===
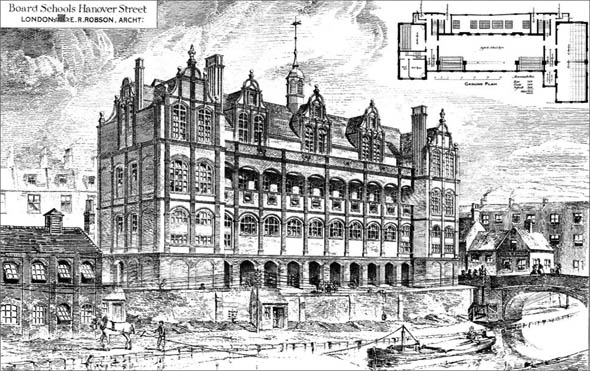
Edward Robert Robson's design for the Board Schools, Hanover Street, London had a mixed reception.

Professional criticism of the style began quickly, with comments such as that in the Building News of 31 May 1872, likely by the church architect J. P. Seddon, that it was "mediaeval, but freely treated, with a good deal of impure classical details, introduced after the fashion of the Queen Anne period, now so much and so foolishly imitated". Other Gothic Revival architects followed suit, though the younger ones were more accepting; E. W. Godwin remarked on the "excellence both of the materials and workmanship" of J. J. Stevenson's Red House. When in 1873 the Royal Academy showed off the designs for George Frederick Bodley's School Board Offices, Edward Robert Robson & Stevenson's Board Schools, and Shaw's New Zealand Chambers, they were found in Girouard's words "clever, no doubt, but also startling and even shocking".

=== Amateur ===
The lay press was more relaxed about the new style; The Globe of 13 January 1874 called it a natural response to the more assertive Gothic Revival, while The Saturday Review of 31 July 1875 described its own response as "perfect good humour and equal scepticism", considering the style to be artificially based on an eclectic mix and not at all serious.
