= Morgan baronets of Llantarnam (1642) =

Escutcheon of the Morgan baronets of Llantarnam

The Morgan baronetcy, of Llantarnam in the County of Monmouth, was created in the Baronetage of England on 12 May 1642 for Edward Morgan, a Royalist and High Sheriff of Monmouthshire in 1640–1.

The 3rd Baronet sat as Member of Parliament for Monmouthshire. The title became extinct on the death of the 4th Baronet in 1728.

== Morgan baronets, of Llantarnam (1642) ==
- Sir Edward Morgan, 1st Baronet (c. 1604–1653)
- Sir Edward Morgan, 2nd Baronet (died c. 1675)
- Sir Edward Morgan, 3rd Baronet (died 1682)
- Sir James Morgan, 4th Baronet (died 1728)
