= Aston Clinton House =

Former mansion in Buckinghamshire, England

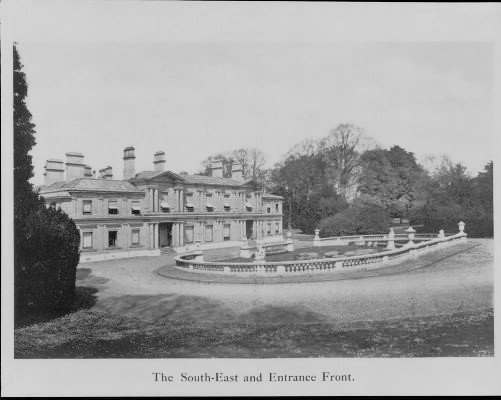
- Aston Clinton House probably late 19th century
- Coordinates: 51°47′42″N 0°42′58″W
- Demolished: between 1956 and 1958
- Architect: George Henry Stokes and George Myers, modernisation; George Devey, cottages and the park gates

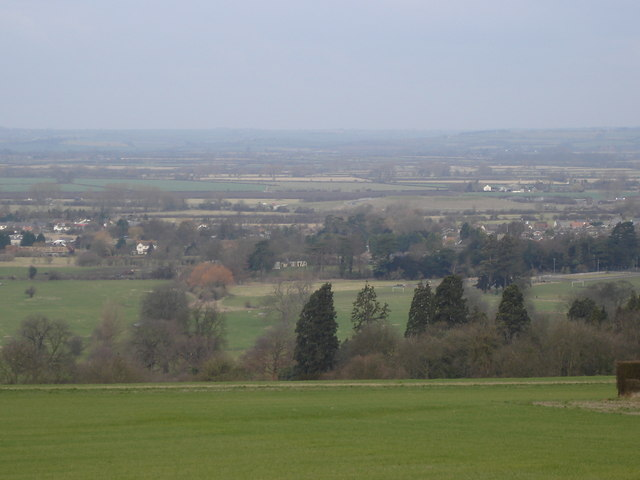
Green Park near Aston Clinton now

Aston Clinton House (also known as Green Park though referred to as simply Aston Clinton by the Rothschild family) was a large mansion to the south-east of the village of Aston Clinton in Buckinghamshire, England.

== History ==
=== Rothschild period ===
In 1851, Anthony Nathan de Rothschild bought the estate from a banker from Aylesbury. By 1853, he had completed the modernisation of Aston Clinton House and extensive estates in the area, with the help of the architect George Henry Stokes and the builder George Myers. From 1864 to 1877, the architect George Devey designed the cottages and the park gates (he later transformed another Rothschild property, Ascott House). Old photographs of the house show a sprawling neo-Georgian/Italianate house with verandahs and a large porte-cochère. Many workers' cottages were built, and two schools and a village hall set up under Rothschild patronage.

On the death of Lady Louise de Rothschild in 1910, the house was bequeathed to her two daughters, Constance, Lady Battersea and Annie, The Hon. Mrs. Eliot Yorke, who shared it as a holiday home, spending a few weeks together there each summer. They developed horticulture in the gardens which became full of rare plants. Cyril Flower, 1st Baron Battersea contributed to the development of the gardens.

In the First World War, like the adjoining Halton House and estate, Aston Clinton House was lent to the War Office, becoming in September 1914 the HQ of 21st Infantry Division. 21st Division was a "New Army" division, part of Kitchener's Army, and it was formed-up and trained on Rothschild land in Buckinghamshire, initially in Tring but in 1915 on the Halton and Aston Clinton estates. Four brigades of field artillery and one heavy battery received their advanced training in the grounds of Aston Clinton House in the spring and summer of 1915, including extensive gas offensive and defensive training. Final inspection of the division by Lord Kitchener occurred in August 1915 and the move to France took place from 2 to 13 September 1915.

In 1923, the Rothschilds sold the house to Dr Albert Edward Bredin Crawford for £15,000.

=== After 1923 ===
At the start of the Second World War the house was the Green Park Hotel, but during the War the stables were used by EKCO, an electronics company from Southend-on-Sea, Essex, as its main headquarters and for radar research and development, and the main house was used as a hospital for war wounded. It had been a boys' prep school (where Evelyn Waugh obtained his second post as a junior master in 1925)), followed by a further brief spell as a hotel. The main building was demolished between 1956 and 1958.

Buckinghamshire County Council then acquired the property with the proviso that it be used for educational purposes. Today the estate is used as a residential training centre for young people, operated by Kingswood Learning and Leisure Group. The original ornamental features of the extended garden still remain, incorporated into the site now called Green Park. All that remain of the buildings of the estate are the stables, used as part of the training centre, and the lodge in Stablebridge Road.

== See also ==
- Rothschild properties in England
- Destruction of country houses in 20th-century Britain
