= Rothschild properties in the home counties =

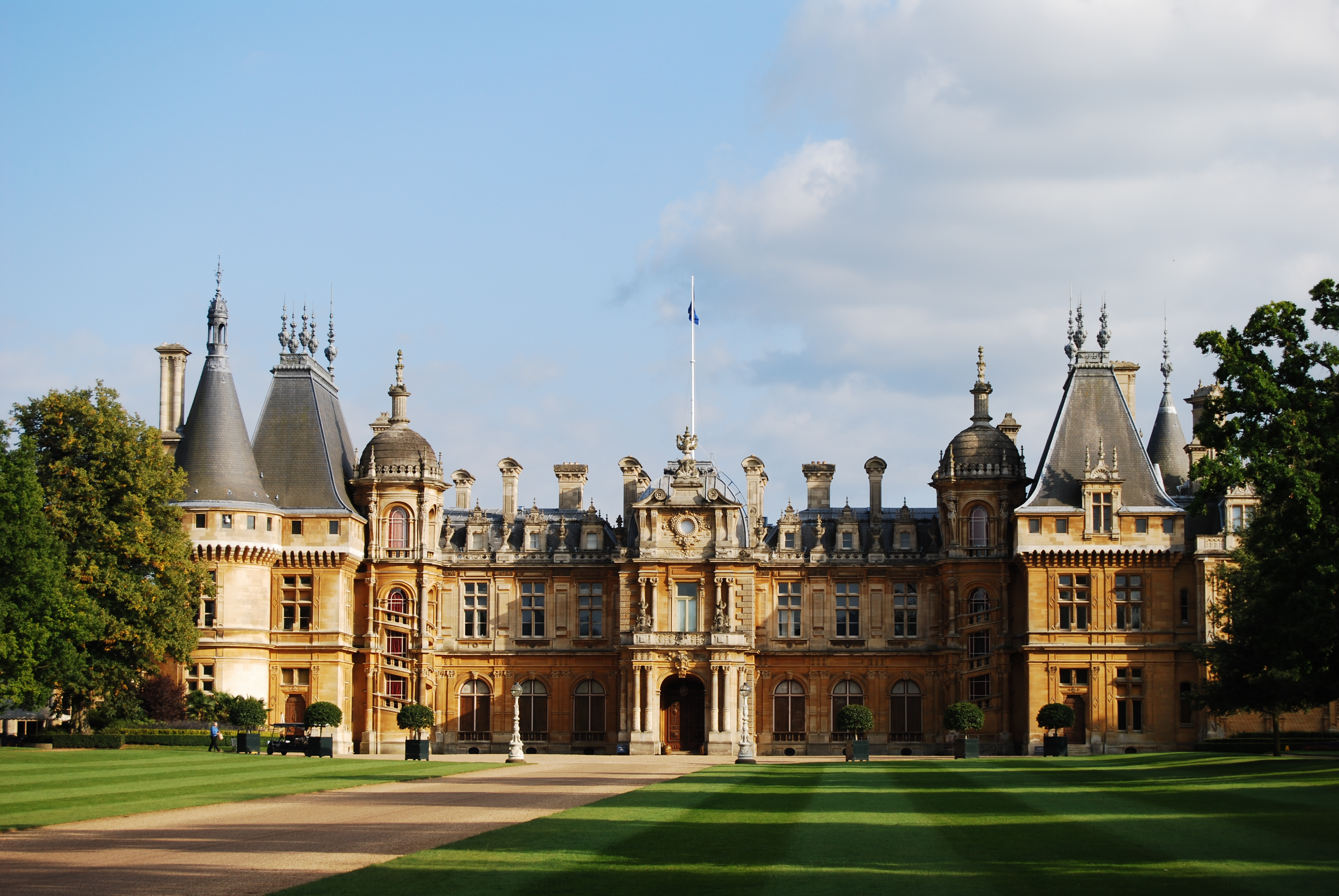
The north entrance facade of Waddesdon Manor, one of the National Trust's most visited properties.

In the 19th century members of the English Rothschild family bought and built many country houses in the home counties, furnishing them with the art the family collected. The area of the Vale of Aylesbury, where many of the houses were situated, became known as "Rothchildshire". In the 20th century, many of these properties were sold off with their art collections dispersed. Today only Eythrope House still belongs to the family, although they still retain influence in how Ascott House and Waddesdon Manor are managed. In the loss of country houses in the 20th century, only Aston Clinton was lost.

== Properties ==
The country houses that were purchased or built in or around Buckinghamshire included:

- Ascott House, Wing in the Vale of Aylesbury
- Aston Clinton House, Aston Clinton in the Vale of Aylesbury
- Champneys, Wigginton on the edge of the Chiltern Hills
- Eythrope, Buckinghamshire
- Exbury estate, Hampshire Exbury in the New Forest National Park.
- Flint House, Waddesdon, Buckinghamshire
- Gunnersbury Park, Middlesex
- Halton House, Halton
- Mentmore Towers, Mentmore
- Shorncliffe Lodge, Folkestone, Kent
- Tring Park Mansion, Tring, Hertfordshire
- Waddesdon Manor, Waddesdon, Buckinghamshire
- Windmill Hill, Buckinghamshire, Waddesdon
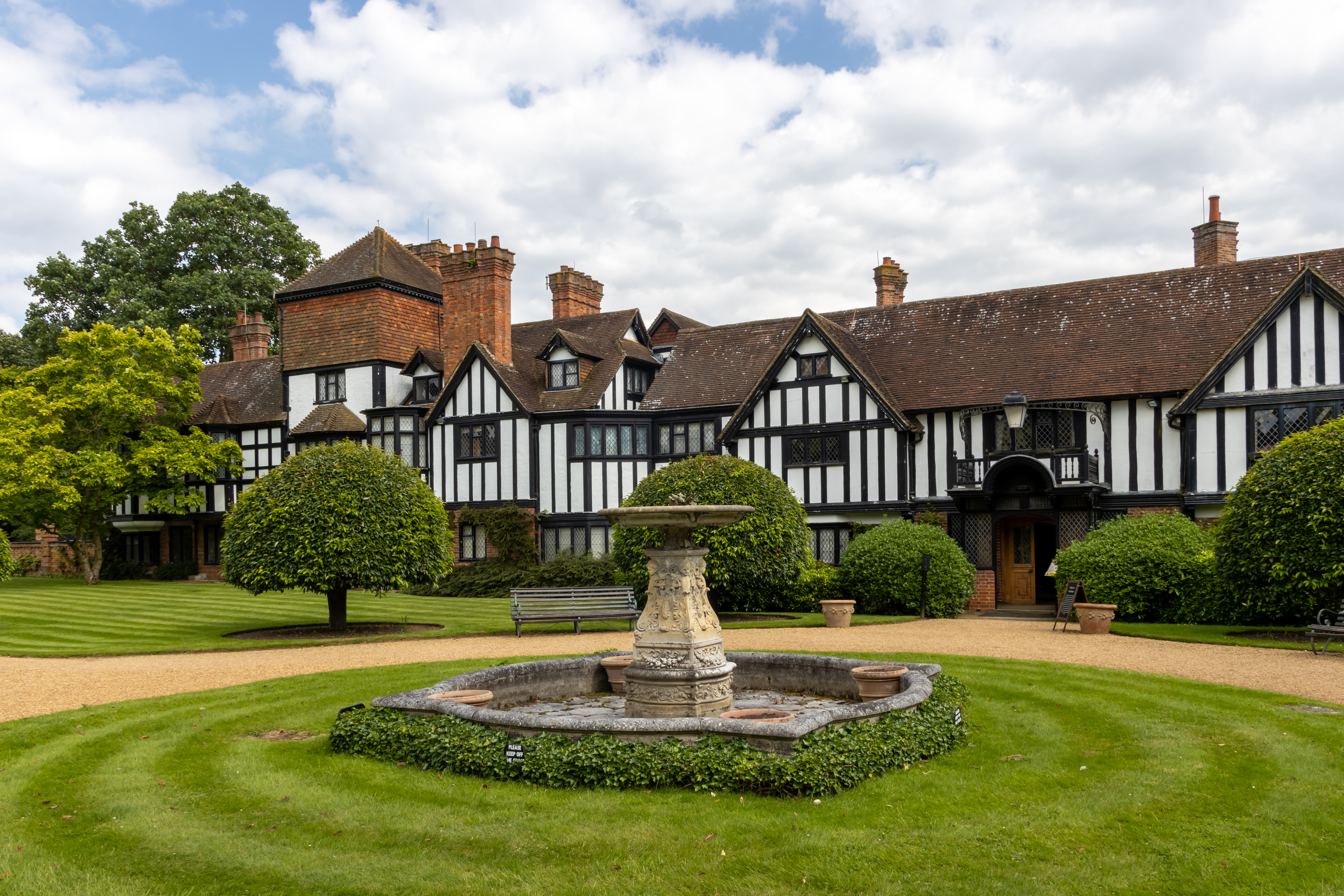
Ascott House

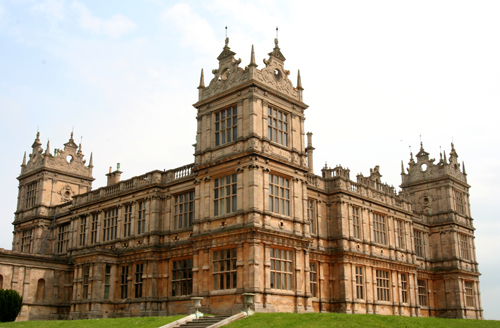
Mentmore Towers

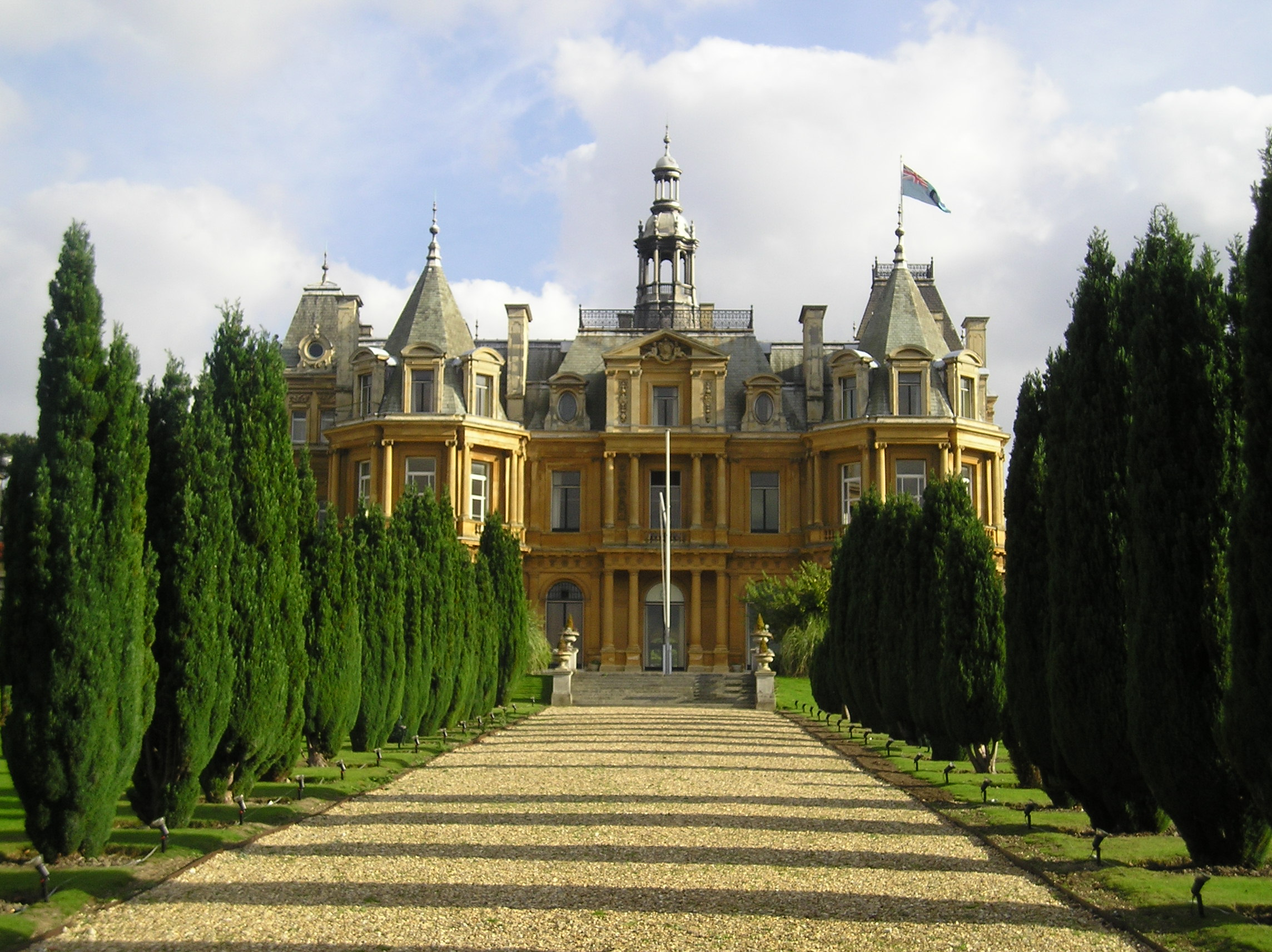
Halton House

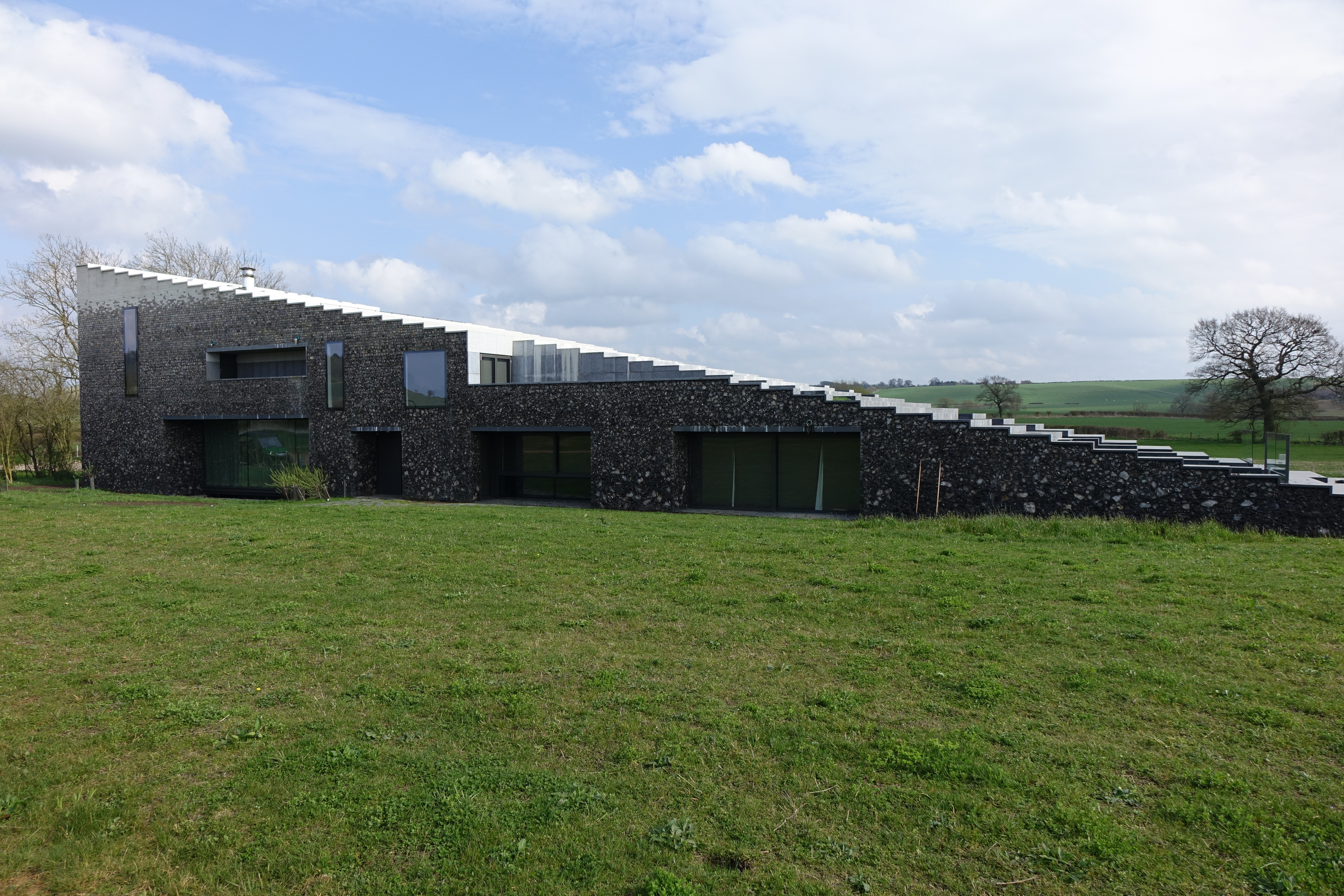
Flint House

== History ==
Nathan Mayer Rothschild had rented Tring Park in Tring, Hertfordshire in the 1830s. It was purchased with 4,000 acres (16 km^{2}) by Lionel Rothschild in May 1872 as his principal country residence. Waddesdon Manor, near to the market town of Aylesbury, was built in the 1870s, Further afield, the Rothschild family owned the Exbury estate in Hampshire, known for the Rothschild collection of rhododendrons, azaleas and camellias, now run by a charity.

== See also ==
- George Devey
