= Ascott, Buckinghamshire =

Hamlet in Buckinghamshire, England

Coordinates: 51.897656°N 0.705329°W

Ascott
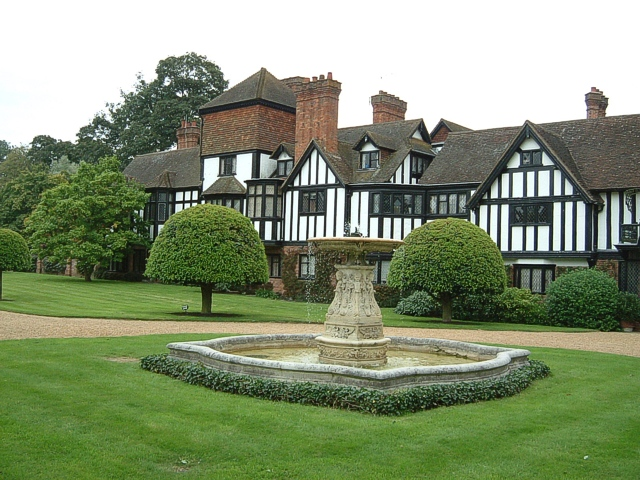
- Ascott House

- Location within Buckinghamshire
- OS grid reference: SP8922
- Civil parish: Wing
- Unitary authority: Buckinghamshire
- Ceremonial county: Buckinghamshire
- Region: South East
- Country: England
- Sovereign state: United Kingdom
- Post town: LEIGHTON BUZZARD
- Postcode district: LU7
- Dialling code: 01525
- Police: Thames Valley
- Fire: Buckinghamshire
- Ambulance: South Central
- UK Parliament: Aylesbury

Ascott is a hamlet and country house in the parish of Wing, Buckinghamshire, England. The hamlet lies completely within the boundary of the Ascott Estate; it is home to many of the estate and house staff.

Prior to the Norman Conquest there was an abbey at Ascott, that had been given by a royal to a Benedictine convent in Angiers. In 1415 however, the same year as the Battle of Agincourt, the convent was seized by the English church because it belonged to the French and awarded to the Convent of St Mary du Pre, near St Albans.

In the early 16th century the abbey (along with the manor of Wing) was seized by the Crown and given to Cardinal Wolsey, however not long after it was seized once again in the Dissolution of the Monasteries and given to Robert Dormer. In 1554 William Dormer entertained Princess Elizabeth at the house, when she was on the road to London under arrest as a Protestant because her sister Mary had just taken the throne. Anne of Denmark visited in 1612, and James VI and I was entertained at Ascott by Anne, Lady Dormer, in 1620.

The former abbey, now a house, once featured additions that were attributed to Inigo Jones. The house fell into decay following the death without heirs of Charles Dormer, 2nd Earl of Carnarvon in 1709. In 1727 the house and estate were broken up, the deer sold and all the timber cut down and sold off. In the late 19th century members of the Rothschild banking family began to acquire estates in the area, including Ascott. In 1873 a farm house in the parish known as Ascott Hall was bought by Baron Mayer de Rothschild he gave it to his nephew Leopold de Rothschild who employed the architect George Devey to enlarge the property into a substantial country house. Today this is the National Trust property known as Ascott House or sometimes known more simply as just "Ascott".
