= Morgan baronets =

Set index for Morgan baronets

There have been five baronetcies for persons with the surname Morgan, two in the Baronetage of England, one in the Baronetage of Great Britain and two in the Baronetage of the United Kingdom. All five creations are extinct.

- Morgan baronets of Llantarnam (1642)
- Morgan baronets of Langattock (1661)
- Gould, later Morgan baronets of Tredegar (1792): see Baron Tredegar
- Morgan baronets of Green Street and Lincoln's Inn (1892): see Sir George Osborne Morgan, 1st Baronet (1826–1897)
- Morgan baronets of Whitehall Court (1906): see Sir Walter Morgan, 1st Baronet (1831–1916)

== See also ==
- Vaughan-Morgan baronets
- Hughes-Morgan baronets
