= Llantarnam Abbey =

House in Llantarnam, Torfaen, site of a former 12th-century monastery

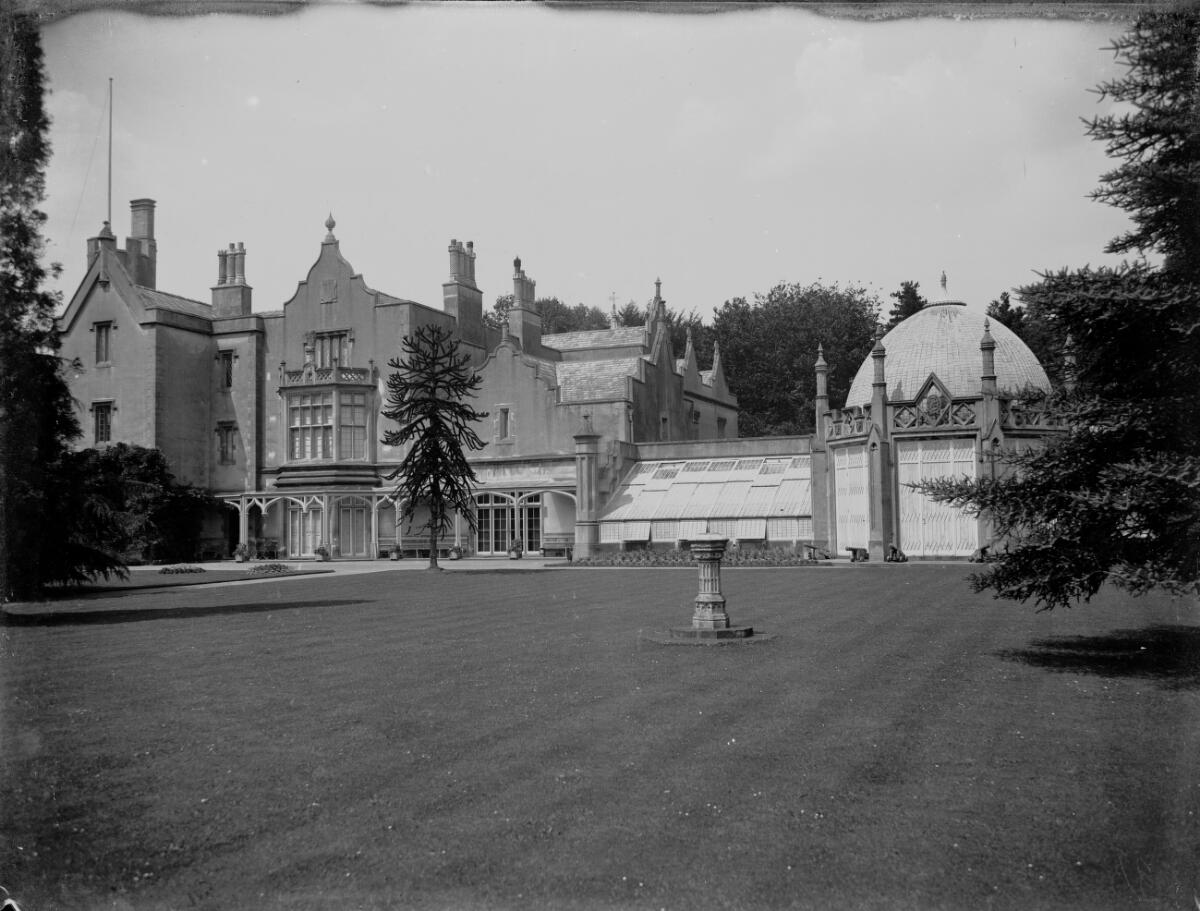
- The abbey c.1900–1910

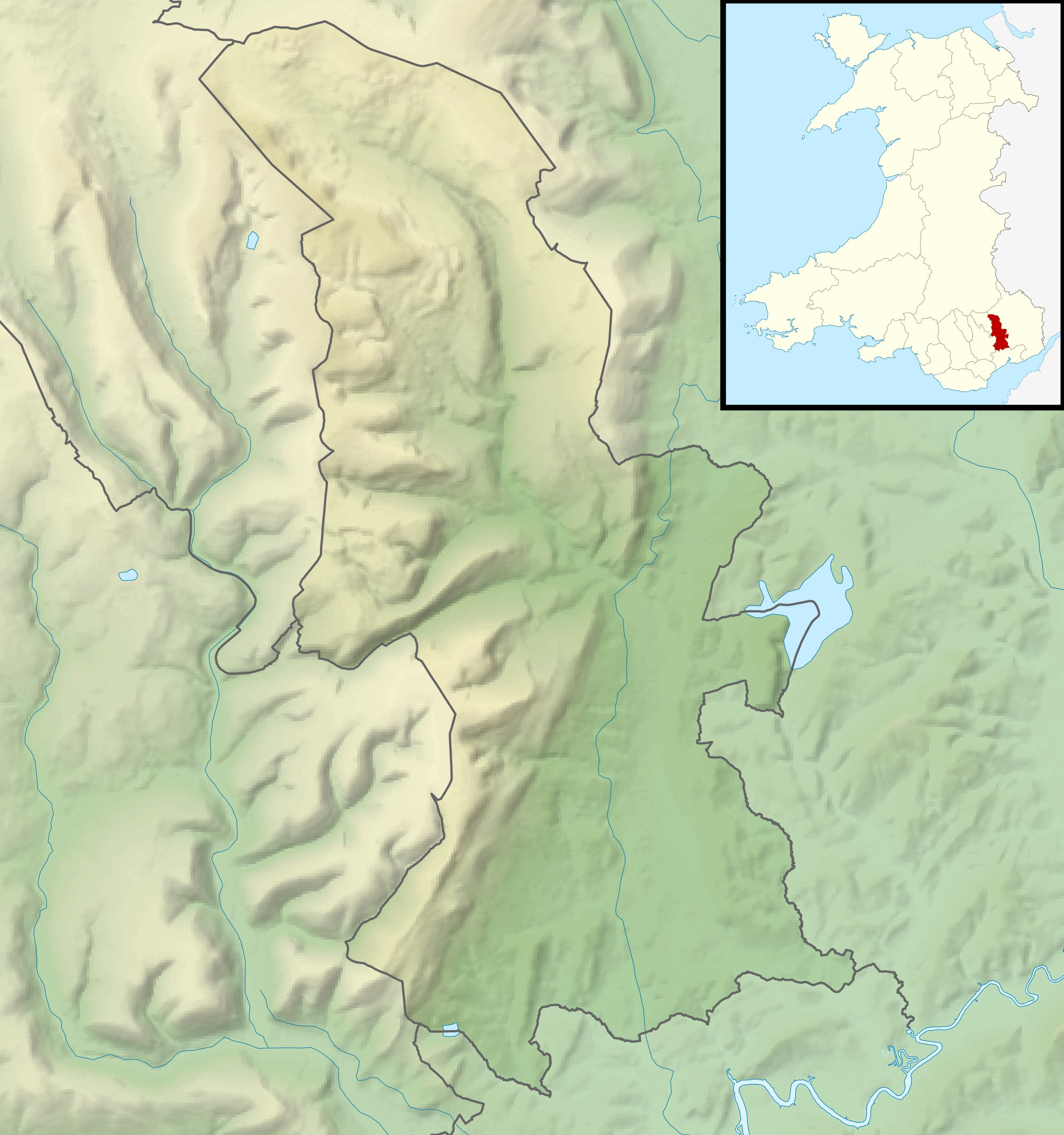
- Location within Torfaen
- 51.6308°N 2.9961°W
- Type: House
- Location: Llantarnam, Torfaen

History
- Built: 16th and early 19th centuries

Site notes
- Architect: Thomas Henry Wyatt
- Architectural style: Tudor Revival architecture
- Governing body: Privately owned

Listed Building – Grade II*
- Official name: Llantarnam Abbey
- Designated: 6 June 1962
- Reference no.: 85246

Listed Building – Grade II
- Official name: Forecourt walls and gates at Llantarnam Abbey
- Designated: 6 June 1962
- Reference no.: 81867

Listed Building – Grade II
- Official name: Garden walls and gates at Llantarnam Abbey
- Designated: 6 June 1962
- Reference no.: 81868

Listed Building – Grade II
- Official name: Two statues in garden to the east of Llantarnam Abbey
- Designated: 30 September 2003
- Reference no.: 81874

Listed Building – Grade II
- Official name: The Monks Cell at Llantarnam Abbey
- Designated: 30 September 2003
- Reference no.: 81873

Llantarnam Abbey is a Grade II*-listed house of the Sisters of St Joseph of Annecy and the site of a former 12th-century Cistercian abbey located in Llantarnam, Cwmbran, in the county borough of Torfaen in southeast Wales.

== History ==
It was founded as a daughter house of Strata Florida Abbey, Ceredigion. Llantarnam Abbey took its place among the Welsh Cistercian abbeys as the revival of political power supported the growth of the Order during the twelfth century. Although various dates are suggested for the year of its foundation, it can be safely attributed to have been founded in the last quarter of the twelfth century. It was to remain active for over three hundred and fifty years before the suppression of 1536 finally closed its doors on 27 August 1536. Later that century, the abbey's vast tracts of lands, including the immediate abbey environs, were sold into the hands of the Morgan family. The landscape associated with the abbey stayed largely intact until the development of Cwmbran new town in 1949.

After its dissolution in 1536, William Morgan of Pentrebach bought the property in 1554 and he later became a Member of Parliament (MP) and High Sheriff. The abbey may have been built by his son Edward Morgan, also an MP and High Sheriff, who was repeatedly fined for his recusancy. His son, Sir Edward Morgan, 1st Baronet was a noted Royalist during the Civil War. The second baronet, also Edward, sheltered the Jesuit priest who was executed at Usk in 1679, Saint David Lewis. The house was only intermittently occupied from then until it came into the hands of Reginald Blewitt. He rebuilt it in Tudor Revival style to the designs of Thomas Henry Wyatt in 1834–36. The renovation supposedly cost £60,000 and that expense, coupled with the collapse of his finances, forced Blewitt into exile from 1851 to 1868. After his death a decade later, the nephew who inherited the property sold the abbey in 1895 to Sir Clifford Cory, colliery owner, shipping magnate and Liberal politician, who lived there until his death in 1941. After his death, it became a depot for the American Army during the Second World War. In 1946 it became again a monastic institution, in the hands of the Sisters of St Joseph of Annecy.

The main abbey building was Grade II* listed on 6 June 1962 "as an early and very elaborate Tudor revival country house."

== Fifteenth- and Sixteenth-Century Abbots ==
- John ap Gruffydd, died 1400
- John ap Hywel, prior, appointed abbot on the death in 1400 of John ap Gruffydd; killed in the Battle of Pwll Melyn, 1405
- William Nunam in 1465
- John, abbot in 1476
- Morgan, abbot in 1532
- Jasper, last abbot, in 1535

== Historiography ==
The first notable historical study of Llantarnam Abbey was researched by Joseph Bradney in his multi-volume A History of Monmouthshire from the Coming of the Normans into Wales down to the Present Time. Bradney's work gives a detailed account of its setting within the landscape while giving as complete a historical account as possible through his available sources at the time. A lot of his work concentrated on the post-medieval period including the pedigrees and heraldic coats of arms concerning the major families connected to the abbey. Also covered by Bradney are histories and observations on the granges and associated lands. These include Cwmbran, Pentre-bach, Ty Coch, St Dials and Llandderfel, with detailed notes on St Michael's parish church. The work is still used as a primary source by the Gwent Glamorgan Archaeological Trust when researching planning decisions on land associated with the abbey and its granges.

In 1979 Sr Teresa Mahoney privately published Llantarnam Abbey: 800 Years of History. Historical records from Llantarnam Abbey and its granges are embellished with historical records from many other Cistercian sites around Britain and Europe. Compiled into a single volume, this culminates in an account which is probably the most complete history of the abbey that embraces an overall European Cistercian perspective. Although Mahoney's study takes into account the Welsh political problems that were associated with Llantarnam through its initial patronage, it also addresses the overall British situation that arose through the dissolution of the monasteries.

The most prolific historian of the Llantarnam Abbey site itself is David H. Williams, who read as a historical geographer at Cambridge. After his initial 1964 article, 'Cistercian Abbots in Medieval Gwent', further publications included 'Llantarnam Abbey' (1967); White Monks in Gwent and the Borders; The Welsh Cistercians: Vols I & II; 'The Cistercians in the Middle Ages and Catalogue of Welsh Ecclesiastical Seals as known down to AD 1600'; Atlas of Cistercian Lands in Wales; Catalogue of Welsh Ecclesiastical Seals in the National Museum of Wales I; and 'Gwent Seals: VI'. In 2001, both of Williams’s 1984 volumes were published as one book.

In contrast, research by Madeleine Gray has used a multi-disciplinary approach predominantly concentrating on the outlying granges on Mynydd Maen, Mynyddislwyn and in the Rhondda valley. This included experimental archaeology, which retraced a long and arduous pilgrimage route from Llantarnam Abbey, through the granges of St Dials and Llandderfel, before arriving at Penrhys in the Rhondda; A post-medieval survey of Henry, Earl of Pembroke's manor of Mynyddislwyn includes many aspects of medieval land use deducted from the survey. Gray also examines the political situation in south Wales regarding the establishment of land endowment and the foundation of granges in south-east Wales.

== Toponymy ==
The study of the place-names relating to Llantarnam has resulted in general agreement across different studies, although there a few anomalies.

Bradney proposes that Llantarnam has its origins in Nant Teyrnon and that Nant has evolved into Llan similar to Llancarfan (Nant Carfan) and Llanthony (Nant Honddu). From a c.1175 deed Bradney suggests that Emsanternon [was] ‘doubtless intended for’ Ynys nant Teyrnon – ‘the island by the brook of the Teyrnon’, while providing a footnote warning that ynys is often used for land situated next to a brook. The personal name Teyrnon, from the Mabinogion, is described as ‘a Lord of Gwent Iscoed and the best man in the world’, while the translation of the full name, Teirnyon Twryf-Vliant is ‘Teyrnon of the rustling fine linen’. Lastly, Bradney mentions that the place name Ddeuma had been associated with the monastery being dedicated to St Deuma. This suggestion was mentioned in a footnote by the editor of a poem by Lewi Glyn Gothi to David ap Watking ap Henry. Although dismissing the possibility of a dedication to St Deuma for the monastery, Bradney suggests that the original dedication of the parish church may have been firstly dedicated to St Deuma before changing to St Michael at a later date.

Osbourne and Hobbs' interpretation of Emsanternon suggests that it derives from the Welsh ynys for ‘water meadow’, nant – ‘valley’ which in turn evolved into meaning ‘stream [running through the valley]’, and the personal name Teyrnon, an early ruler of Gwent. No interpretation of Deuma is proposed but the further place name Vallium, mentioned in 1244, is derived from the Latin for ‘valley’. Further toponymical work on some of Llantarnam's granges has been carried out by Osbourne and Hobbs (1999: 46–47; 2005: 22–24) and Osbourne (2008: 4–6).

Morgan suggests Emsanternon as a mixture of both Bradney's and Osbourne and Hobbs understanding where Ynys is elevated to a ‘raised area in a water-meadow’, while Teyrnon is reduced to Teyrn meaning ‘prince’. Morgan points out that it was not until 1272 that the Latinised Lanterna was instructed to be used in the official lists by the Cistercian General Chapter rather than Vallium which had been recorded in 1244. Vallium is proposed as ‘spurious’ which could have been derived from a misinterpretation of Carlium [Caerleon].

Williams gives a comprehensive synopsis of the various place-names taking into account the recorded place-names that others have omitted.

== Archaeology ==
A Research Framework for the Archaeology of Wales (2003) lists Llantarnam as one of its key medieval sites:- Southeast Wales – Medieval, key sites 22/12/2003 LLANTARNAM (ST309 930) Deserted village in close proximity to a Cistercian Abbey, that appears to have started in 13th century and finally abandoned in 18th century possibly to allow park to the house (the successor to the Abbey) to be created. Excavation in 1980s by Mein in advance of construction of water storage lagoons, by GGAT in early 1990s in advance of the construction of a major road and further works in vicinity by Birmingham University, Wessex Archaeology and Cambrian Archaeological Projects in late 1990s. Reports on all works in SMR but there is no overall published report.

- Mein AG 1982 A deserted village and other remains, Llantarnam Abbey, near Cwmbran, Gwent Anna Rep
- Glamorgan-Gwent Archaeol Trust 1981–2, 47-52
- GGAT 1990 A4042 Newport-Shrewsbury Trunk Road: Llantarnam Bypass DBA
- GGAT 1992 Llantarnam Village Fe
- GGAT 1993 Excavations At Llantarnam Village, Gwent Exc
- GGAT 1994 Abbey Farm Lands, Llantarnam Wb
- Birmingham University 1998 Abbey Farm, Llantarnam Wb
- Cambrian Archaeological Projects 1998 The Former Montressa Tree Nursery, Llantarnam
