= Sir Edward Morgan, 1st Baronet =

Sir Edward Morgan, 1st Baronet of Llantarnam (died 24 June 1653) was a Roman Catholic supporter of Charles I during the Bishops' War and the English Civil War. Charles created him a baronet in recognition of his services, but his capture during the English Civil War led to his estate being sequestered.

== Life ==
Morgan was one of the Morgan family of Llantarnam in Monmouthshire, Wales, an established Roman Catholic family: his great-grandfather William Morgan was a Member of Parliament in the reigns not only of the Catholic Queen Mary but also of the Protestant Queen Elizabeth, and allowed his house to be used for the celebration of mass. Morgan's parents were Thomas* Morgan and Frances, daughter of Edward Somerset, 4th Earl of Worcester, and both supported Catholic activities in Wales. He was educated at Jesus College, Oxford, matriculating in 1616 and obtaining his Bachelor of Arts degree in 1619. He was involved in the Welsh Jesuit headquarters being set up in 1635 in Cwm, Llanrothal, Herefordshire. He was commissioned in the second Bishops' War in 1640 and given permission to obtain contributions from fellow Catholics. This caused controversy in the Long Parliament, and Charles I's reaction was to make Morgan a baronet in 1642; he later renewed Morgan's commission during the English Civil War. Morgan was captured at Hereford on 18 December 1645. The Rump Parliament removed his baronetcy and his estate was sequestered. He died on 24 June 1653; it was not until 9 November 1654 that his estate was discharged. His heir, Sir Edward Morgan, 2nd Baronet, became a Protestant. The Baronet title fell to his son Sir Edward Morgan, 3rd Baronet until his death, he was without male heirs and the Baronet title then went to his uncle: Sir James Morgan, 4th Baronet of Llantarnam, James was the younger son of Morgan and was the last Baronet of Llantarnam.

- Note: At Edward Somerset, 4th Earl of Worcester one finds that the husband of Frances Somerset is listed as William Morgan, esq. of Llantarnam, not Thomas Morgan. It is cited to John Burke and John Bernard Burke., Extinct and Dormant Baronetcies, pp. 369–370.

Baronetage of England
New creation	Baronet (of Llantarnam); 1642–1653	Succeeded by Edward Morgan
