= Morgan baronets of Langattock (1661) =

Escutcheon of the Morgan baronets of Langattock

The Morgan baronetcy, of Llangattock (ambiguous, either of Llangattock Lingoed or Llangattock-Vibon-Avel) in the County of Monmouth, was created in the Baronetage of England on 7 February 1661 for Thomas Morgan, a Parliamentary general of the Wars of the Three Kingdoms.

The 2nd Baronet sat as Member of Parliament for Radnor and Herefordshire. The 3rd Baronet was Member of Parliament for Herefordshire. The 4th Baronet sat as Member of Parliament for Hereford and Herefordshire. The title became extinct on his death in 1767.

== Morgan baronets, of Langattock (1661) ==
- Sir Thomas Morgan, 1st Baronet (c. 1607–1679)
- Sir John Morgan, 2nd Baronet (c. 1650–1693)
- Sir Thomas Morgan, 3rd Baronet (1684–1716)
- Sir John Morgan, 4th Baronet (1710–1767)
