= Ascott House =

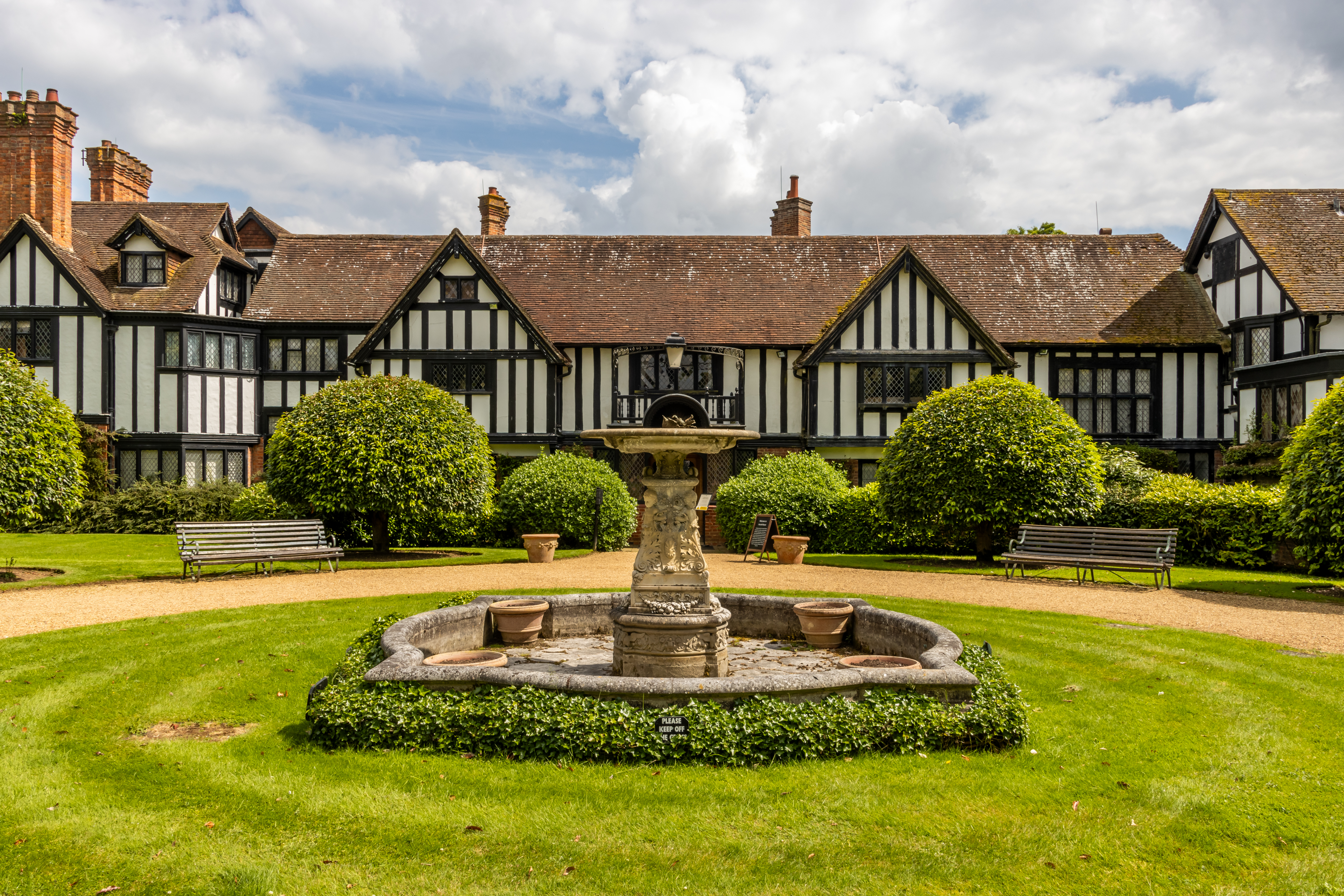
- The centre of the entrance front, the oldest part of the house. A beam over the present front door (behind the fountain) gives the date 1606

- Location within Buckinghamshire Location within England

General information
- Status: Completed
- Type: English country house
- Location: Ascott, Buckinghamshire, England
- Coordinates: 51°53′44″N 0°42′22″W

Ascott House, sometimes referred to as simply Ascott, is a Grade II* listed building in the hamlet of Ascott near Wing in Buckinghamshire, England. It is set in a 32-acre / 13 hectare estate. Ascott House was originally a farm house, built in the reign of James I and known as "Ascott Hall". In 1873 it was acquired by Baron Mayer Amschel de Rothschild (of the neighbouring Mentmore Towers estate). The Rothschild family had begun to acquire vast tracts of land in Buckinghamshire earlier in the century, on which they built a series of large mansions from 1852 onwards. Baron Mayer gave the house at Ascott to his nephew Leopold de Rothschild, who transformed it over the following decades into the substantial yet informal country house that it is today.

== Architecture ==
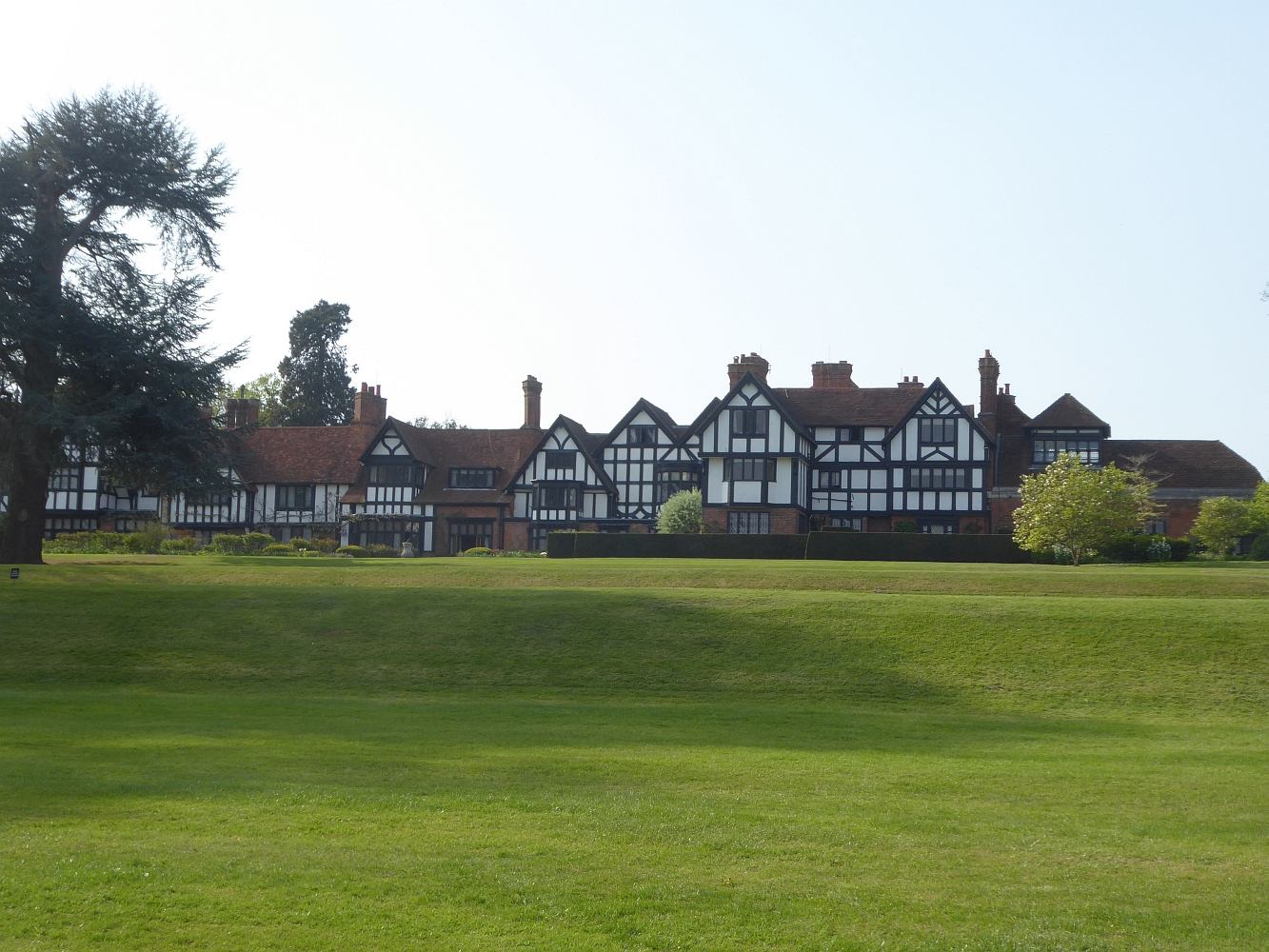
The garden front. From 1874 until the 1930s the house was almost constantly being extended.

Leopold de Rothschild, whose principal country residence was Gunnersbury Park, used Ascott at first as a hunting box, but realising the limitations imposed by its modest size, in 1874 he employed the architect George Devey to enlarge it. The present half-timbered house is largely the result of that commission. Devey attempted to design a house that rambled as though it had grown and developed over centuries. The project became a lifetime work for Devey as the house was continually expanded during the remainder of the 19th century. The rambling and climbing shrubs he had planted as part of the design of the façades that Mary Gladstone described in her memoirs are no longer there.

The style of architecture, which could be described as "English cottage meets Tudor Cheshire Manor house" is informal, the ground floor being of red brick, while the floors above are half-timbered. This rustic design no doubt deliberately reflected the house's original intention as a rural retreat and hunting lodge purely for relaxation and pleasure, and contrasted with the family's alternative country home, the more classical and thus impressive Gunnersbury Park. Other Rothschild houses in Buckinghamshire were all designed in the more formal styles of architecture, either the classical renaissance such as Mentmore or that of a French château as at Waddesdon Manor. The architecture at Ascott was not intended to faithfully reproduce that of an earlier era. Devey was a forerunner of the Arts and Crafts movement and had developed a rustic style of his own. Huge bay windows provide views over the Chiltern Hills. Multiple gables of varying heights with roof lines sweeping to different levels resemble those later designed by the more notable Edwin Lutyens.

== Interior ==
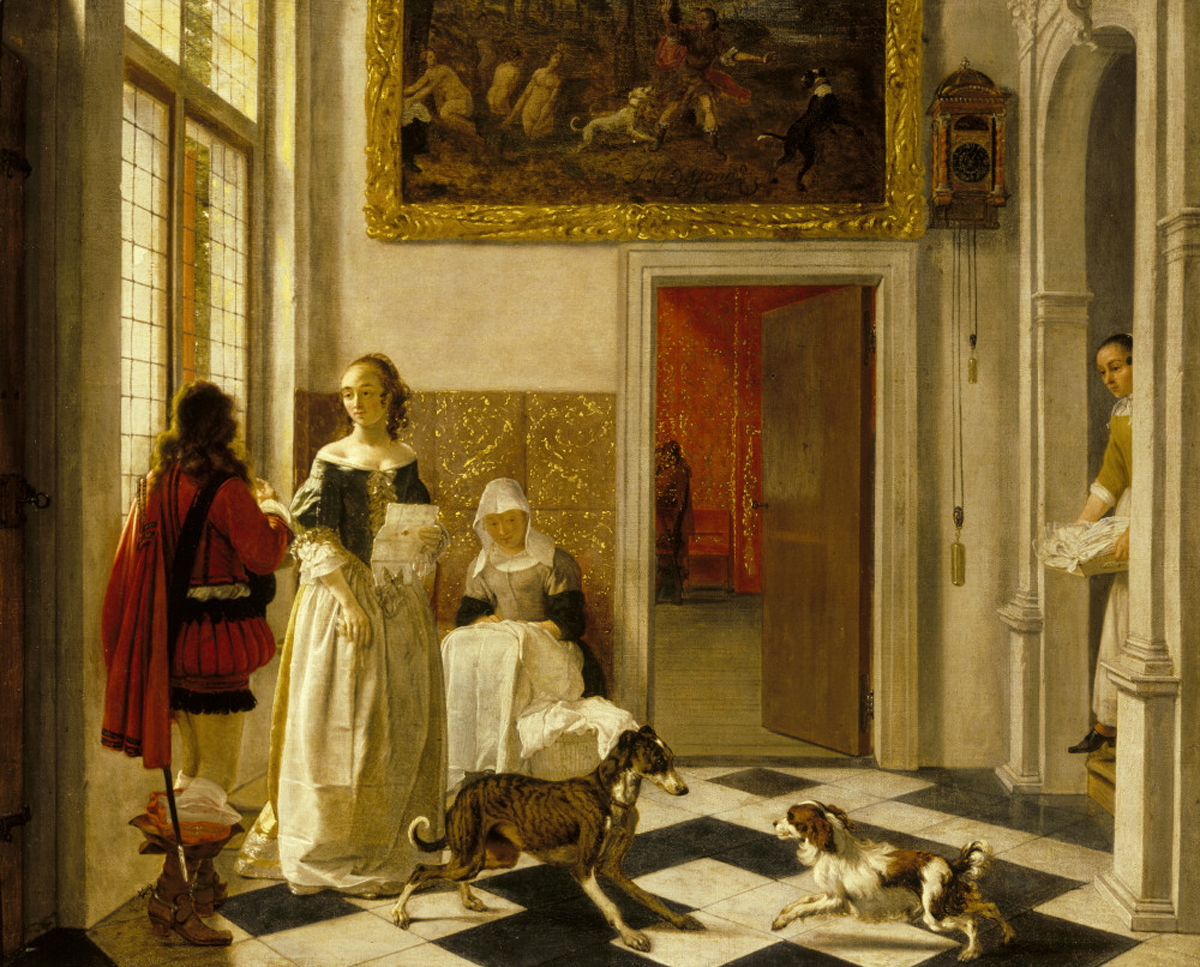
"Lady receiving a letter" by Ludolph de Jongh (1616–1679), bought by Baron Lionel de Rothschild in 1842

On the death of Mrs. Leopold de Rothschild in 1937 the house was inherited by her son Anthony Gustav de Rothschild. He and his wife, the former Yvonne D'Anvers, enlarged the house further, and were responsible for the present interiors, full of notable paintings and (unusually for a Rothschild house) a large collection of 18th-century English furniture.

The ground floor contains the principal suite of large reception rooms, and while these rooms are furnished with works of art and furniture, they are low ceilinged, and, continuing the informal concept of the design, are in no way intended to be state rooms. The entrance hall is notable for its large paintings by Thomas Gainsborough, George Romney, and Joshua Reynolds and the large work by George Stubbs, Five Mares. The dining room, now decorated with what appear to be Dutch tiles but is in fact trompe-l'œil, contains a collection of small, mainly Dutch, paintings from the 16th and 17th centuries by such artists as Aelbert Cuyp, Adriaen van Ostade and Jan Steen.

The works of art continue through the common room, with its portrait of a prelate attributed to Lorenzo Lotto. The Drawing Room today displays a collection of blue Chinese ceramics with examples from the Han dynasty c. 206 BC, to the Qing dynasty which lasted from 1644 until 1911. This room contains the painting of the Madonna and Child with St. John by Andrea del Sarto of 1520.

In 1936 the Billiards Room was transformed into a library to house the many volumes amassed by Anthony de Rothschild. One of the most comfortable rooms in the house, its book-lined walls are only interrupted by Gainsborough's full-length portrait of the Duchess of Richmond, and various other masterpieces. Standing on a console table is Tiepolo's "The Assumption of the Virgin". The room also contains furniture by Thomas Chippendale and ancient Chinese ceramics.

== Gardens ==
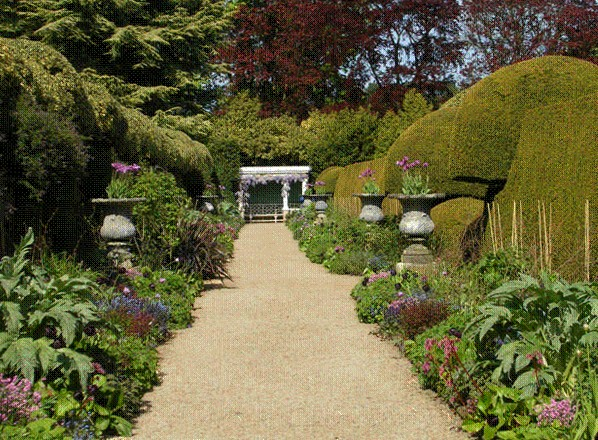
The "Madeira Walk", a path between two mirror herbaceous borders, terminated by George Devey's classical pavilion

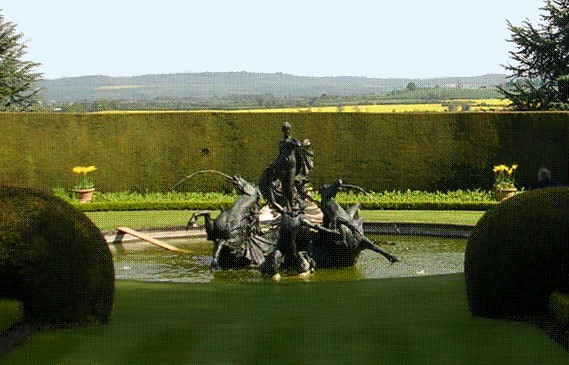
The Venus fountain by Thomas Waldo Story

The extensive manicured gardens were laid out on the advice of the garden designer Sir Harry Veitch c. 1902 by Leopold de Rothschild as a wedding present to his wife. A sundial made entirely of topiary complete with Latin numerals proclaims in clipped yew: "Light and shade by turn, but love always".

Closest to the south front of the house are paved areas of gardens in the style of Gertrude Jekyll, and from these across large areas of lawn are the terraced gardens. The dominating feature of these individual gardens is the clipped hedges, topiary and flowering shrubs. The largest feature of the garden is the bronze fountain representing Venus in her shell chariot attended by cherubs, by the American sculptor Thomas Waldo Story. Story was also responsible for the fountain in the Dutch flower garden. This garden, so named for its displays of tulips in spring, is approached by descending a flight of steps through a rock garden, complete with dripping grotto and artificial stalagmites. In the centre of the garden Story's tall fountain, crowned by Cupid supported by dolphins, is surrounded by a formal bedding scheme.

From the entrance front's adjacent garden of topiarised box and bay trees a long-grassed avenue, enclosed by a tall beech hedge, leads to the lily pool. This pool, originally created for skating, is the heart of a Monet-style garden, complete with a thatched summerhouse also designed by George Devey.

== Cricket ground ==
Cricket was first played at Ascott House on 28 August 1880, when an eleven brought from London played an eleven selected by a Mr. Tennant, whose players were partly from London and partly from the area surrounding the estate. Leopold de Rothschild was present for this first match. The Rothschild family played a prominent role in the formation of Buckinghamshire County Cricket Club. Buckinghamshire first played at Ascott House in the 1905 Minor Counties Championship against Hertfordshire, playing there regularly once a season to 1979.

The county returned to Ascott in 1998 to play an MCCA Knockout Trophy match against Berkshire. Minor Counties Championship cricket was last played there in 2003, with Buckinghamshire's last venture to the ground coming 2009 in the MCCA Knockout Trophy against Lincolnshire. The ground held a List A match once, which came in the 2003 Cheltenham & Gloucester Trophy when first-class county Gloucestershire were the visitors. The match was something of a mismatch, with Gloucestershire scoring a massive 401/7, then bowling Buckinghamshire out for 77 to win the match by 324 runs.

== Ascott today ==
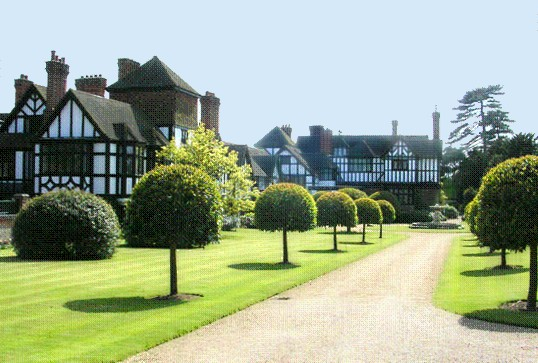
The approach to the principal entrance, lined by clipped bay trees

Ascott House, with some of its important art collection and a small part of the estate, was given in 1947 to the National Trust by Anthony de Rothschild. The National Trust market the property under the name "Ascott". However, as at nearby Waddesdon Manor, the Rothschild family retain a very close control. The last resident of the house was the son of the donor, Sir Evelyn de Rothschild, who died in 2022. He added further works of art and ceramics to the collection and much of what is seen in the collection is still privately owned by the Rothschild family.

Sir Evelyn de Rothschild also expanded the estate to its present size of approximately 3200 acres (13 km^{2}). The estate contains many miles of new road-side tree planting, well-kept hedging, and cropping and planting of new woodland but retains some of the older permanent pasture and small fields. A major new road, the A505 ploughs through the area between the house and its Stud Farm, but has been disguised by dense woodland planting.

The house retains very much the feel of a private home, and is open to the public in the afternoon of many weekdays during summer.

== See also ==
- Rothschild properties in England
- Rothschild family
