= George Devey =

English architect

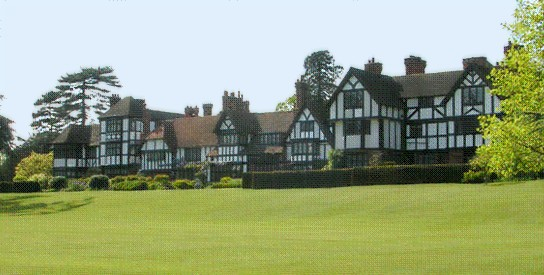
Ascott House, Wing, designed by George Devey. The garden front, begun 1874, but later extended. The house was designed to appear as though it had evolved over centuries

George Devey (1820, London – 1886, Hastings, Sussex) was an English architect notable for his work on country houses and their estates, especially those belonging to the Rothschild family. The second son of Frederick and Ann Devey, he was born and educated in London.

After leaving school he studied art, under John Sell Cotman and James Duffield Harding with an ambition to become a professional artist, but later trained as an architect.

== Career ==
During his professional career Devey had a London office in Great Marlborough Street, where he specialised in country houses and estate cottages and lodges.

His first important work, in 1850, was on a group of cottages at the entrance gate of Penshurst Place in Kent, where he modified and added to existing buildings, to create a picturesque composition, with the intention of creating an illusion of genuine antiquity. He worked extensively for the Duke of Sutherland at Cliveden in Buckinghamshire where he designed lodges and cottages in the vernacular style of the Sussex Weald. He often used tiles and timbers on external walls, in a way evocative or earlier periods, but always in a slightly differing way to the original. This style he adapted and personalised until it had his own distinctive stamp. Devey's style was later developed by other architects such as Richard Norman Shaw and Charles Voysey, both of whom studied under him, and who were to be founder members of the Arts and Crafts movement a generation later.

He often tried to create an artificial impression of a building's age, and of its development over time, by combining the styles and materials of different eras. For instance at St Alban's Court at Nonington in Kent he built a brick upper level over a ragstone ground floor, the irregular join giving that gives the impression the stone part was from an earlier, ruined, structure.

== Commissions for the Rothschild family ==
Despite having been in practice since the 1850s, business was slow until he was discovered by the Rothschild family. This international dynasty of bankers would provide Devey with numerous commissions and ensure a steady stream of work.

Devey first appears in Rothschild account books as the architect for a new school at Hulcott, and the rebuilding of the parsonage there. In 1863 he came to attention of Sir Anthony de Rothschild when he designed Buckland School for the vicar Edward Bonus on a site donated by the Rothschilds. He succeeded Joseph Paxton's son-in-law George H. Stokes as Baron Mayer de Rothschild's architect for the estate village at Mentmore, designing the stables and riding school there between 1869 and 1870. After the Baron's death in 1877, Devey continued in the employ of his daughter Hannah de Rothschild building cottages at Wingrave and Mentmore. His most notable works on the Mentmore Estate are: Rosebery Arms at Cheddington, the School House at Cheddington, and the Thatched Lodge, which stands at the end of a long avenue approach to Mentmore Towers.

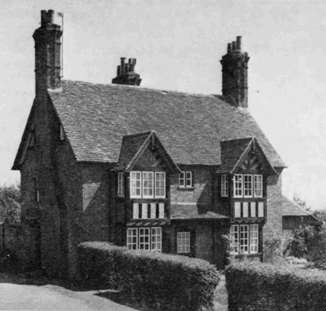
Two cottages at Mentmore designed to appear as one house, typical of those designed by George Devey for Hannah de Rothschild. The tall chimneys were to be a feature employed by Lutyens thirty years later Photographed circa 1968.

Devey was largely responsible for Ascott House, a neo-Tudor extravaganza developed from a small half-timbered farmhouse. He began work there in 1874 for Leopold de Rothschild. This house, conceived as a small hunting box, expanded, the intention was to make the house seem as though it had grown and developed over centuries. Devey designed numerous half-timbered extensions. He was still working on the house at his death in 1886, when his partner James Williams took over the project. Ascott House is probably Devey's greatest monument, although further half-timbered extensions continued to be added to this house as late as the 1930s. Devey was also responsible for the large cottages on the Green, near the entrance of Ascott House, (now the Ascott Estate Office); these are very similar to those he designed at St. Albans's Court, Kent, in the late 1880s.

A further Rothschild house by Devey was Aston Clinton, where he worked with George Stokes. The Italianate house with its huge porte-cochere is now demolished, a casualty of the huge country house demolitions of the 1950s. However, the Lodge and stables by Devey still stand, as does his West Lodge at Aston Clinton.

Although the records were destroyed in World War II, he is also believed to have worked on the "improvements" at Tring Park between 1874 and 1878, which involved turning a house designed by Sir Christopher Wren into a dix-huitieme French chateau complete with mansard roof. Devey later built a house very similar to the transformed Tring in Lennox Gardens, London, for a Mrs. Hunloke.

Devey was capable of working on more than one project at a time. In 1876, Alice de Rothschild commissioned him to build her a house at Eythrope in the Vale of Aylesbury. After the plans were drawn up, his patroness decided water at night was bad for her health Since the house was in a bend of the River Thame, rather than abandon the site, she decided Devey must design a house without bedrooms, and she would decamp every evening to her brother's home, Waddesdon Manor. The result was the Eythrope Water Pavilion, one of the smaller of the Rothschild houses of Buckinghamshire, its design is an unostentatious complement to the great faux-chateau four miles away of Waddesdon Manor. Today (with a bedroom wing added in the 1920s) it is the only Rothschild mansion still in private hands in the Vale of Aylesbury. The Rothschilds also commissioned him to undertake work at their newly acquired property The King's Head in Aylesbury itself. His work mainly consisted of creating what was considered a typical Tudor experience in the 14th century coaching inn, but actually followed Victorian conventions of the time. Much of his work here was not corrected until after the property was given to the National Trust, when a more authentic Tudor appearance was restored, though elements of his design can still be seen. He designed in Hampshire for George Carnegie, 9th Earl of Northesk

Devey had an interest in garden design and played an important role in not only the houses he designed, but also in garden buildings and follies. At Ascott this included the thatched half-timbered summer house, or skating hut overlooking the circular lily pool. He has also been credited with the design of the neo-Grecian temple terminating the avenue of mirror herbaceous borders, but the style is to very different that he normally employed.

== Other patrons ==
The Shropshire Archives hold an archive on the rebuilding of Adderley Hall by Henry Reginald Corbet, who invited Devey "to inspect the old house of Adderley to make it habitable". Devey concluded that little could be done on account of its outlook and recommended it be pulled down and a new hall placed on an elevated position to the northwest. Devey's plans that were not to his clients' satisfaction and following discussions, led by Mrs Corbet, a new design was agreed.

In about 1875, Richard Henry Ainsworth employed Devey to extend and modernise Smithills Hall, his home near Bolton.

== Personal life ==
Devey's father was a London solicitor whose family originated from Worfield, Shropshire and Pattingham, Staffordshire. His mother, Ann, was the daughter of Durs Egg, a London gunmaker born in Switzerland and the artist Augustus Leopold Egg was a second cousin.

Little is known of Devey's personal life. As a young man, he had been in love with Flora Hoskins, the daughter of the vicar of Chiddingstone, near Penshurst. He left her £5,000 in his will "on account of the engagement so cruelly broken off between us". In 1857, she married a clergy man, the Revd. H. W. Streatfield, of the Chiddingstone Castle family. He died in 1866 and Devey proposed to her again (according to W. H. Godfrey in R.I.B.A Journal, 3rd series, XII (1906), p. 505). Owing to "certain divergences he was preferred to as a friend". The divergences were probably religious. Devey later supported the Theistic Church of the Revd. Charles Vosey (father of the architect C. F. A. Voysey).

He never married; on the 1881 census he is recorded living with an elderly aunt, cousin and elder brother at 12 Pelham Crescent, Hastings. He died there in November 1886. While never a household name, in the world of architecture he does have considerable standing. There is no doubt that his style was the forerunner of the arts and crafts school of design.

== References and sources ==
Sources

- Davey, Peter (1995) [1980]. Arts and Crafts Architecture. Oxford: Phaidon. ISBN 0714837113.
- Country Life Magazine. Vol CLXXIII No. 7. 16 February 1989, pp 80 – 83.
- Country Life Magazine. Vol CLXXIII No. 8. 23 February 1989, pp 110 – 115.
- National Trust (1963). The Ascott collection. The National Trust.
