= Rothschild =

Rothschild (German pronunciation: [ˈʁoːt.ʃɪlt]) is a name derived from the German zum rothen Schild (with the old spelling "th"), meaning "at the red shield", in reference to the houses where these family members lived or had lived. At the time, houses were designated by signs with different symbols or colors, not numbers. The name Rothschild in Yiddish means "red coat" (coat as in heraldic coat of arms). The Rothschild banking family's coat of arms features in the center of its heraldry a red shield.

== People ==
The most notable family of people with this surname are descendants of Mayer Amschel Rothschild who formed a financial dynasty and, in modern history, perhaps the wealthiest family by the scale of their private fortune.

In Denmark, by royal decree of 29 March 1814, all Danish Jews were obliged to adopt a surname after their town of residence. In the records, one family with residence in Roskilde took the name Rothschild, presumably because of the German pronunciation of the town's name. The mother of writer Meïr Aron Goldschmidt, Lea Rothschild (born 1797), was of that family. There are no indications that the Rothschilds of Roskilde had any relation with the other Rothschild families.

The name is also carried by others, mostly Ashkenazi Jews, who are not related to members of the banking family.

== People outside the banking family ==
- Abram M. Rothschild (1863–1902), American businessman and founder of A. M. Rothschild & Company Store
- Abraham Rothschild (1854–1877), American traveling salesman and murderer of Diamond Bessie.
- Alonzo Rothschild (1862–1915) parents unknown, son, John fared well in the travel industry, wrote the book "Honest Abe."
- Amalie Rothschild (1916–2001), American artist
- Bruce Lee Rothschild (born 1941), American mathematician
- Daniel Rothschild (philosopher) (born 1979), American philosopher
- Daniel Rothschild (general) (born 1946), Israeli major general
- Dorothy Rothschild, better known as Dorothy Parker (1893–1967), American poet and writer
- Eva Rothschild (born 1971), Irish artist based in London
- Friedrich S. Rothschild (1899–1995), German-Jewish psychiatrist and semiotician
- Geoffrey Rothschild (born 1947), South African businessman, former chairman of JSE Limited.
- Jean Maurice Rothschild (1902–1998), French furniture designer
- Jeffrey J. Rothschild (b. 1954), American billionaire entrepreneur and business executive; Vice President of Infrastructure Software for Facebook.
- Jonathan Rothschild (born 1955), American (Arizona) lawyer and politician, mayor of Tucson
- Joseph Rothschild (1931–2000), American historian
- Larry Rothschild (born 1954), American Baseball pitcher and manager
- Louis F. Rothschild (1869–1957), founder of the defunct L.F. Rothschild merchant and investment banking firm
- Lynn J. Rothschild (born 1957), American evolutionary biologist and astrobiologist
- Michael Rothschild (born 1942), American economist, former dean at Princeton
- Michelle Rothschild-Patterson (born 1951), American television personality better known as Sister Patterson
- Robert Rothschild (1911–1978), Belgian diplomat (descendant of Amschel Moses Rothschild)
- Samuel Rothschild (1899–1987), Canadian ice hockey player
- Simon F. Rothschild (1861–1936), American businessman Chair Abraham & Straus
- Victor Henry Rothschild (1835–1911), American businessman

== People of the banking family ==
=== A ===
- Adèle von Rothschild (1843–1922), German socialite, daughter of Mayer Carl von Rothschild and wife of her 2nd cousin Salomon James de Rothschild
- Adelheid von Rothschild (1853–1935), daughter of Wilhelm Carl von Rothschild
- Albert Salomon Anselm von Rothschild (1844–1911), Austrian banker, son of Anselm von Rothschild
- Alfred de Rothschild (1842–1918), English banker, son of Lionel de Rothschild
- Alice Charlotte von Rothschild (1847–1922), Austrian socialite, daughter of Anselm von Rothschild
- Aline Caroline de Rothschild (1867–1909), French socialite, daughter of Baron Gustave de Rothschild
- Alphonse James de Rothschild (1827–1905), French businessman and philanthropist, son of James Mayer de Rothschild
- Amschel Mayor James Rothschild (1955–1996), British businessman, son of Victor Rothschild
- Amschel Mayer von Rothschild (1773–1855), German banker, son of Mayer Amschel Rothschild
- Amschel Moses Rothschild (c. 1710–1755), German trader, father of Mayer Amschel Rothschild
- Anselm von Rothschild (1803–1874), Austrian banker, son of Salomon Mayer von Rothschild
- Anthony Gustav de Rothschild (1887–1961), British banker, son of Leopold de Rothschild
- Anthony James de Rothschild (b. 1977), British businessman, son of Evelyn Robert de Rothschild
- Anthony Nathan de Rothschild (1810–1876), British banker, son of Nathan Mayer Rothschild
- Ariane de Rothschild (née Langner 1965), French banker, wife of Benjamin de Rothschild
- Arthur de Rothschild (1851–1903), French socialite, son of Nathaniel and Charlotte de Rothschild

=== B ===
- Béatrice Ephrussi de Rothschild (1864–1934), French socialite and art collector, daughter of Alphonse James de Rothschild
- Benjamin de Rothschild (1963–2021), Swiss banker, son of Edmond Adolphe de Rothschild
- Bethsabée de Rothschild (1914–1999), Jewish philanthropist, daughter of Édouard Alphonse de Rothschild
- Bettina Caroline de Rothschild (1858–1892, French socialite, daughter of Alphonse James de Rothschild, wife of her cousin Albert Salomon von Rothschild
- Betty von Rothschild, Baronne de Rothschild (1805–1886), French socialite, daughter of Salomon Mayer von Rothschild, wife of her uncle James Mayer de Rothschild

=== C ===
- Carl Mayer von Rothschild (1788–1855), German banker, son of Mayer Amschel Rothschild
- Cécile de Rothschild (1913–1995), French socialite and friend of Greta Garbo, daughter of Robert Philippe de Rothschild
- Charles Rothschild (1877–1923), English banker and entomologist, son of Nathan, 1st Baron Rothschild
- Charlotte de Rothschild (1825–1899), French socialite and painter, daughter of James Mayer de Rothschild, wife of her cousin Nathaniel de Rothschild
- Charlotte von Rothschild (1819–1884), British socialite, daughter of Carl Mayer von Rothschild, wife of her first cousin Lionel de Rothschild
- Charlotte Henriette de Rothschild (b. 1955), British singer, daughter of Edmund Leopold de Rothschild
- Charlotte Nathan Rothschild (1807–1859), British socialite, daughter of Nathan Mayer Rothschild, wife of her first cousin Anselm von Rothschild

=== D ===
- David Mayer de Rothschild (b. 1978), British adventurer, ecologist, and environmentalist, son of Evelyn Robert de Rothschild
- David René de Rothschild (b. 1942), French banker, son of Guy de Rothschild
- Dorothy de Rothschild (née Pinto 1895–1988), English philanthropist, wife of James Armand de Rothschild

=== E ===
- Edmond Adolphe de Rothschild (1926–1997), French-Swiss banker
- Edmond James de Rothschild (1845–1934), French banker, son of James Mayer de Rothschild
- Edmund Leopold de Rothschild (1916–2009), British banker, son of Lionel Nathan de Rothschild
- Édouard de Rothschild (b. 1957), French businessman and equestrian, son of Guy de Rothschild
- Edouard Alphonse de Rothschild (1868–1949), French financier, son of Alphonse James de Rothschild
- Élie de Rothschild (1917–2007), French banker, son of Robert Philippe de Rothschild
- Elisabeth de Rothschild (née de Chambure 1902–1945), French vintner, wife of Philippe de Rothschild
- Emma Georgina Rothschild (b. 1948), British historian and professor, daughter of Victor Rothschild
- Evelina de Rothschild (1839–1866), English socialite, daughter of Lionel de Rothschild, wife of her 2nd cousin Ferdinand James von Rothschild
- Evelyn Achille de Rothschild (1886–1917), British banker, son of Leopold de Rothschild
- Evelyn Robert de Rothschild (1931-2022), British financier, son of Anthony Gustav de Rothschild

=== F ===
- Ferdinand James von Rothschild (1839–1898), British politician and art collector, son of Anselm von Rothschild

=== G ===
- Guy de Rothschild (1909–2007), French banker, son of Édouard Alphonse de Rothschild

=== H ===
- Hannah Rothschild (b. 1962), British writer, businesswoman, philanthropist and documentary filmmaker. Daughter of Jacob Rothschild, 4th Baron Rothschild
- Hannah de Rothschild, Countess of Rosebery (1851–1890), British philanthropist, daughter of Mayer Amschel de Rothschild
- Hélène de Rothschild, better known as Hélène van Zuylen (1863–1947), French socialite and author, daughter of Salomon James de Rothschild

=== J ===
- Jacob Rothschild, 4th Baron Rothschild (1936–2024), British banker, son of Victor Rothschild
- Jacqueline de Rothschild (1911–2012), French-born American chess and tennis player, daughter of Édouard Alphonse de Rothschild
- James Armand de Rothschild (1878–1957), British politician and philanthropist, son of son of Edmond James de Rothschild
- James Mayer de Rothschild (born Jakob Rothschild 1792–1868), German-French banker, son of Mayer Amschel Rothschild
- Jeanne de Rothschild, née Stuart (1908–2003), British actress, wife of Baron Eugène Daniel von Rothschild

=== L ===
- Leonora de Rothschild (1837–1911), British socialite, daughter of Lionel de Rothschild, wife of Alphonse James de Rothschild
- Leopold de Rothschild (1845–1917), British banker and horse breeder, son of Lionel de Rothschild
- Leopold David de Rothschild (1927–2012), British financier and musician, son of Lionel Nathan de Rothschild
- Lionel de Rothschild (1808–1879), British banker and politician, son of Nathan Mayer Rothschild
- Lionel Nathan de Rothschild (1882–1942), British banker and politician, son of Leopold de Rothschild
- Louis Nathaniel de Rothschild (1882–1955), Austrian baron, son of Albert Salomon von Rothschild
- Lynn Forester de Rothschild (née Forester, b. 1954), American businesswoman, wife of Evelyn Robert de Rothschild

=== M ===
- Marie-Hélène de Rothschild (1927–1996), French socialite, granddaughter of Hélène de Rothschild and wife of Guy de Rothschild
- Mathilde Hannah von Rothschild (1832–1924), German baroness and composer, daughter of Anselm von Rothschild, wife of her 2nd cousin Wilhelm Carl von Rothschild
- Mayer Amschel Rothschild (1744–1812), German banker and founder of the Rothschild banking dynasty
- Mayer Amschel de Rothschild (1818–1874), British politician, son of Nathan Mayer Rothschild
- Miriam Rothschild (1908–2005), British naturalist and author, daughter of Charles Rothschild

=== N ===
- Nadine de Rothschild (née Lhopitalier; born 1932), French author and actress, wife of Edmond Adolphe de Rothschild
- Nathan Mayer Rothschild (1777–1836), Jewish banker, son of Mayer Amschel Rothschild
- Nathan Mayer Rothschild, 1st Baron Rothschild (1840–1915), British banker and politician, son of Lionel de Rothschild
- Nathaniel de Rothschild (1812–1870), French banker, businessman, and wine maker, son of Nathan Mayer Rothschild
- Nathaniel Meyer von Rothschild (1836–1905), Austrian socialite, son of Anselm von Rothschild
- Nathaniel Philip Victor James Rothschild, 5th Baron Rothschild (born 1971), a British financier, son of Jacob Rothschild, 4th Baron Rothschild
- Pannonica "Nica" Rothschild (1913–1988), jazz patroness and writer, daughter of Charles Rothschild

=== P ===
- Pauline de Rothschild (née Potter, 1908–1976), French writer and fashion designer, wife of Philippe de Rothschild
- Philippe de Rothschild (1902–1988), French race car driver, screenwriter, producer, and wine grower, son of Henri de Rothschild
- Philippine de Rothschild (1933–2014), French actress and wine grower, daughter of Philippe de Rothschild

=== S ===
- Salomon James de Rothschild (1835–1864), son of James Mayer de Rothschild
- Salomon Mayer von Rothschild (1774–1855), German banker, son of Mayer Amschel Rothschild
- Serena Dunn Rothschild (née Dunn, 1935-2019), wife of Jacob, 4th Baron Rothschild

=== V ===
- Victor Rothschild, 3rd Baron Rothschild (1910–1990), a British biologist and cricketer, son of Charles Rothschild

=== W ===
- Walter Rothschild, 2nd Baron Rothschild (1868–1937), British banker, politician, and zoologist, son of Nathan, 1st Baron Rothschild
- Wilhelm Carl von Rothschild (1828–1901), German banker, son of Carl Mayer von Rothschild

== Fictional characters ==
- Winston Rothschild III (fictional character from The Red Green Show)

== Bibliography ==
- Hanks, Patrick Dictionary of American Family Names Oxford University Press ISBN 0-19-508137-4
