= Rothschild banking family of England =

British banking family

The coat of arms of Nathaniel Rothschild, current head of this branch

The Rothschild banking family of England is the British branch of the Rothschild family. It was founded in 1798 by Nathan Mayer Rothschild (1777–1836), who first settled in Manchester before moving to London, Kingdom of Great Britain (in present-day United Kingdom). He was sent there from his home in Frankfurt by his father, Mayer Amschel Rothschild (1744–1812). Wanting his sons to succeed on their own and expand the family business across Europe, Mayer Amschel Rothschild had his eldest son remain in Frankfurt, while his four other sons were sent to different European cities to establish a financial institution to invest in business and provide banking services. Nathan Mayer Rothschild, the third son, first established a textile jobbing business in Manchester and from there went on to establish N M Rothschild & Sons bank in London.

From the family's home base in Frankfurt, the Rothschild family not only established itself in London but also in Paris, Vienna and Naples in the Two Sicilies. Through their collaborative efforts, the Rothschilds rose to prominence in a variety of banking endeavours, including loans, government bonds and trading in bullion. Their financing afforded investment opportunities, and during the 19th century, they became major stakeholders in large-scale mining and rail transport ventures that were fundamental to the rapidly expanding industrial economies of Europe.

Changes in governments, wars and other such events affected the family's fortunes, both for their benefit and to their detriment at various times. Despite such changes, the British branch of the Rothschild family is arguably the most prominent of all the Rothschild branches, partly due to its elevation to the British peerage and its continued high-profile philanthropic activities.

== Involvement in finance and industry ==
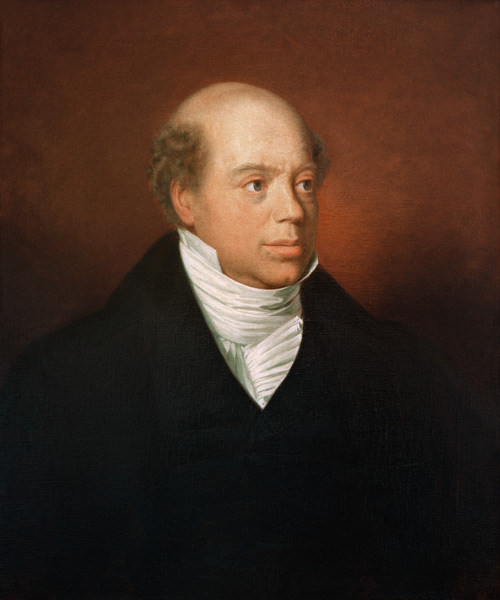
Nathan Mayer Rothschild, founder of the British branch of the Rothschild banking dynasty.

During the early part of the 19th century, the Rothschild family's London bank took a leading part in managing and financing the subsidies that the British government transferred to its allies during the Napoleonic Wars. Through the creation of a network of agents, couriers and shippers, the bank was able to provide funds to the armies of the Duke of Wellington in Portugal and Spain. In 1818, the Rothschild bank arranged a £5 million loan to the Prussian government and the issuing of bonds for government loans. The providing of other innovative and complex financing for government projects formed a mainstay of the bank's business for the better part of the century. The financial strength of N M Rothschild & Sons in the City of London became such that by 1825–26, the bank was able to supply enough coin to the Bank of England to enable it to avert a liquidity crisis.

Nathan Mayer's eldest son, Lionel de Rothschild (1808–1879), succeeded him as head of the London branch. Under Lionel, the bank financed the British government's 1875 purchase of Egypt's interest in the Suez Canal. Lionel also began to invest in railways, as his uncle James had been doing in France. In 1869, Lionel's son, Alfred de Rothschild (1842–1918), became a director of the Bank of England, a post he held for 20 years. Alfred was one of those who represented the British government at the 1892 International Monetary Conference in Brussels.

The Rothschild bank funded Cecil Rhodes in the development of the British South Africa Company, and Leopold de Rothschild (1845–1917) administered Rhodes's estate after his death in 1902 and helped to set up the Rhodes Scholarship scheme at Oxford University. In 1873, de Rothschild Frères in France and N M Rothschild & Sons of London joined with other investors to acquire the Spanish government's money-losing Rio Tinto copper mines. The new owners restructured the company and turned it into a profitable business. By 1905, the Rothschild interest in Rio Tinto amounted to more than 30 per cent. In 1887, the French and English Rothschild banking houses loaned money to, and invested in, the De Beers diamond mines in South Africa, becoming its largest shareholders.

The London banking house continued under the management of Lionel Nathan de Rothschild (1882–1942) and his brother Anthony Gustav de Rothschild (1887–1961), and then to Sir Evelyn de Rothschild (1931–2022). In 2003, following Sir Evelyn's retirement as head of N M Rothschild & Sons of London, the British and French financial firms merged under the leadership of David René de Rothschild.

== Other activities ==
Beyond banking and finance, members of the Rothschild family in the UK became academics, scientists and horticulturalists with worldwide reputations.

Nathaniel de Rothschild (1812–1870) was born in London, the fourth child of the founder of the British branch of the family. In 1842, he married his cousin Charlotte de Rothschild (1825–1899) of Paris, France. She was the daughter of James Mayer de Rothschild, and in 1850, they moved to Paris, where he was to work for his father-in-law's bank. However, in 1853, Nathaniel acquired Château Brane Mouton, a vineyard at Pauillac in the Gironde département of France.

== Elevation to British peerage ==
In 1822, the five Rothschild brothers at the head of the family's banks in various parts of Europe were each granted the hereditary title of Freiherr (baron) in the Austrian nobility by Emperor Francis I of Austria (formerly Francis II, the last Holy Roman Emperor). As a result, some members of the Rothschild family used the nobiliary particle de or von before their surname to acknowledge the grant of nobility.

In 1847, Anthony Nathan de Rothschild (1810–1876) was made a baronet in the Baronetage of the United Kingdom. Upon his death, the title went to his nephew Nathan Mayer Rothschild, who was subsequently elevated to the House of Lords when he was created Baron Rothschild in 1885, with which title the baronetcy remains merged.

In 1858, Lionel de Rothschild (1808–1879) became the first practising Jew to take a seat in the British Parliament.

== Philanthropy ==
The British Rothschilds and members of the other branches in Europe were all major contributors to causes in aid of the Jewish people. However, many of their philanthropic efforts extended far beyond Jewish ethnic or religious communities. They built hospitals and shelters for the needy, supported cultural institutions and were patrons of individual artists. Their donation of works of art to various galleries has been the largest of any family in history. At present, a research project is underway by the Rothschild Archive in London to document the family's philanthropic involvements.

== Family members ==
Members of the Rothschild family of the UK include:

- Alfred de Rothschild (1842–1918)
- Amschel Rothschild (1955–1996)
- Anthony Gustav de Rothschild (1887–1961)
- Anthony James de Rothschild (b. 1977)
- Sir Anthony de Rothschild, 1st Baronet (1810–1876)
- Charles Rothschild (1877–1923)
- Charlotte Henriette de Rothschild (b. 1955)
- David Mayer de Rothschild (b. 1978)
- Dorothy de Rothschild (1895–1988)
- Edmund Leopold de Rothschild (1916–2009)
- Emma Rothschild (b. 1948)
- Evelina de Rothschild (1839–1866)
- Evelyn de Rothschild (1886–1917)
- Sir Evelyn de Rothschild (1931–2022)
- Ferdinand James von Rothschild (1839–1898)
- Hannah de Rothschild, Countess of Rosebery (1851–1890)
- Iona Annabelle Neilson Rothschild (1969–2018)
- Jacob Rothschild, 4th Baron Rothschild (1936–2024)
- Kathleen (Nica de Koenigswarter) Rothschild (1913–1988)
- Leopold de Rothschild (1845–1917)
- Leopold David de Rothschild (1927–2012)
- Lionel de Rothschild (1808–1879)
- Lionel Nathan de Rothschild (1882–1942)
- Lynn Forester de Rothschild (b. 1954)
- Mayer Amschel de Rothschild (1818–1874)
- Miriam Louisa Rothschild (1908–2005)
- Nathaniel de Rothschild (1812–1870)
- Nathan Mayer Rothschild (1777–1836)
- Nathan Rothschild, 1st Baron Rothschild (1840–1915)
- Nathaniel Rothschild, 5th Baron Rothschild (b. 1971)
- Serena Dunn Rothschild (1935–2019)
- Victor Rothschild, 3rd Baron Rothschild (1910–1990)
- Walter Rothschild, 2nd Baron Rothschild (1868–1937)

== Rothschild properties ==
Among the Rothschild properties in the UK are:

- Ascott House – Ascott, Buckinghamshire
- Ashton Wold – Northamptonshire
- Aston Clinton House – Aston Clinton, Buckinghamshire
- Exbury Estate – Hampshire
- Eythrope – Waddesdon, Buckinghamshire
- Gunnersbury Park – Ealing, London
- Halton House – Halton, Buckinghamshire
- Mentmore Towers – Mentmore, Buckinghamshire
- Spencer House – St James's, London (a leasehold extending until 2082 was purchased in 1986 from the Spencer family that owns the house)
- Tring Park Mansion – Tring, Hertfordshire
- Waddesdon Manor – Waddesdon, Buckinghamshire

== See also ==
- Rothschild family
- Rothschild & Co
- Rothschild banking family of Austria
- Rothschild banking family of France
- Rothschild banking family of Naples
