= Anthony Rothschild =

Anthony Rothschild may refer to:

- Sir Anthony de Rothschild, 1st Baronet (1810–1876), British financier
- Anthony Gustav de Rothschild (1887–1961), British banker
- Anthony James de Rothschild (born 1977), British businessman
