= Charlotte Henriette de Rothschild =

British soprano

Charlotte Henriette de Rothschild (born 28 November 1955) is a British soprano, specialising in the recital and oratorio repertoire, who is a member of the Rothschild banking family of England.

== Biography ==
The second daughter of the four children of Edmund Leopold de Rothschild (1916–2009) and Elizabeth Edith Rothschild née Lentner (1923–1980), she is a twin to David Lionel de Rothschild. In 1990 she married Nigel S. Brown. Her grandfather built the world-famous Exbury Gardens in Hampshire where she was raised. Noted for its cultivation of rhododendrons, a pink "Charlotte de Rothschild" was named for her.

== Education ==
Charlotte de Rothschild studied in Austria at the Universität Mozarteum Salzburg, and at the Royal College of Music in London where her uncle Leopold David de Rothschild has served as a Council Chairman. A global performer known for her works in Japan, she created a recital called "Family Connections" in which all the songs were composed by friends or teachers of her family during the past two centuries. The programme also includes compositions by her own ancestor, Mathilde Hannah von Rothschild (1832–1924).

== Career ==
Charlotte de Rothschild is currently signed to classical record label Nimbus Records. She has recorded works by Robert Schumann, Mathilde Hannah von Rothschild, Roger Quilter and Gabriel Fauré with accompanist Adrian Farmer. Nimbus Records have also issued two previously released albums by Charlotte de Rothschild; A Japanese Journey and Fairy Songs. A recital of songs of Norman Peterkin was released on Lyrita, and works by Gary Higginson on Regent.

In 2021 until 2022, Rothschild volunteered to work at a COVID-19 Vaccination centre in Hampshire.
