= N. M. Rothschild =

N. M. Rothschild may refer to:

- Nathan Mayer Rothschild
- Nathan Rothschild, 1st Baron Rothschild
- N M Rothschild & Sons

== See also ==
- Rothschild
