= Thomas Keens =

British politician and accountant

Sir Thomas Keens Kt DL

Member of Parliament for Aylesbury
- In office 6 December 1923 – 9 October 1924
- Preceded by: Lionel de Rothschild
- Succeeded by: Sir Alan Burgoyne

Personal details
- Born: 1870 Luton
- Died: 24 November 1953 (aged 82–83)

Sir Thomas Keens (1870 – 24 November 1953) was a British Liberal later National Liberal politician and accountant.

== Family and education ==
Keens was born in Luton, Bedfordshire the son of Thomas and Emma Keens (née Hailstone). He was educated privately in Luton and went into business in the town. He entered the accountancy profession, performing well in the examinations for the Incorporated Society of Accountants and the Chartered Institute of Secretaries and he was elected a Fellow of the Chartered Institute of Secretaries in 1897. In 1896 he had married Ella Batchelor of Great Missenden. They had two sons (one of whom died in 1950) and a daughter. In religion he was a Congregationalist.

== Business career ==
After a short spell in a solicitor's office and then in the office of the Official Receiver in Bankruptcy, London Suburban and Southern District, Keens set up his own accountancy business jointly with Mr A H J Shay and went on to hold the position of senior partner in Keens, Shay, Keens and Company, Incorporated Accountants with a headquarters in the city of London. He also had branches in Bedford, Aylesbury, Leighton Buzzard and Hitchin. He achieved some standing in his profession and was elected in 1926 to be President of the Society of Incorporated Accountants and Auditors, a position he held until 1929.

== Politics ==
Keens was first active in local politics, being elected a councillor for the Luton North Ward of Bedfordshire County Council in 1901. He held that seat until 1910. In 1919 he was made an Alderman and he remained a member of the Council until 1952, serving as Chairman of the Finance Committee and from 1935-52 as Chairman of the County Council. He was a Deputy Lieutenant of Bedfordshire and for a time was Chairman of the Lee Catchment (later Conservancy) Board, responsible for the waters of the River Lea. He also served as a Justice of the Peace. He became a Knight Bachelor in the New Year Honours List of 1934 for political and public services. Lady Keens was a strong supporter of her husband and in 1944 she became the first woman Mayor of Luton.

== Parliamentary politics ==
Keens first stood for election to Parliament at Aylesbury at the 1922 general election. In 1923 he stood again, this time winning, despite the intervention of a Labour candidate but in the following year's election he was beaten again. He tried to get back at Aylesbury at the 1929 general election again without success. During the crisis of 1931 which resulted in the formation of the National Government under Ramsay MacDonald, Keens favoured the Liberal Party's support of the coalition and sought election as National Liberal for Pontypool in the 1931 United Kingdom general election, but was unable to beat the sitting Labour MP, Thomas Griffiths. He never stood for Parliament again but chose to support publicly the National Conservative candidate Michael Beaumont at Aylesbury during the 1935 general election. Apparently Keens was disillusioned with the way the National Government and its Liberal National supporters under Sir John Simon was turning away from the traditional Liberal policy of Free Trade but he nevertheless preferred to give the Liberal Nationals general support and as the Liberal Party declined he turned in favour of Liberal-Conservative union, being a supporter of Dr Charles Hill and was for a while the leader of the Luton National Liberals. He died at his home, Highfield in Luton aged 83 years.

== See also ==
- List of Liberal Party (UK) MPs

Parliament of the United Kingdom
Preceded by Lionel Nathan de Rothschild	Member of Parliament for Aylesbury; 1923 – 1924	Succeeded by Sir Alan Hughes Burgoyne
