= Edmund Leopold de Rothschild =

English financier

- Born: 2 January 1916; London, England
- Died: 17 January 2009 (aged 93)
- Occupation: Financier
- Spouse: Elizabeth Edith Lentner (m. 1948)

Major Edmund Leopold de Rothschild CBE, TD (2 January 1916 – 17 January 2009) was an English financier, a member of the prominent Rothschild banking family of England, and a recipient of the Victoria Medal of Honour (VMH), given by the Royal Horticultural Society.

== Life and career ==
Born in Westminster, London, he was the second child and first son of Lionel Nathan de Rothschild and Marie Louise Eugénie de Rothschild née Beer. Known as Eddy de Rothschild, he was educated at Lockers Park School in Hertfordshire, Harrow School and Trinity College, Cambridge. Having travelled the world after university, he worked at N M Rothschild & Sons before joining the British Army at the outbreak of World War II. As a Royal Artillery officer in the Buckinghamshire Yeomanry, he served with the British Expeditionary Force in France, the North African Campaign and in Italy with the 77th Field (Highland) Regiment before becoming a major in the newly formed Jewish Brigade.

In May 1946 Rothschild was demobilised and once back home in England he returned to work at N M Rothschild & Sons. He became a partner, his father having died in 1942, but then had very little experience. Tutored by his uncle Anthony Gustav de Rothschild, he played a key role in the continuing success of the bank, and became its chairman from 1970 to 1975. An aggressive business developer, during his career Rothschild flew the Atlantic Ocean more than four hundred times playing a key role in developing British interests in postwar Japan and was a significant part of the Rothschild syndicate that formed the British Newfoundland Development Corporation to undertake mineral exploration in Labrador, Canada and to develop the Churchill Falls hydro-electric dam.

Over the years he was involved in a number of philanthropic causes and in recognition of his services, the New Year Honours 1997 made Rothschild a Commander of the Order of the British Empire. He was a trustee of, and generous benefactor to, the Royal Artillery Museum between 1991 and 1998. Still active into his nineties, he was President of the Association of Jewish Ex-Servicemen and Women (AJEX). In 1998, he appeared in the Chuck Olin documentary film titled In Our Own Hands that told the story of the only all-Jewish fighting force in World War II.

Like other members of the Rothschild family, he was an art collector, but the maintenance and development of the Exbury gardens was his most important pastime. From his father, Rothschild inherited Exbury Gardens in Hampshire which had fallen into severe disrepair as a result of the War, and he set about restoring the 200-acre (0.81 km^{2}) gardens. Edmund's expertise became such that in the 1950s and 1960s he served on the Council of the Royal Horticultural Society. In 2001, the American Rhododendron Society in Eugene, Oregon awarded him a citation in appreciation of his many services to the horticultural world. In 2005, the Royal Horticultural Society bestowed on him the Victoria Medal of Honour, the highest accolade in the British gardening world. Rothschild established a charitable trust to manage Exbury Gardens with which his children are involved.

In 1949 he published Window on the World, an account of his world tour of 1937–39. His autobiography was published in 1998.

== Private life ==
On 22 June 1948 Rothschild married Elizabeth Edith Lentner. The couple had the following children:

1. Katherine Juliette (b. 1949), who married Marcus Agius
2. Nicholas David (b. 1951)
3. David Lionel (b. 1955) (twin)
4. Charlotte Henriette (b. 1955) (twin)

Elizabeth Lentner de Rothschild died in 1980 and Edmund remarried in 1982 to Anne Kitching.

He died in 2009 at the age of 93.
