= Charlotte von Rothschild =

German-born British socialite (1819–1884)

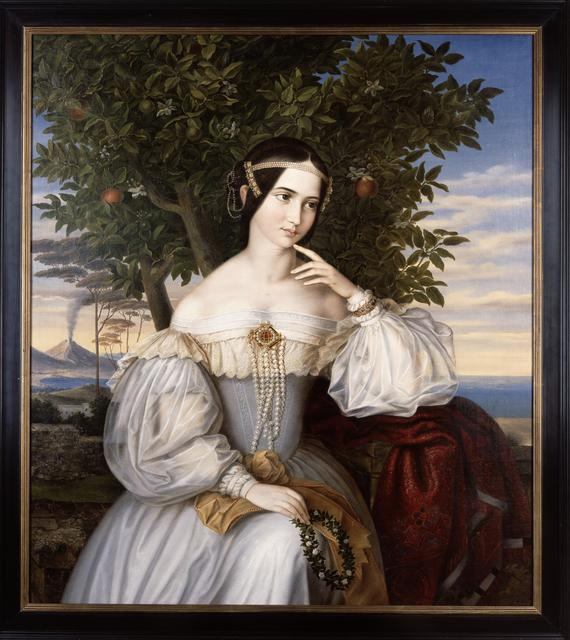
- Portrait by Moritz Daniel Oppenheim, 1836
- Born: 13 June 1819; Frankfurt, Germany
- Died: 13 March 1884 (aged 64); London, England
- Other name: 'The never-to-be-forgotten Baroness'
- Spouse: Lionel Freiherr de Rothschild (m. 1836)
- Children: 5, including Evelina, Nathan, Alfred, and Leopold
- Parent(s): Carl Mayer Freiherr von Rothschild and Adelheid Herz

Freifrau Charlotte von Rothschild (13 June 1819 – 13 March 1884) was a German-born British socialite. She was a member of the Rothschild banking family of Naples.

== Family ==
Rothschild was born into the well known Jewish banking family, the Rothschilds. She was the eldest child and only daughter of Carl Mayer Freiherr von Rothschild and Adelheid Herz.

She was born in Frankfurt am Main, Germany on 13 June 1819. Both her parents were Jewish.

== Marriage ==
Because endogamy within the Rothschild family was an essential part of their strategy to ensure that control of their wealth remained in family hands, on 15 June 1836, two days after her seventeenth birthday, Rothschild married Lionel Freiherr de Rothschild (1808–1879), her first cousin from the English branch of the family. They had the following children:

1. Leonora (1837–1911)
2. Evelina (1839–1866)
3. Nathan Mayer (1840–1915)
4. Alfred Charles (1842–1918)
5. Leopold (1845–1917)

The couple maintained residences at 148 Piccadilly and Gunnersbury Park in London where, in the tradition of the English family, she used the style "de" Rothschild. Rothschild's arranged marriage flourished for 43 years based on great love and mutual respect. In an era when male and female roles were clearly defined, Charlotte had been better educated in art than her husband and would be instrumental in most of their art assemblage.

In 1858, her husband became the first unconverted Jew to sit in the British House of Commons. Charlotte Freifrau de Rothschild became one of England's most prominent socialites whose dinner invitations, according to biographer Stanley Weintraub, were favoured over those from Buckingham Palace.

In 1844, the Freifrau caused a sensation in London society when the American showman P. T. Barnum and his celebrated midget "Tom Thumb" performed at her home. However, beyond socializing and entertaining, Charlotte von Rothschild was a dedicated patron of numerous charities with a special interest in education.

== Death ==
Rothschild died at her Gunnersbury Park home on 13 March 1884 and was buried next to her husband in the Willesden Jewish Cemetery. Following her death, her eldest son named a newly constructed block of housing for low-income persons "Charlotte's Buildings."

== See also ==
- Rothschild banking family of England
