= Society of Incorporated Accountants =

The Society of Incorporated Accountants, founded in 1885 as the Society of Accountants, was a professional association of accountants in England. It was known from 1908 to 1954 as the Society of Incorporated Accountants and Auditors, and from 1954 to 1957 as the Society of Incorporated Accountants.

== History ==
The Society of Accountants was established in 1885, initially in reaction to the restrictive practices of the Institute of Chartered Accountants in England and Wales (ICAEW), founded in 1880. Members were known as 'Incorporated Accountants'. Initially, members were mainly elected by the Society's Council, but in 1889 examinations were introduced and the Society established itself as an examining body.

In 1889 the Society began publishing a quarterly journal Incorporated Accountants' Journal, which became a monthly in 1895 and was renamed Accountancy in 1938. After the merger with ICAEW in 1957 Accountancy became the journal of the ICAEW. The Society was housed at Two Temple Place (Incorporated Accountants' Hall) from 1928 to 1957. In 1959 the building was sold by ICAEW.

== Presidents ==
- Charles Henry Wilson (1902), of Leeds
- Charles Hewetson Nelson (1913-1916)
- Thomas Keens (1926–29)
- Bertram Nelson (1954-1956)

== Arms ==
Coat of arms of Society of Incorporated Accountants
Crest On a wreath of the colours a demi figure of a scribe Proper habited Sable holding in the dexter hand a pen and in the sinister an inkhorn also Proper. Escutcheon Argent an open book issuant from the dexter chief a sunburst Proper all within a bordure Sable charged with six bezants and six plates alternately. Motto Fides Atque Integritas
