= Lockers Park School =

Location
- Lockers Park Lane; Hemel Hempstead, Hertfordshire, HP1 1TL; England

Information
- Type: Preparatory and Pre-Preparatory
- Religious affiliation: Church of England
- Established: 1874
- Founder: Henry Montagu Draper
- Local authority: Hertfordshire
- Trust: Lockers Park School Trust Ltd
- Department for Education URN: 117611 Tables
- Chair of governors: Chris Lister
- Headmaster: Gavin Taylor
- Gender: Boys only prep and pre-prep
- Age: 4 to 13
- Enrolment: 170
- Website: https://www.lockerspark.co.uk

Lockers Park School is a day and boarding preparatory and pre-preparatory school for boys, situated in 23 acres of countryside in Boxmoor, Hertfordshire. Its headmaster is Gavin Taylor.

== History ==
Lockers Park was founded in 1872 by Henry Montagu Draper, an old boy of Rugby School. It moved to purpose-built buildings and sports fields in 1874 in 23 acres (93,000 m^{2}) of the parkland which surrounds a Georgian country house called Lockers or The Lockers, which was once the home of Ebenezer John Collett. The new school was designed by Sidney Scott and has its own chapel which dates from the same era.

In the 1940s and 1950s, the veteran England all-round cricketer Frank Woolley (1887–1978) was the school's cricket coach.

In January 2026, it was announced that Lockers Park School had agreed to enter into a partnership with Harrow School where each school will maintain their separate and distinctive identities, building on the strengths, traditions and heritage of each school.

== Former pupils ==
See also Category: People educated at Lockers Park School

The list of distinguished (or well-known) old boys of Lockers Park includes the following:

- Alastair Aird (1931–2009), Queen Elizabeth the Queen Mother's private secretary
- Ronnie Aird first-class cricketer and President of the Marylebone Cricket Club (MCC)
- Prince Alemayehu (1861–1879), son of the emperor of Ethiopia
- Timothy Bateson (1926–2009), actor
- Prince Maurice of Battenberg, member of the Hesse aristocracy
- Roy Beddington, artist
- Anthony Berry, British Conservative politician
- Richard Budgett, Olympic Gold Medalist
- Guy Burgess (1911–1963), MI6 agent and Soviet spy
- John Dermot Campbell (1898–1945), Ulster Unionist politician
- Kenneth Carlisle, Conservative politician and former Lord Commissioner of the Treasury
- Martin Cecil, 7th Marquess of Exeter, Anglo-Canadian peer
- Paul Channon, Baron Kelvedon (1935–2007), Conservative politician
- Martin Charteris, Baron Charteris of Amisfield (1913–1999), Queen Elizabeth II's private secretary, Provost of Eton College
- James Dunbar-Nasmith (1927–2023), architect
- William Ehrman, British diplomat and former chairman of the Joint Intelligence Committee
- Stuart Hampshire, philosopher
- Basil Henriques (1890–1961), philanthropist
- Robert Henriques (1905–1967), writer and broadcaster
- Stanley Jackson, cricket captain of England, politician
- Edward James (1907–1984), poet
- Keith Joseph, Conservative politician
- Clive Loehnis, Director of GCHQ
- Mansoor Ali Khan Pataudi, captain of the Indian cricket team
- Saif Ali Khan, Indian film actor and titular Nawab of Pataudi
- Robert Laycock, major-general, commando general during the Second World War
- Guy Mansfield, 6th Baron Sandhurst, British barrister, hereditary peer and Conservative member of the House of Lords
- Edwin Mayfield, British Lions rugby union forward
- Nathaniel Micklem, British Liberal Party politician and lawyer
- James Lees-Milne, architectural historian
- Tom Mitford, brother of the Mitford Sisters
- Louis Mountbatten, 1st Earl Mountbatten of Burma, last Viceroy of India
- Edmund Leopold de Rothschild (1916–2009), banker and horticulturalist
- Leopold David de Rothschild (1927–2012), banker, musician and philanthropist
- James Stevenson-Hamilton, first warden of Kruger National Park
- Basil Hamilton-Temple-Blackwood, 4th Marquess of Dufferin and Ava (1909–1945), Conservative politician
- Bryan Valentine, cricket captain of Kent
- Arthur Waley, orientalist and Member of the Order of the Companions of Honour
- Peter Watson, (1908–1956), patron of the arts
- Hugo Williams, poet, journalist and travel writer
