= Halton House =

Country house in Chiltern Hills, Buckinghamshire, England

Coordinates: 51°46′52.92″N 0°43′35.06″W

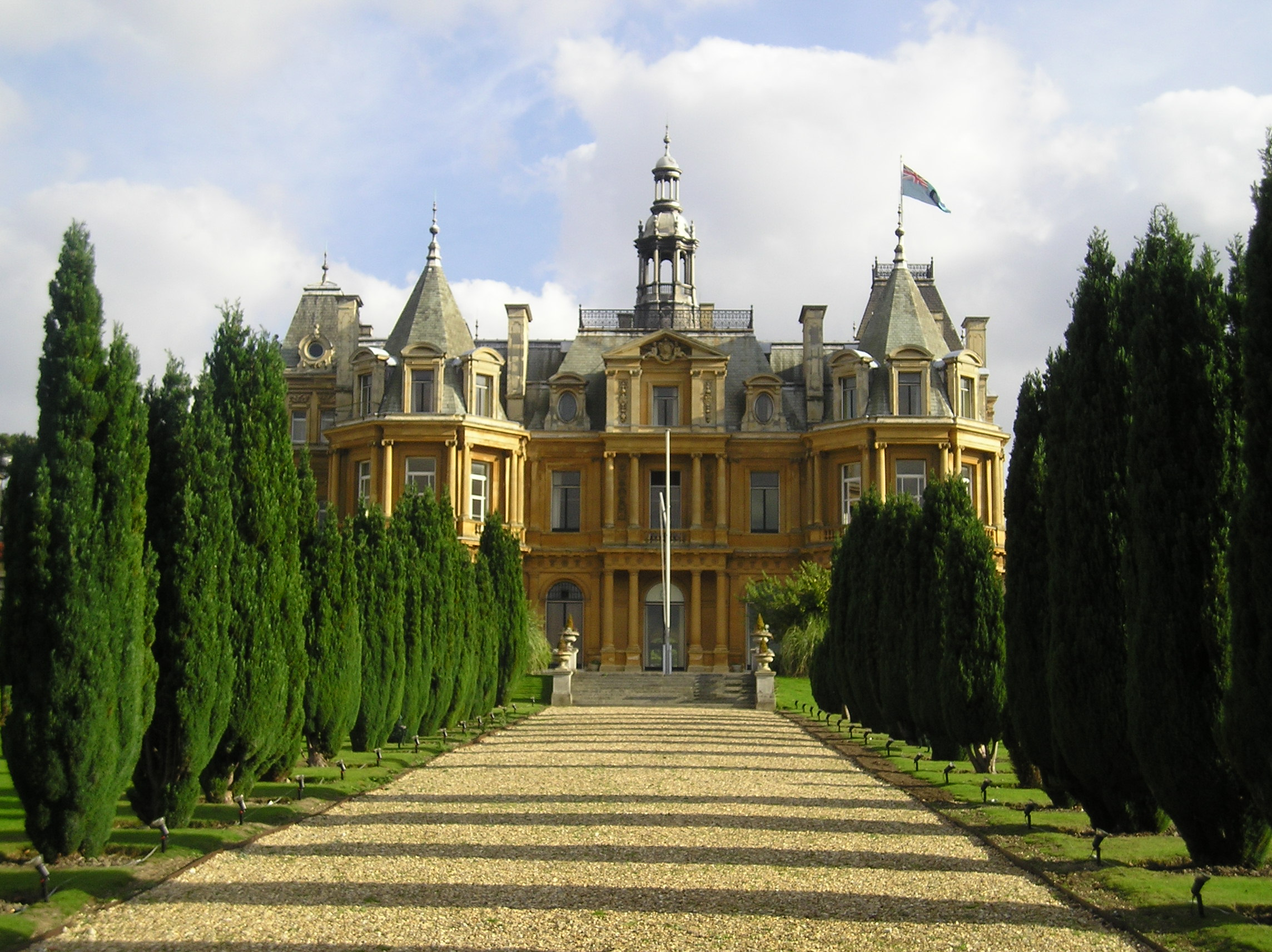
Halton House, Buckinghamshire

Halton House was a country house in the Chiltern Hills above the village of Halton in Buckinghamshire, England. It was built for Alfred Freiherr de Rothschild between 1880 and 1883. It was used as the main officers' mess for RAF Halton and is listed Grade II* on the National Heritage List for England.

== History ==
There has been a manor house at Halton since the Norman Conquest, when it belonged to the Archbishop of Canterbury. Thomas Cranmer sold the manor to Henry Bradshaw, Solicitor-General in the mid-16th century. After remaining in the Bradshaw family for some considerable time, it was sold to Sir Francis Dashwood in 1720 and was then held in the Dashwood family for almost 150 years.

The site of the old Halton House, or Manor, was west of the church in Halton village. It had a large park, which was later bisected by the Grand Union Canal. In June 1849, Sir George Dashwood auctioned the contents and, in 1853, the estate was sold to Lionel Freiherr de Rothschild.

Lionel then left the estate to his son Alfred Freiherr de Rothschild in 1879. At this time the estate covered an approximately 1,500-acre (610-hectare) triangle between Wendover, Aston Clinton, and Weston Turville.

== Construction ==
It is thought the architect was William R. Rodriguez (also known as Rogers), who worked in the design team of William Cubitt and Company, the firm commissioned to build and oversee the project in 1880. Just three years later, the house was finished.

The house was widely criticised by members of the establishment. The architect Eustace Balfour, a nephew of the Marquess of Salisbury, described it as a "combination of French Chateau and gambling house", and one of Gladstone's private secretaries called it an "exaggerated nightmare".

== Sale to RAF ==
At Halton, all were entertained by Alfred Freiherr de Rothschild. However, Halton's glittering life lasted less than thirty years, with the last party being in 1914 at the outbreak of World War I. Devastated by the carnage of the war, Freiherr de Rothschild's health began to fail and he died in 1918. Alfred had no legitimate children, so the house was bequeathed to his nephew Lionel Nathan de Rothschild. He detested the place and sold the contents at auction in 1918. The house and by now diminished estate were purchased for the Royal Air Force by the Air Ministry for what was even then a low price of £115,000 (equivalent to £5.65 million in 2025 pounds).

Following a structural survey of Halton House carried out in January 2025, a major defect was identified with officers and staff given 30 minutes to vacate the building which has remained closed and sealed since that time. It has been reported that the manor house will remain closed permanently and subsequently disposed of through the Defence Infrastructure Organisation.

== Officers' Mess ==
Shortly after the RAF acquired the Halton estate, the house became RAF Halton's officers' mess. On 1 January 1920, RAF Halton was upgraded to a command and the headquarters element moved into Halton House. Although the House no longer functions as a headquarters, it remained an officers mess until 2025. A new dining room was built at the rear of the servants' wing of the house in the 1960s.

== Architecture ==
For the style of the house, Alfred was probably influenced by that of plans for the nearly completed Waddesdon Manor, the home of Baron Ferdinand de Rothschild, his brother-in law. While not so large there is a resemblance, but other continental influences appear to have crept in: classical pediments jut from mansard roofs, spires and gables jostle for attention, and the whole is surmounted by a cupola. The front of the house features a porte-cochère. A Rothschild cousin described it as: "looking like a giant wedding cake".

If the outside was extravagant, the interior was no anti-climax. The central hall (not unlike the galleried two-storey hall at Mentmore Towers) was furnished as the "grand salon". Two further drawing rooms (the east and west) continued the luxurious theme. The dining and billiards rooms too were furnished with 18th-century panelling and boiseries. The theme continued up the grand, plaster panelled staircase to the bedrooms. The whole was furnished in what became known as "Le Style Rothschild", that is, 18th-century French furniture, boulle, ebony, and ormolu, complemented by Old Masters and fine porcelain.

A huge domed conservatory known as the winter garden was attached to the house.

== In media ==
Halton House is also used frequently as a film set and is often seen in cinemas and on televisions around the world. It has been featured in:

- Jeeves and Wooster (Series 3, Episode 1 "Bertie Sets Sail" – 1992)
- Evita (1996 musical film based on the life of Eva Perón)
- The World Is Not Enough (1999 James Bond film)
- An Ideal Husband (1999 film based on the play by Oscar Wilde)
- What a Girl Wants (2003 film)
- Bride and Prejudice (2004 Bollywood-style film adaptation of Jane Austen's 1813 novel)
- The Queen (2006 film)
- Flyboys (2006 film)
- Diana: Last Days of a Princess (2007 docudrama)
- The King's Speech (2010 historical drama)
- Downton Abbey (Series 2, Episode 6 - 2011). The interior only was used as "Haxby Park", home of Sir Richard Carlisle, a suitor of Lady Mary Crawley during Season 2.
- Agatha Christie's Poirot (Series 13, Episode 4 The Labours of Hercules 2013). Exterior, main hall, dining room and terrace, used as a Swiss hotel in the Alps.
- Endeavour episode 2 series 2
- The Crown (2016) Season 1 Episode 5 "Smoke And Mirrors" As the French home of the Duke and Duchess of Windsor and as the interior of the Hôtel Ritz Paris.
- Bridgerton (2020) Used as the interior of the Bridgerton House in London
- Enola Holmes (film) (2020) Used for the Lyon's ball scene and where Enola is arrested in front of Tewkesbury
- Cruella (film) (2021) Used as the interior of Baroness' first Party where the champagne glasses fell

== See also ==
- Rothschild properties in England
