= Bertram Nelson =

Bertram Nelson CBE (1905–1984) was a senior partner at Lithgow Nelson & Co and as President of the Society of Incorporated Accountants played a leading role in its amalgamation with the ICAEW in 1957. His wide variety of roles reflected his interest in supporting the development of the accountancy profession as well as business, education and the arts in Liverpool :

- Honorary Secretary of the Merseyside Civic Society (1938-1953)
- Member of BBC North Regional Council (1947-1957)
- Director of the Liverpool Playhouse (1949-1963)
- Chairman of the Liverpool Chamber of Commerce (1951-1953)
- Chairman of the Liverpool Youth Welfare Advisory Committee (1952-1965)
- Director of Liverpool Exchange Newsroom Company (1956)
- Member of the Mersey Docks and Harbour Board (1951-1965)
- President of the Liverpool Athenaeum (1962)
- Senior Pro-Chancellor, Liverpool University (1967-1973)
- Member of Merseyside and North Wales Electricity Board (1967 - 1976)
- Chairman of the Liverpool Daily Post and Echo PLC (1972-1976)
- Chairman Wirral Estates PLC (1980-1983)

At a national level his roles included :

- Member of the Society of Incorporated Accountants Council (1937-1957)
- President of the Society of Incorporated Accountants (1954-1956)
- Secretary of the Overall Manufacturers Association (1940 - 1982)
- Member of the Board of Trade Consultative Committee on Companies (1954-1973)
- Vice President of the British Chamber of Commerce (1956)
- Treasurer of the Committee of the Export Credit Guarantee Department (1958)
- Member of the Institute of Chartered Accountants in England and Wales Council (1957-1975)

He married Eleanor Kinsey in June, 1954. He was made a CBE in the 1956 New Year Honours.

== Publications ==
He was author of Nelson's Tables: Company Procedure : Bankruptcy and Deeds of Arrangement first published in 1933. The eleventh and final edition of this book was published in 1990 ISBN 978-085-121692-8.
