= Geoffrey Rothschild =

South African businessman (born 1947)

Geoffrey Rothschild (born 1947) is a South African businessman. He is the former chairman of JSE Limited.

== Early life ==
Geoffrey Rothschild was born on March 20, 1947, in Johannesburg, South Africa. He graduated from the University of the Witwatersrand, qualifying as a C.A. in 1970.

== Career ==
Rothschild started his career at JSE Limited in the 1960s. He served on its board of directors from 2000 to 2008. He was its Director of Corporate Marketing & Communications. He also served as its Chairman. He then served as the Head of Government and International Affairs at JSE. He opened the market on 23 March 2015, when he retired.

He served on the board of directors of Sasfin Frankel Pollak Securities. He is a member of the National Advisory Council for Innovation and the South African Institute of Stockbrokers. He serves on the Board of Directors of the NEPAD Business Foundation.

== Personal life ==
He resides in Gauteng, South Africa.

== See also ==
- Nicky Newton-King, CEO the JSE
