= Norman Peterkin =

English composer and music publisher

George Norman Peterkin (Liverpool, 21 December 1886 – Guildford, 15 December 1982) was an English composer and music publisher. He is perhaps best known today for his brief song "I heard a piper piping".

Peterkin was born in Liverpool and was mostly self-taught in music. He started work with the local organ builder Rushworth & Dreaper in the late 1900s, moving to their Singapore office in 1911, and later to Hong Kong. While there he established himself as a pianist and also began to compose, much influenced by Cyril Scott. He returned to England in 1918.

In 1924 he became second-in-command to Hubert Foss at the Oxford University Press Music Department (which had published some of his songs), taking over as head of department when Foss resigned in 1941. The strain of keeping things going almost alone throughout the war exhausted him, and he asked for early retirement at the end of 1947. He was succeeded at OUP by Alan Frank.

As a composer, Peterkin wrote mostly songs and a few short piano pieces, such as the suites Dreamer's Tales (1918), Betel-Jade-Ivory (1920) and Centaurs. A Rhapsody for violin (or oboe) and piano was published by OUP in 1926. Most of his works were composed during his stay abroad, on his return to Liverpool in the early 1920s and then on to London. His contemporaries there were Peter Warlock and Bernard van Dieren. He also became friendly with Kaikhosru Sorabji and Elizabeth Poston, whom he encouraged. Sorabji dedicated four of his works to Peterkin.

His best known song, 'I Heard a Piper Piping', is a setting of words by Seumas O'Sullivan, the pen name of poet James Starkey (1879-1958). Peterkin also wrote a number of songs setting words by his wife Marie (née Lang; died 1960).

== Recordings ==
- The Songs of Norman Peterkin Charlotte de Rothschild (soprano), Adrian Farmer (piano) Lyrita Records

== See also ==
- Klemm, Gustav.Norman Peterkin: The Man and his Music, in Monthly Musical Record, 1933.
- Chisholm, Alastair. A tribute to Norman Peterkin, 1982.
- Scores at IMSLP
