= Leopold David de Rothschild =

British financier (1927–2012)

- Born: 12 May 1927
- Died: 19 April 2012 (aged 84)
- Occupations: Financier, musician

Leopold David de Rothschild, CBE, FRCM (12 May 1927 – 19 April 2012) was a British financier, musician, and a member of the Rothschild banking family of England.

Leopold David was the fourth and youngest child and second son of Lionel Nathan de Rothschild (1882–1942) and Marie Louise Eugénie Beer (1892–1975). Like his elder brother, Edmund Leopold de Rothschild, Leopold was educated at Lockers Park School in Hertfordshire, Harrow School and Trinity College, Cambridge.

From childhood he had a fondness for music and became an accomplished pianist and violinist. As a vocalist, he sang with The Bach Choir of London for many years and would later serve as its president. While in his teens, he joined the Royal Navy, serving for two years. He went to work at Kuhn, Loeb & Co., as well as at Morgan Stanley and Glyn, Mills & Co. before becoming a partner at his family's N M Rothschild & Sons in 1956.

While he had a long and successful career in banking, his love of music and the arts played an important role in his life. He was an honorary member of the Incorporated Society of Musicians, among his many involvements, Leopold de Rothschild served as:

- Music Advisory Committee of the British Council — Chairman
- English Chamber Orchestra — President
- Glyndebourne Arts Trust — Trustee
- Jewish Music Institute, School of Oriental and African Studies (SOAS), University of London — Co-president
- Royal College of Music — Council Chairman and Independent adviser
- Voices Foundation — founding member, and a member of the Consultative Council
- Countess of Munster Musical Trust — Chairman
- Wendover Choral Society; President from May 2009
- Trustee of the National Museum of Science and Industry [Science Museum], London and the National Railway Museum, York
- Tring Park School for the Performing Arts — President
- Member of the Court of the Bank of England

Among his philanthropic works, through his "Leopold de Rothschild Charitable Trust" he contributed to numerous charities, including the St John's Hospice for the terminally ill. In addition, his Charitable Trust provides support to the London Symphony Orchestra, the London Sinfonietta, the Rambert Dance Company, and provides scholarships for students to study at the Royal College of Music of which he was a Fellow (FRCM) and past Council Chairman.
