= Evelyn de Rothschild =

British financier (1931–2022)

Sir Evelyn de Rothschild FKC
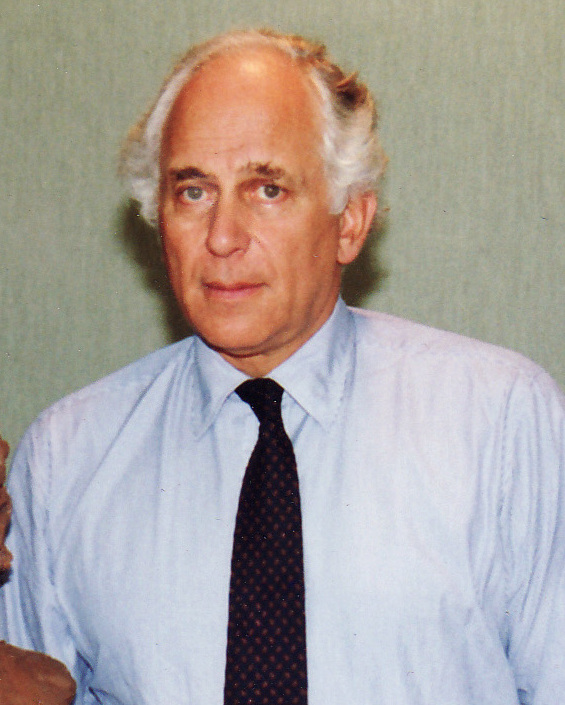
- Born: Evelyn Robert Adrian de Rothschild; 29 August 1931; Mayfair, London, England
- Died: 7 November 2022 (aged 91); Chelsea, London, England
- Education: Trinity College, Cambridge
- Spouses: Jeannette Bishop (m. 1966; div. 1971); Victoria Lou Schott (m. 1973; div. 2000); Lynn Forester (m. 2000)
- Children: 3, including Anthony James and David Mayer
- Father: Anthony Gustav de Rothschild

Sir Evelyn Robert Adrian de Rothschild FKC (29 August 1931 – 7 November 2022) was a British financier and a member of the Rothschild family.

== Early life and education ==
Evelyn de Rothschild was born in Mayfair, London on 29 August 1931, to a Jewish family. The son of Anthony Gustav de Rothschild (1887–1961) and Yvonne Lydia Louise Cahen d'Anvers (1899–1977), he was named after his uncle Evelyn Achille de Rothschild who was killed in action in World War I. Evelyn de Rothschild spent several of his boyhood years in the United States during World War II. He was a pupil at Harrow School and then studied history at Trinity College, Cambridge, but dropped out before gaining a degree. Born into great wealth, he became one of England's most eligible bachelors, spending his youth travelling, socialising, driving exotic sports cars, enjoying thoroughbred horse racing and playing polo. It was not until age 26 that he decided to join N M Rothschild & Sons banking house to be trained in the family's business. In 1955, a couple of years prior to Sir Evelyn's entry into the family's business, his father had to retire from the position of chairman due to illness and his cousin Victor Rothschild took over as chairman.

== Career ==
Evelyn de Rothschild was appointed a director of Paris-based de Rothschild Frères in 1968 while Guy de Rothschild from the French branch of the family became a partner at N M Rothschild & Sons. In 1976, he took over as bank chairman from Victor Rothschild and in 1982 became chairman of Rothschilds Continuation Holdings AG, the co-ordinating company for the merchant banking group.

He became co-chairman of Rothschild Bank A.G., Zurich in 1994, serving until 2003 when he oversaw the merger of the family's French and UK houses. David René de Rothschild of the French branch took over as executive chairman of Rothschild International after the different branches had been merged and Sir Evelyn continued as non-executive chairman of N M Rothschild & Sons.

In 2003, he founded with his third wife, Lynn Forester de Rothschild, a holding company, E.L. Rothschild, to manage their investments in The Economist and various enterprises in India. de Rothschild was removed from Rothschild & Co's banking activities in 2004 following an investigation into a sexual misconduct allegation.

Throughout his career, Evelyn de Rothschild was actively involved in a number of other organisations in both the private and public sectors and held the following business positions:

- Deputy Chairman – Milton Keynes Development Corporation (1971–1984)
- Chairman – The Economist (1972–1989)
- Director – IBM United Kingdom Holdings Limited (1972–1995)
- Chairman – United Racecourses (1977–1994)
- Director – De Beers Consolidated Mines (1977–1994)
- Chairman – British Merchant Banking & Securities House Association (1985–1989)

Evelyn de Rothschild also served as a director of the newspaper group owned by Lord Beaverbrook. Years later, he served for a time as a director of Lord Black's Daily Telegraph newspaper. An owner of thoroughbred racehorses, he was a past chairman of United Racecourses.

== Philanthropic activities ==
In 1967, de Rothschild created the Eranda Foundation to support social welfare, promote the arts and to encourage research into medicine and education.

De Rothschild served as Queen Elizabeth II's financial adviser. He was a governor of the London School of Economics and Political Science as well as an active patron of the arts and supporter of a number of charities. He served as chairman of the Delegacy of St Mary's Hospital Medical School from 1977 to 1988. He was a Member of the Council of the Royal Academy of Dramatic Art, a trustee of the Shakespeare Globe Trust, and in 1998 was appointed Chairman of The Princess Royal Trust for Carers. Sir Evelyn was the founding chairman in 1990 of The European Association for Banking and Financial History in Frankfurt, Germany, a position he held until retiring in 2004. He was a board member of the Snowdon Trust, founded by the Earl of Snowdon, which provides grants and scholarships for students with disabilities.

== Personal life and death ==
In 1966, Evelyn de Rothschild married Jeannette Bishop, a niece of Sir Stanley Hooker, the jet-engine engineer. The marriage ended in divorce in 1971. Jeannette Bishop died in late 1980 or during 1981 along with former family cook and interpreter Gabriella Guerin. The two were allegedly killed.

Rothschild married for a second time in 1973 to Victoria Lou Schott (1949–2021), the daughter of Florida property developer Lewis Schott and his wife Marcia W. Schott (née Whitney). The marriage, which ended in divorce in 2000, produced three children:

- Jessica de Rothschild (5 June 1974) – British-based theatre director. Married British-American film director Sacha Gervasi in 2010
- Anthony James de Rothschild (30 January 1977) – married Danish model and UK TV presenter Tania Strecker in 2006.
- David Mayer de Rothschild (25 August 1978).

On 30 November 2000, Rothschild married the American lawyer and entrepreneur Lynn Forester, who was the head of the Luxembourg-based wireless broadband venture FirstMark Communications Europe and the former wife of Andrew Stein, a New York City political figure who served as the last president of the New York City Council. By this marriage, he has two stepchildren, Benjamin Forester Stein (b. 1985) and John Forester Stein (b. 1988). On the announcement of the marriage, the de Rothschild couple were invited to spend their honeymoon at the White House, where they agreed to stay one night.

He owned homes in London, New York City, Martha's Vineyard, and Buckinghamshire, where he lived at Ascott House, a country estate owned by the National Trust.

After suffering a stroke, Rothschild died from COVID-19 and pneumonia at his home in Chelsea, London, on 7 November 2022, aged 91.

== Posthumous sexual harassment and assault allegations ==
In 2025, de Rothschild was posthumously accused of sexual harassment and assault by multiple women. These events were alleged to have occurred during the 1990s. According to The Guardian "sources alleged that [de Rothschild] would 'take his pick' of junior staff at the bank and shower them with attention before behaving inappropriately towards them." Additionally, "The claims include serious sexual assaults. One included a violent assault of a member of staff when she was a young woman working for him. Another allegation is that he put his hands down a different woman's top and under her underwear to grope her. And a third woman claimed she was forced to perform a sex act on him while he sat on his desk."

== Honours ==
Evelyn de Rothschild was appointed a Knight Bachelor in the 1989 New Year Honours.
