= Halton, Buckinghamshire =

Village in Buckinghamshire, England

Coordinates: 51.78307°N 0.73388°W

Halton
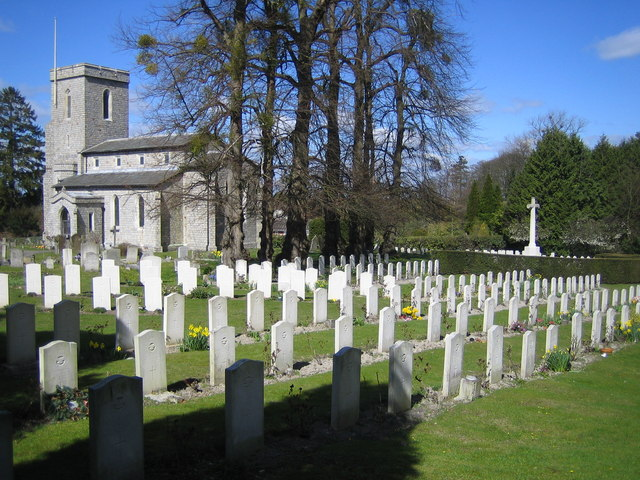
- St Michael and All Angels Church, Halton

- Location within Buckinghamshire
- Population: 935 (2011 Census)
- OS grid reference: SP874101
- Civil parish: Halton
- Unitary authority: Buckinghamshire
- Ceremonial county: Buckinghamshire
- Region: South East
- Country: England
- Sovereign state: United Kingdom
- Post town: AYLESBURY
- Postcode district: HP22
- Dialling code: 01296
- Police: Thames Valley
- Fire: Buckinghamshire
- Ambulance: South Central
- UK Parliament: Mid Buckinghamshire

Halton is a small village and civil parish in the Buckinghamshire district of the ceremonial county of Buckinghamshire, England, located about two miles north of Wendover and five miles southeast of Aylesbury.

== History and development ==
Medieval Halton was held by the monastery of Christchurch, Canterbury, along with Monks Risborough, and after the English Reformation, passed to the Bradshawe family of Wendover and later to the Fermor family. In 1720, James Fermor sold the estate to Sir Francis Dashwood of West Wycombe. It remained in the Dashwood's ownership until Baron Lionel de Rothschild acquired the estate in 1851.

In the Chiltern Hills above Halton is Halton House, a country house built in the Château Style, which was used as the main Officers' Mess for RAF Halton until 2025. It was originally built for Alfred de Rothschild in 1880. The RAF demolished its domed winter garden to build an accommodation block.

Halton lies just outside the Metropolitan Green Belt so it has not been protected from postwar housing development. At its southern end it is contiguous with Wendover, but it retains a separate, older village centre anchored by St Michael & All Angels Church, which dates from 1813, built on the site of a 16th-century church, and a community hall. There is a separate, modern Catholic Church.

The Parish also includes RAF Halton, a Royal Air Force (RAF) training station with a grass airfield used for glider training. Most modern housing in the village was built for RAF personnel, but some is now in private hands. A small shop mainly serves the RAF community. The base had a large military hospital employing hundreds of people, which was closed in 1995. The buildings remained until 2007/8 when they were demolished for the Princess Mary Gate housing scheme on land between Halton and Wendover.

== Church of St Michael and All Angels ==
The present Church of England parish church was funded by the Dashwood family and built in 1813 to the design of Henry Rhodes (1779-1846) in the style of the late 12th century. Built of sarsen blocks, with the mortar decorated with small flint chippings, a technique known as galleting. It has a west tower for four bells dated 1814. In 1886-87 the church was restored with addition of the aisles and a remodelled chancel. Some monuments have been preserved from the old church, including a brass for Henry Bradschaw, who died in 1553. It's a Grade II listed building.

=== Commonwealth War Graves ===
The churchyard at St Michael's has been used for airmen's burials since 1917. Some 20 graves date from the First World War and nearly 90 from the Second. There is a Cross of Sacrifice in the main part of the churchyard, which is in the care of the Commonwealth War Graves Commission.

== Facilities ==
Halton Community Combined School is a mixed primary school, which takes children from the age of four through to the age of eleven. The school has 200 pupils, with many from Forces backgrounds. In November 2023 the school was judged 'good' overall by OFSTED. The school also contains Halton Preschool, which takes children aged 2 to 4.

The Halton Tennis Centre has a small number of future athletes combining competitive tennis training with home schooling. The centre was formerly run by the RAF, who still train there.

== Transport ==
The nearest railway station is Wendover, on the Chiltern Railways line between Aylesbury and London Marylebone (via Amersham). Journey times to London are under an hour. A single track railway line used to run from Halton, crossing the A413 by way of a level crossing, to a bay platform at the north end of Wendover station.

Route 8 is served by Arriva and is a bus from and to the Main Point at RAF Halton.

The Wendover arm of the Grand Union Canal flows through Halton on its course from Wendover to join the Grand Union beside Marsworth lock near Tring.

== Popular culture ==
Halton gave its name to the Handley Page Halton, a cargo version of the Halifax bomber.

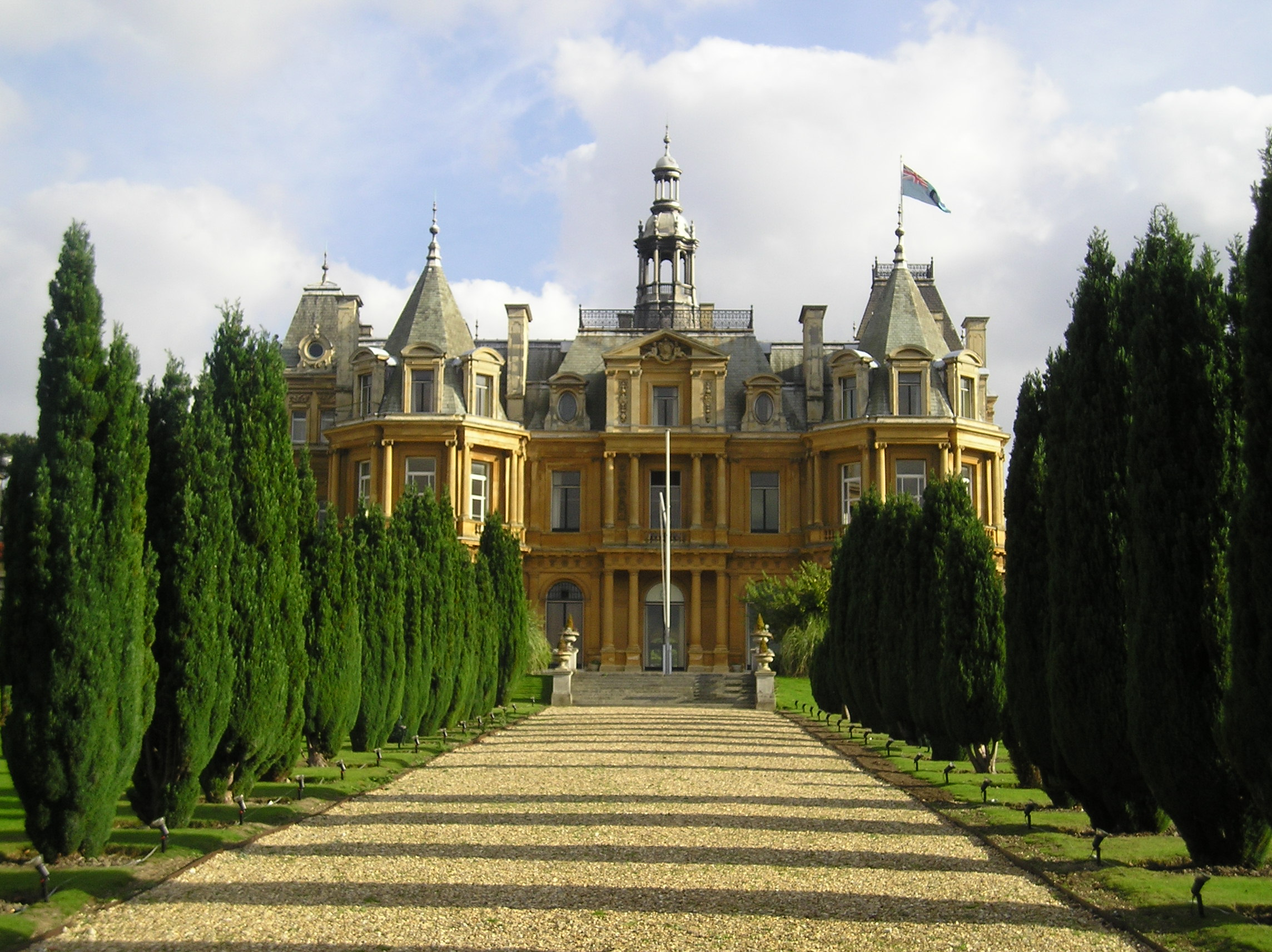
Halton House

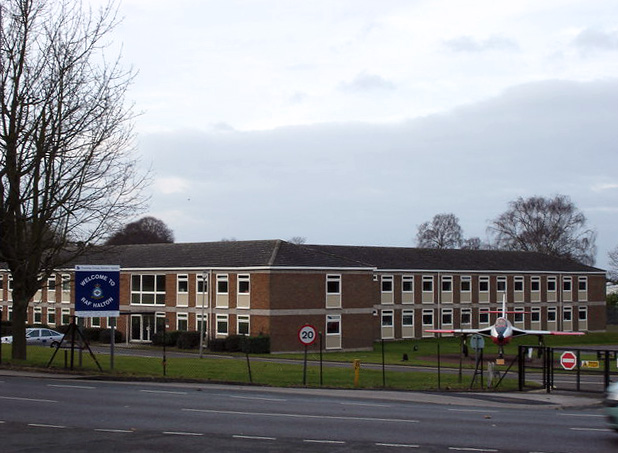
RAF Halton

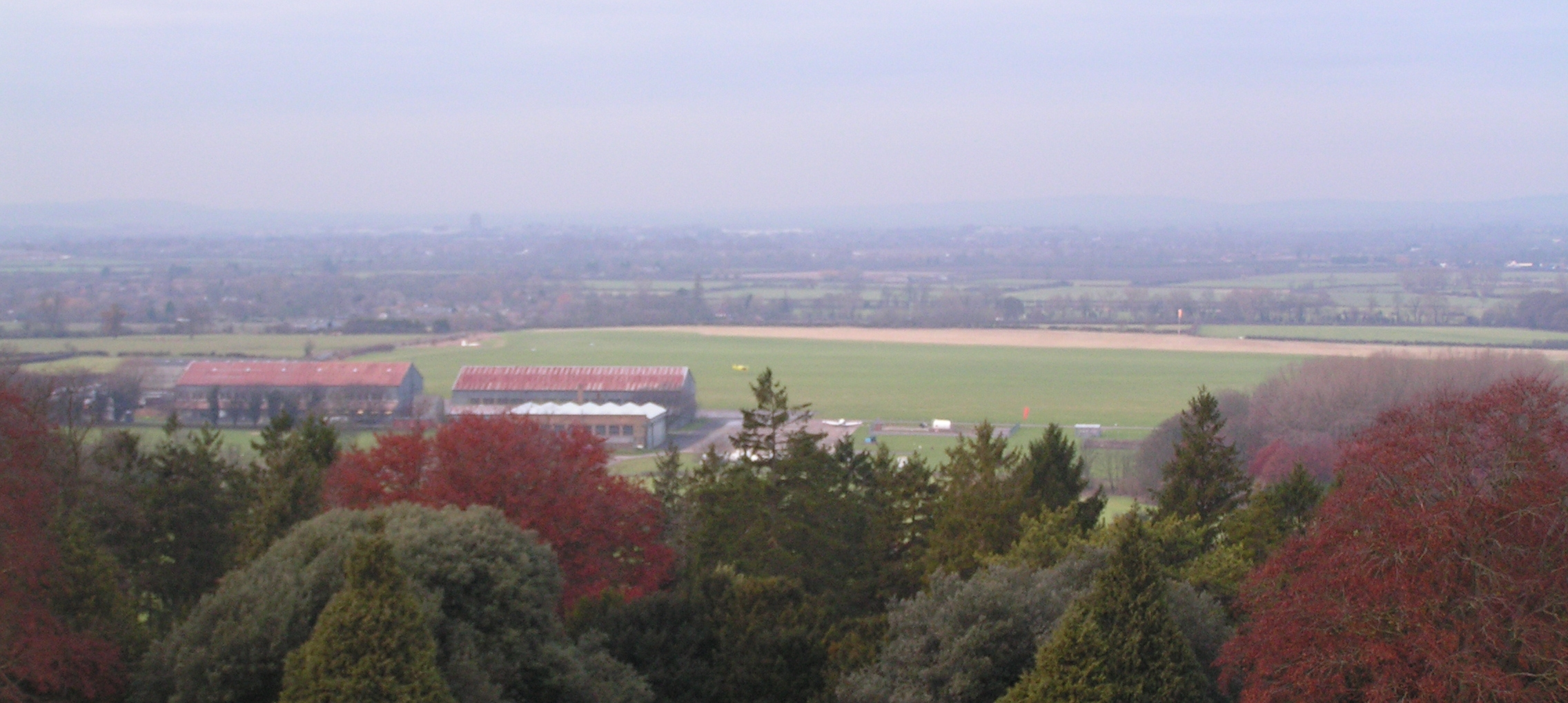
Halton Airfield

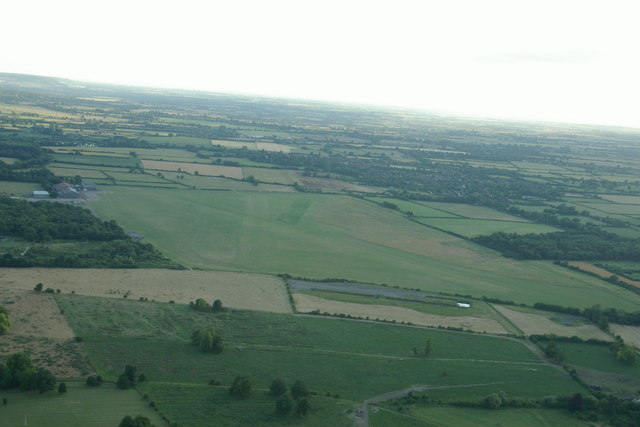
Aerial view of RAF Halton
