= Adrian Farmer =

Australian rules footballer

Personal information
- Full name: Adrian Ward Farmer
- Born: 14 March 1895; Melbourne, Victoria
- Died: 5 August 1964 (aged 69); Peppermint Grove
- Original team: University Metropolitan Club

Playing career^{1}
Years	Club	Games (Goals)
1914	University	1 (2)
- ^{1} Playing statistics correct to the end of 1914.

Adrian Ward Farmer (14 March 1895 – 5 August 1964) was an Australian rules footballer who played with University in the Victorian Football League (VFL).

Born in Melbourne to Paul Ward Farmer and Helena Joyce, Farmer was educated at Trinity Grammar School. He later studied medicine at the University of Melbourne. While a first year student, Farmer player a solitary VFL game in the second last round of the 1914 VFL season, scoring two goals as an undermanned University team were defeated by Fitzroy. He also played district cricket for University from 1914 to 1919. After University left the VFL at the end of the 1914 season, he remained with the club when it resumed in the Metropolitan Amateur Football Association (MAFA) in 1915.

Farmer enlisted to serve in World War I in June 1918 but was never called up and was demobilised in December 1918.

After completing his medical studies Farmer moved to Western Australia and commenced practice in Perth, specialising in ear, nose and throat conditions. He married Jean Saltau on 4 April 1922.

Farmer later served in World War II as Commanding Officer of the 2/4th Casualty Clearing Station in Tampoi, Johor, Malaysia and was taken as a prisoner of war by the Japanese, spending over three years in prison before being released at the end of the war.

Farmer died in Perth on 5 August 1964.
