= Nicky Newton-King =

First female CEO of the Johannesburg Stock Exchange, South Africa

Nicola Frances Newton-King
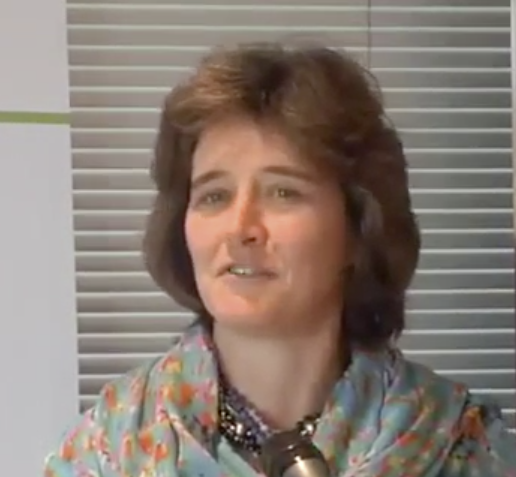
- Nicky Newton-King at press conference in 2014
- Born: 1966 (age 59–60)
- Education: Stellenbosch University
- Occupation: Former CEO of the JSE Ltd

Nicky Newton-King (born 1966) is a corporate finance and securities regulation lawyer and was the first woman Chief Executive Officer in the 125-year history of the Johannesburg Stock exchange (JSE).

== Education and career ==
Newton-King attended Stellenbosch University where she completed her BA and LLB. She attained an LLM (first class honours) specialising in corporate finance, securities regulation and administrative law at the University of Cambridge, England in 1994. While at Cambridge, Queens' College awarded her a Foundation Scholarship for academic achievement.

During her time with Webber Wentzel Bowens Attorneys she advised companies within the securities and financial services industries.

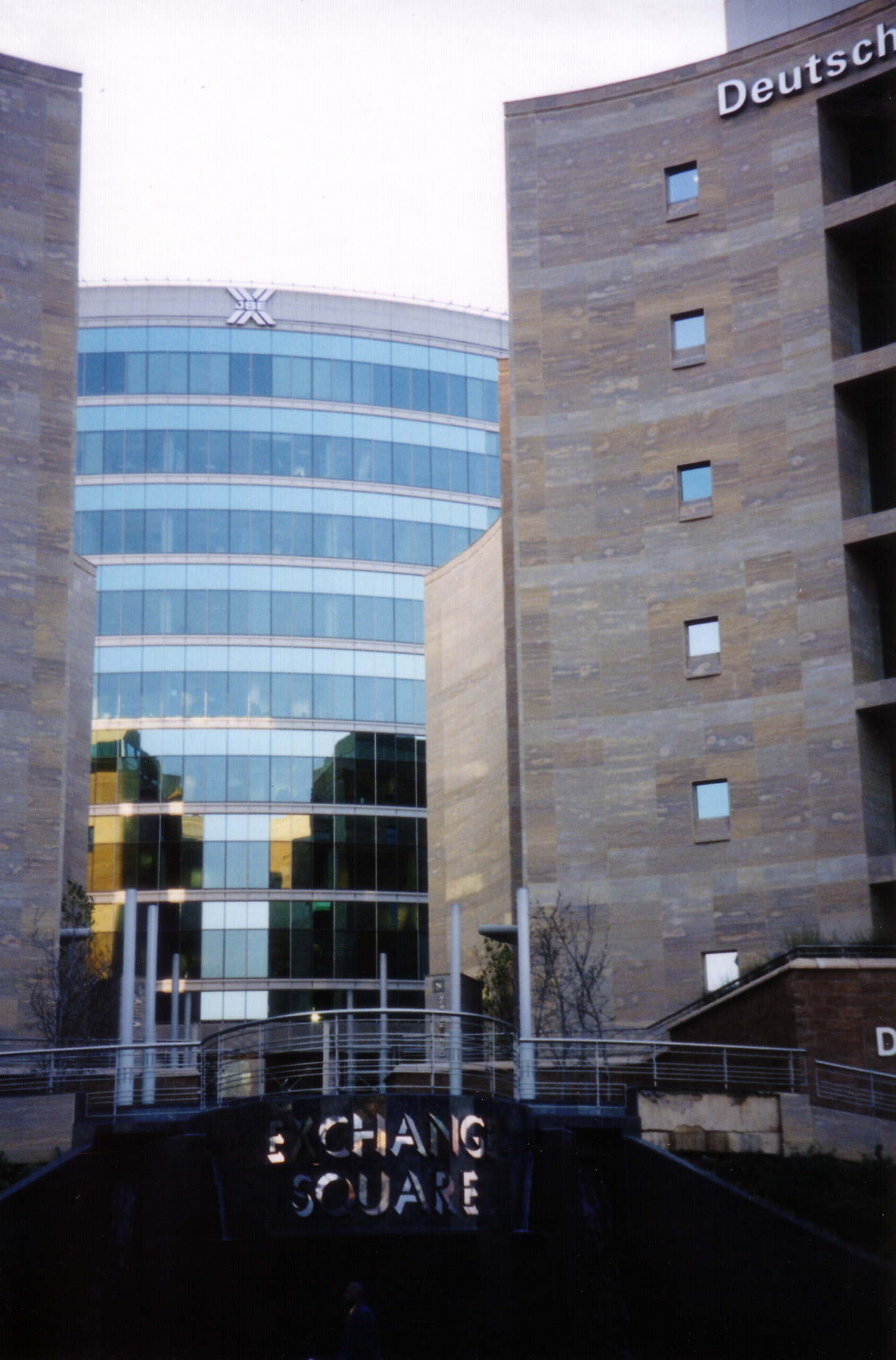
The Johannesburg Stock Exchange building

Newton-King joined the JSE in 1996 and became the executive director of the JSE in 2000. She was appointed to the board of the JSE in 2005 and became CEO of the JSE in January 2012, replacing Russell Loubser. As deputy CEO she was involved in the introduction of affirmative action policies and an employment equity plan at the JSE. She was also responsible for their data vending business and eCommerce initiatives.

On 28 October 2014 she became Director of World Federation of Exchanges. She serves as a Member of the Financial Markets Advisory Board and the Presidential Remuneration Commission. She serves as member of the King Task Group into insider trading and the Financial Markets Advisory Board, and helped draft the Insider Trading Act, 1998. This statute provides for compensation for losses suffered as a result of insider trading. Since 2018 she has been a Non-Executive Director of Strate (Pty) Ltd.

On 30 July 2019, JSE Chairman Nonkululeko Nyembezi-Heita announced that Newton-King would resign on 1 October 2019. She was replaced as JSE CEO by Leila Fourie, a Commonwealth Bank of Australia executive. Newton-King confirmed that she had retired from the JSE at the final day of the Gartner Symposium SA on 2 October 2019.

== Awards and achievements ==
- Business Woman of the Year (2003).
- World Economic Forum 100 Global Leaders for Tomorrow (2003).
- One of eight South Africans at the Young Global Leaders Forum (2005).
- Yale World Fellow (2006).

Business positions
Preceded by Russell Loubser	CEO of the JSE Limited; 2012 – 2019	Succeeded by Leila Fourie
