= Diamond Bessie =

American murder victim

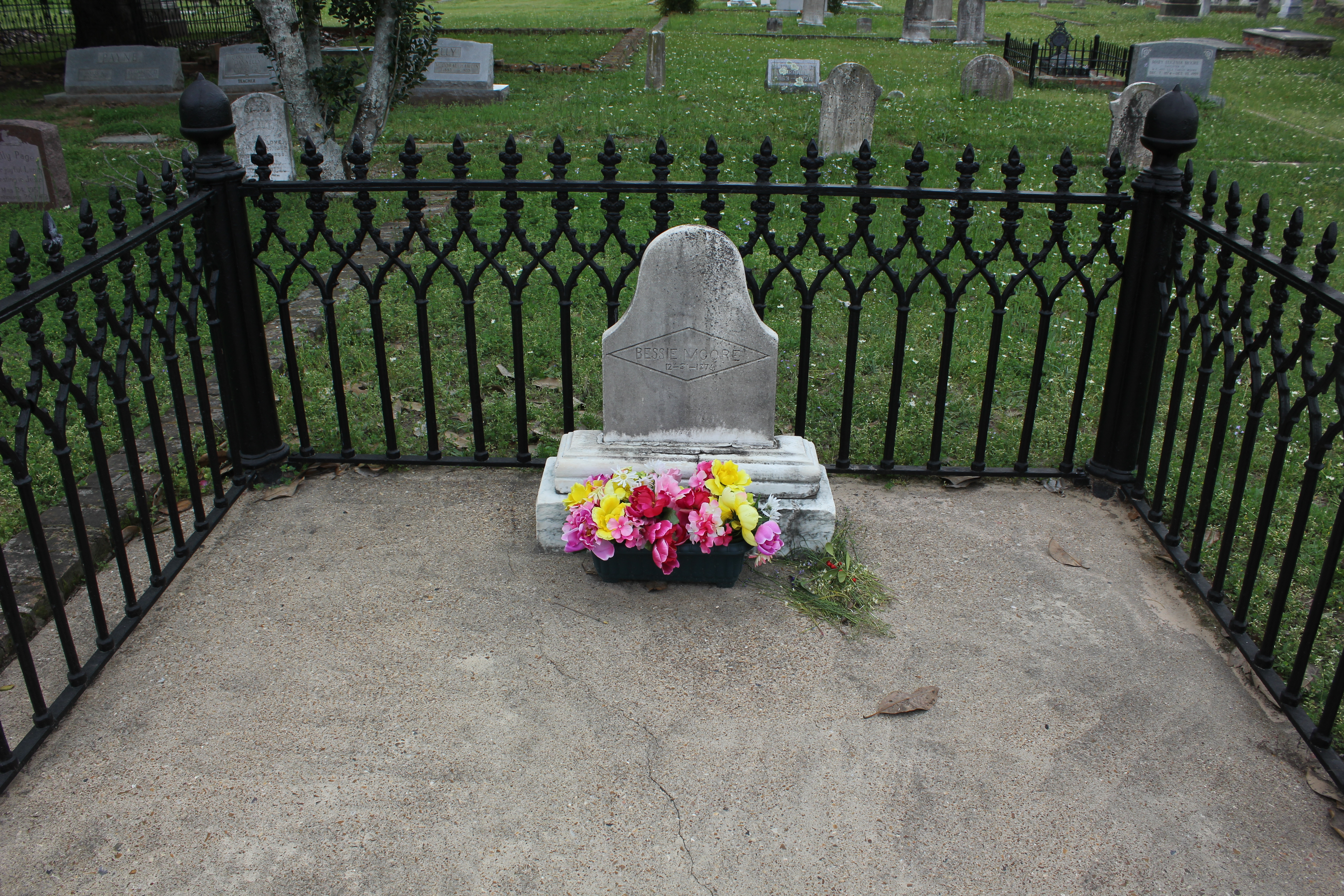
- Grave of Diamond Bessie in Jefferson, Texas
- Born: Annie Stone; 1854; Syracuse, New York,
- Died: 1877 (aged 22–23); Jefferson, Texas
- Occupation: Prostitute
- Partner: Abraham "Abe" Rothschild

Diamond Bessie (1854 - January 21, 1877) was the popular name given to Bessie Moore, née Annie Stone (although other sources give her birth name as Annie Moore), a prostitute whose murder in the woods outside Jefferson, Texas propelled her to the level of local legend. She was killed by a single gunshot wound to the head, allegedly by her husband, Abraham Rothschild.

== Early life ==
Bessie was born in 1854 in Syracuse, New York, to a shoe dealer. At 15, she left home and took up with a man named Moore. She was described as an extraordinary beauty with black hair and brilliant grey eyes.

After this affair ended, she entered into prostitution (though she kept Moore's name). By all accounts, she adapted to the life quickly, and her numerous male admirers showered her with gifts of diamond jewelry. Moore plied her trade in brothels, firstly in the Mansion of Joy brothel in Cincinnati, Ohio. She later worked at brothels in New Orleans, Louisiana and finally Hot Springs, Arkansas.

== Association with Abraham Rothschild ==
Abraham (or Abe) Rothschild (born 1853 in Cincinnati, Ohio) was the son of Meyer Rothschild, a Cincinnati jeweler. He was not a member of the prominent European Rothschild banking family. He was handsome and a capable businessman, and for a time he worked as a traveling salesman for his father's prosperous jewelry business. His future looked bright, but his attraction to fast living and women soon led to alcoholism, and he became an embarrassment to his family, frequenting saloons and brothels. He met Bessie Moore in a Hot Springs brothel in 1876. From this time until her death, they were together.

Moore pressured Rothschild to marry her, and according to various accounts, she may have claimed she was pregnant (an autopsy later showed that she was not) and threatened to reveal this scandalous fact to Rothschild's father. Whatever the motive, Moore and Rothschild's relationship was known to be tumultuous, marred by alcoholism and physical abuse. Rothschild is said to have forced Moore to prostitute herself numerous times during their travels together.

On their way from Chicago to Texas in January 1877, they stopped in Danville, Illinois where they married at the Aetna Hotel. A reporter with the Danville News talked to the couple and published an article about them on January 11, 1877. Later, the Cincinnati Enquirer learned of the nuptials and published the news item from Danville on March 3, 1877: "The following from the Danville News may be accepted as conclusive evidence of the marriage of Abe Rothschild to Bessie Moore. She was as pretty as a picture. Her auburn hair, French twist, contrasted handsomely with her large blue eyes. Her lovely complexion and graceful form would have tired the heart of an Italian sculptor... They arrived as by appointment in the city yesterday afternoon and drove to the Aetna House, where matters were arranged and the date, day, and hour settled... Justice McMahan officiating, the nuptials were tied at the Aetna House. A reporter offered the congratulations of the News to the happy pair last night, and found them in room 52 making preparations for a journey into the Land of Morpheus, but they intended to change cars at 1:10 this morning and go South via E.T.H. & C. Bon voyage Mr. and Mrs. A. Rothschild."

On January 17, 1877, the couple registered as husband and wife at the Capitol Hotel in Marshall, Texas, about 18 miles south of Jefferson. After two days, they traveled to Jefferson by train. Jefferson was, at this time, one of the largest and busiest river ports west of the Mississippi River. The exact nature of Rothschild's business in Jefferson is not known, nor at what point his plan to murder Moore might have been hatched.

The couple registered at the Brooks House in Jefferson as "A. Munroe and wife". Their fine clothes and, of course, Moore's diamonds, made an immediate impression on the townsfolk. Rothschild is said to have first addressed his wife as "Bessie" during this trip, and the locals adapted this into "Diamond Bessie".

== Death ==
On the morning of January 21, Rothschild bought a picnic lunch from Henrique's Restaurant, and the couple crossed the bridge at Cypress Bayou, walking away from town along the Marshall road. The last person to see them together was Frank Malloy, who noticed them in the restaurant before 11:00 am; Malloy took special note of Moore's massive diamond rings. About three hours later, Rothschild was seen crossing the bridge back into Jefferson alone.

When questioned about his wife's whereabouts at the Brooks House, Rothschild claimed she had stayed across the Bayou to visit friends. The following morning, he took breakfast alone at the hotel, where he was seen wearing Moore's rings. On the morning of Tuesday, January 23, he boarded a train to Cincinnati with his and Moore's luggage.

Bessie Moore's body was discovered in the woods along the Marshall road on the afternoon of February 5 by Sarah King, an African American woman out collecting firewood. She had been shot in the head. The remnants of a picnic lunch were still scattered about. Her body was fully clothed, and had no jewelry. The townsfolk held a collection and raised $150 to pay for Moore's burial.

== Arrest and trials ==
In Cincinnati, Rothschild began drinking more heavily and was reportedly becoming quite paranoid, believing himself to be followed everywhere. He tried to shoot himself outside a saloon in late February, but only succeeded in putting out his right eye. After a few days in the hospital, he was arrested and jailed, awaiting extradition to Texas for the murder of "Diamond Bessie Moore".

With Rothschild's real identity known, the case quickly became a cause celebre. The public fascination with the murder of a beautiful young woman at the hands of a wealthy scion of society held a lurid appeal comparable to the contemporary murder trials of O. J. Simpson or the Menéndez brothers. It was Texas' first big murder case, called by Texas governor Richard B. Hubbard, "a crime unparalleled in the record of blood."

Though Rothschild was the black sheep of his family, their fear of devastating scandal evidently prompted them to rally to his side and hire him a formidable defense team. Rothschild had no fewer than 10 high-priced attorneys. They immediately secured a change of venue, as feelings toward Rothschild in Jefferson were so hostile, any possible jury pool was hopelessly tainted. The townspeople were known to have contributed money to reimburse Sheriff John Vines for his trip to Cincinnati to arrest Rothschild.

The case finally went to trial in December 1878 in Marshall. While in jail in Marshall, Rothschild's cellmate was Jim Currie, a railroad employee who had shot two actors, killing one; the survivor was actor Maurice Barrymore.

After a 3 week long trial Rothschild was convicted and sentenced to death by hanging, but the conviction was overturned on appeal. There was widespread opinion that Rothschild's wealth and Moore being a prostitute influenced the appellate court.

After much legal wrangling, Rothschild went to trial again on December 22, 1880, this time in Jefferson. Rothschild did not testify in his own defense, and his lawyers managed to plant doubts in the jury members. Rothschild, to the dismay of many, was acquitted, and rejoined his family in Cincinnati.

After the acquittal, Rothschild returned to Cincinnati and continued a life of crime. Rothschild's later exploits include posing as a wealthy businessman in several southern towns to acquire large quantities of jewelry on credit, and then quickly leaving town before being discovered.

Diamond Bessie Moore became a figure of folklore. Every May since 1955, Jefferson during its annual Pilgrimage Festival, produces a play titled The Diamond Bessie Murder Trial, derived from court transcripts, is performed. Diamond Bessie's grave in Jefferson's Oakwood Cemetery is a popular tourist attraction; unmarked for years, it bears a tombstone, installed one 1930s night by a retired foundry worker, E B McDonald: "I placed it there one night because it did not seem right for Diamond Bessie to sleep in an unmarked grave." Note the date on the tombstone he put is incorrect as she was last seen alive on January 21, 1877, and found dead on February 5, 1877. The Jessie Wise Allen Garden Club later erected an ornate iron fence around the plot.

== Bibliography ==
- Abbott, Olyve (August 24, 2001). Ghosts In The Graveyard: Texas Cemetery Tales. Taylor Trade Publishing. ISBN 978-1-4616-6195-5.
- Biffle, Kent (1993). A month of Sundays. Denton: University of North Texas Press. ISBN 978-0-929398-56-3.
- DeArment, Robert K. (November 27, 2012). Deadly Dozen: Forgotten Gunfighters of the Old West. Norman: University of Oklahoma Press. ISBN 978-0-8061-8265-0.
- Grady, Wayne; Simonds, Merilyn (2011). Breakfast at the Exit Café: Travels Through America. Greystone Books Ltd. ISBN 9781553658269.
- Gruver, Cynthia; Killeen, Roy (1989). Country Inns of Texas. 101 Productions. ISBN 9780897211802.
- Haile, Bartee (2014). Murder Most Texan. Arcadia Publishing. ISBN 9781625852625.
- Harvey, Bill (January 1, 2010). Texas Cemeteries: The Resting Places of Famous, Infamous, and Just Plain Interesting Texans. University of Texas Press. ISBN 978-0-292-77934-1.
- Hubbard, George (2002). Humor & Drama of Early Texas. Taylor Trade Publications. ISBN 9781556228438.
- Massey, Cynthia Leal (August 1, 2021). What Lies Beneath: Texas Pioneer Cemeteries and Graveyards. Guilford, Connecticut: Rowman & Littlefield. ISBN 978-1-4930-4861-8.
- Woolley, Bryan (2000). Final Destinations: A Travel Guide for Remarkable Cemeteries in Texas, New Mexico, Oklahoma, Arkansas, and Louisiana. University of North Texas Press. ISBN 9781574410853.
