= Alfred de Rothschild =

British Banker born in 1842

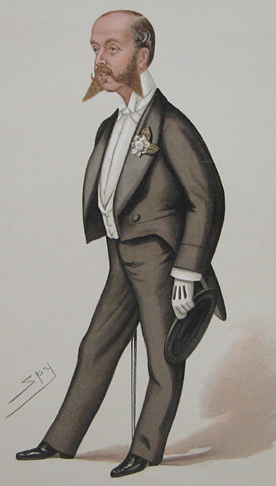
- Alfred de Rothschild, by Leslie Ward, 1884
- Born: Alfred Charles de Rothschild; 20 July 1842; Piccadilly, Westminster, England
- Died: 31 January 1918 (aged 75); Mayfair, London, England
- Resting place: Willesden Jewish Cemetery
- Education: King's College, London, Trinity College, Cambridge
- Occupations: Banker, consul, art collector, philanthropist
- Board member of: N M Rothschild & Sons, Bank of England, National Gallery, Wallace Collection
- Partner: Marie Boyer
- Children: Almina
- Parent(s): Lionel Freiherr de Rothschild; Charlotte von Rothschild
- Awards: Royal Victorian Order (1902); Legion of Honour; Order of the Crown (Prussia); Order of Franz Joseph

Alfred Charles de Rothschild, CVO (20 July 1842 – 31 January 1918), was an English banker and art collector who was director of the Bank of England from 1868–89. A member of the Rothschild family, he was the second son of Lionel Freiherr de Rothschild and Charlotte Freifrau von Rothschild.

== Education ==
As a young man, Alfred attended King's College School, Wimbledon, and subsequently Trinity College, Cambridge, where he would study Mathematics for two terms. It was at Trinity College that Alfred formed a lasting friendship with the Prince of Wales, later King Edward VII. Alfred left Cambridge University without a degree.

He was commissioned as a Lieutenant in the Royal Buckinghamshire Militia (King's Own) on 14 May 1863 and served in the part-time regiment until his resignation in 1871.

== Banking career ==
At the age of 21, Alfred took up employment at the N.M. Rothschild Bank at New Court in London. It was there that he learnt the business of banking from his father and made valuable contacts in European banking circles.

In 1868, at the age of 26, Alfred became a director of the Bank of England, a post he held for 20 years, until 1889. In 1892, he represented the British Government at the International Monetary Conference in Brussels.

His career at the Bank of England was described in The Rothschilds: A Family of Fortune, by Virginia Cowles:

Alfred was not only a partner at New Court but a Director of the Bank of England, an appointment he had been given in 1868 because the Governor felt it would not be a bad thing to keep in close touch with the Rothschilds. The relationship came to an abrupt end of 1889, however, over a slightly unorthodox situation. Alfred had paid a very high price for a French eighteenth-century painting after being assured by the dealer that he, too, had been forced to pay an excessive sum for it and was making only a marginal profit. A day or two later Alfred discovered that the dealer had an account with the Bank of England. He could not resist taking a peep to see what, in fact, the man had given for the painting. He was outraged when he discovered that he had been charged a price 'out of all proportion to decency!' He spread the story about London and, not surprisingly, got the sack from Threadneedle Street.

He was the first Jew to be a Director of the Bank of England, and, after his departure, no other Jew was on the directorate for more than fifty years.

Upon the death of his father in 1879, Alfred inherited a 1,400-acre (570 ha) estate centred on Halton in Buckinghamshire. As Alfred lacked a country retreat and the Halton estate did not provide one, Alfred set about building a house in the style of a French chateau. Work started around 1880 and Halton House was finished in July 1883. Alfred remained in residence at Seamore Place in London and only ever used Halton House for social purposes. In 1889, he was appointed as the inaugural High Sheriff of the County of London.

Alfred played a part in British diplomacy, serving as British delegate at an international conference on bimetallism in 1892, and later facilitating a series of informal meetings between ministers and contacts at the German Embassy with a view to Anglo-German rapprochement. Before the First World War, he was Consul-General for Austria in London.

== Honours ==
Rothschild was invested as a Commander of the Royal Victorian Order (CVO) by King Edward VII at Buckingham Palace in 1902. He was awarded the Legion of Honour by the government of France and the 1st Class Order of the Crown by the Kingdom of Prussia, and made Grand Cross of the Order of Franz Joseph of Austria-Hungary.

== Philanthropy ==
A patron of the arts, he donated money to the National Gallery, London for acquisitions. He was trustee of both that gallery and the Wallace Collection.

== Daughter ==
Alfred de Rothschild probably had an illegitimate child from a long-term relationship with Mrs. Marie ("Mina") Boyer Wombwell. The birth certificate states her father as "Frederick C. Wombwell", but Alfred always acted as her guardian, and the girl's name, Almina, suggests the combination of "Al" and "Mina". However, it has also been assumed that Alfred was primarily homosexual, and it is possible that Alfred encouraged an illusion of paternity as a way of deflecting attention from his sexuality.

In 1895, at age 19, Almina married The 5th Earl of Carnarvon, thus becoming the Countess of Carnarvon. Alfred enabled the union by providing a £500,000 dowry (equivalent to £56.8 million in 2025 pounds) that allowed her financially hard-pressed husband to maintain the family estate, Highclere Castle, and pay off his debts. Further funds followed and, on his death, Alfred left a large part of his estate to her. It was Almina's money that financed her husband's Egyptian excavations that finally led to the discovery of Tutankhamun's tomb in 1922.

In later life, Alfred did not enjoy good health and he died at 1 Seamore Place, Mayfair, after a short illness on 31 January 1918, aged 75. He was interred in the Willesden Jewish Cemetery in the North London suburb of Willesden. In his will, his estate was put at £1,500,000 (equivalent to £73.7 million in 2025 pounds).

== Bibliography ==
- Davis, Richard (1983). The English Rothschilds. Chapel Hill: University of North Carolina Press. ISBN 0807815756.
- Jordaan, Peter (2023). A Secret Between Gentlemen: Suspects, Strays and Guests. Sydney: Alchemie Books. ISBN 9780645852745.

== See also ==
- History of the Jews in England
- Halton House
- Rothschild banking family of England
