= Evelyn de Rothschild (born 1886) =

British banker (1886–1917)

- Born: Evelyn Achille de Rothschild; 6 January 1886; London, England
- Died: 17 November 1917 (aged 31); Palestine
- Cause of death: Killed in action, World War I
- Resting place: Rishon Lezion, Israel
- Education: Trinity College, Cambridge
- Occupation: Financier
- Known for: British Military service
- Parent(s): Leopold de Rothschild; Marie Perugia
- Relatives: Lionel Nathan de Rothschild (brother); Anthony Gustav de Rothschild (brother); See Rothschild family

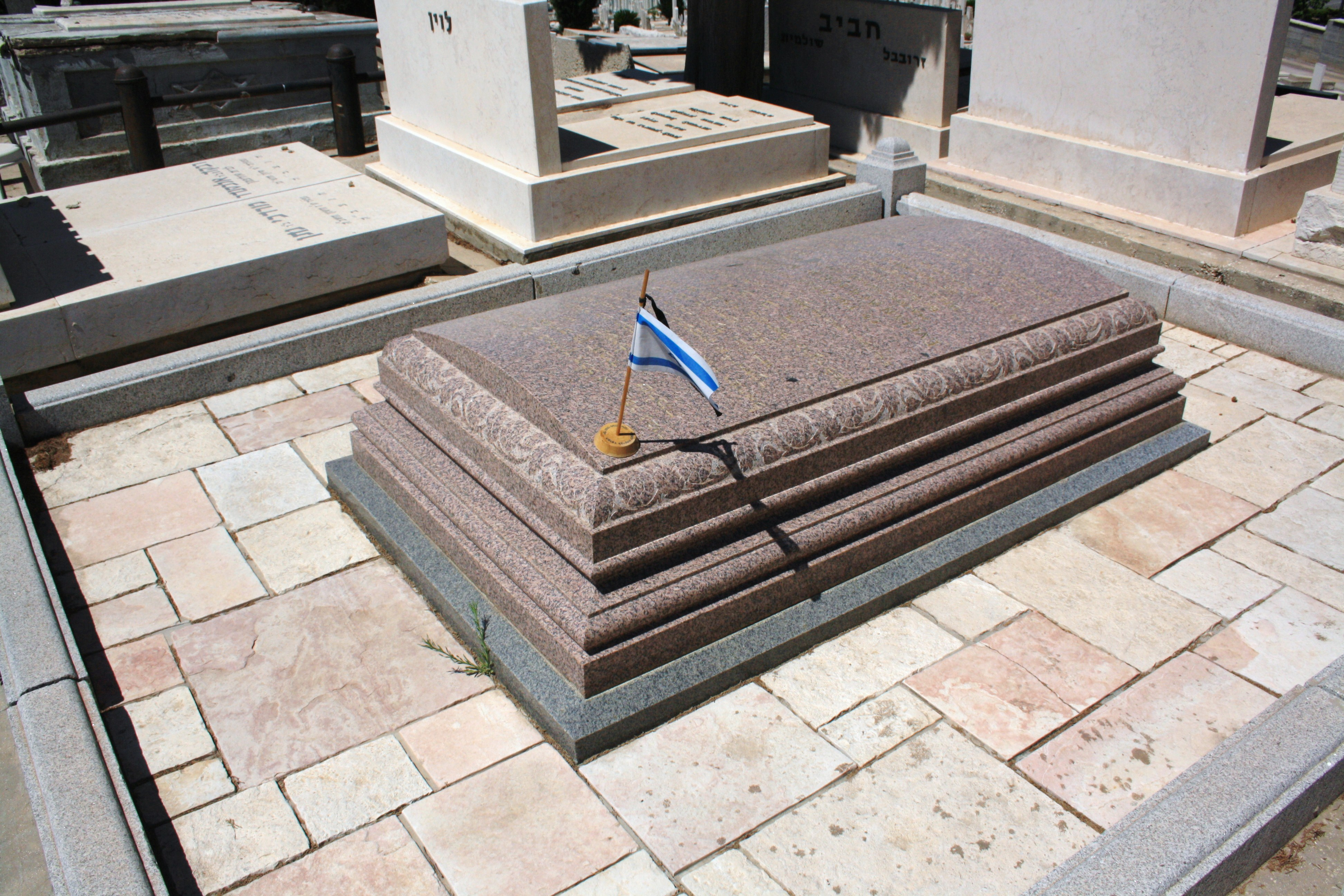
Grave of de Rothschild at Ganei Ester (old) Cemetery in Rishon LeZion.

Evelyn Achille de Rothschild (6 January 1886 – 17 November 1917) was a British banker and soldier. Born in London, England, he was the second of three sons of Leopold de Rothschild (1845–1917) and Marie Perugia (1862–1937) and a part of the prominent Rothschild banking family of England.

== Early life and education ==
De Rothschild was educated at Trinity College, Cambridge, where he was a member of the University Pitt Club and earned a B.A.

== Career ==
=== Military career ===
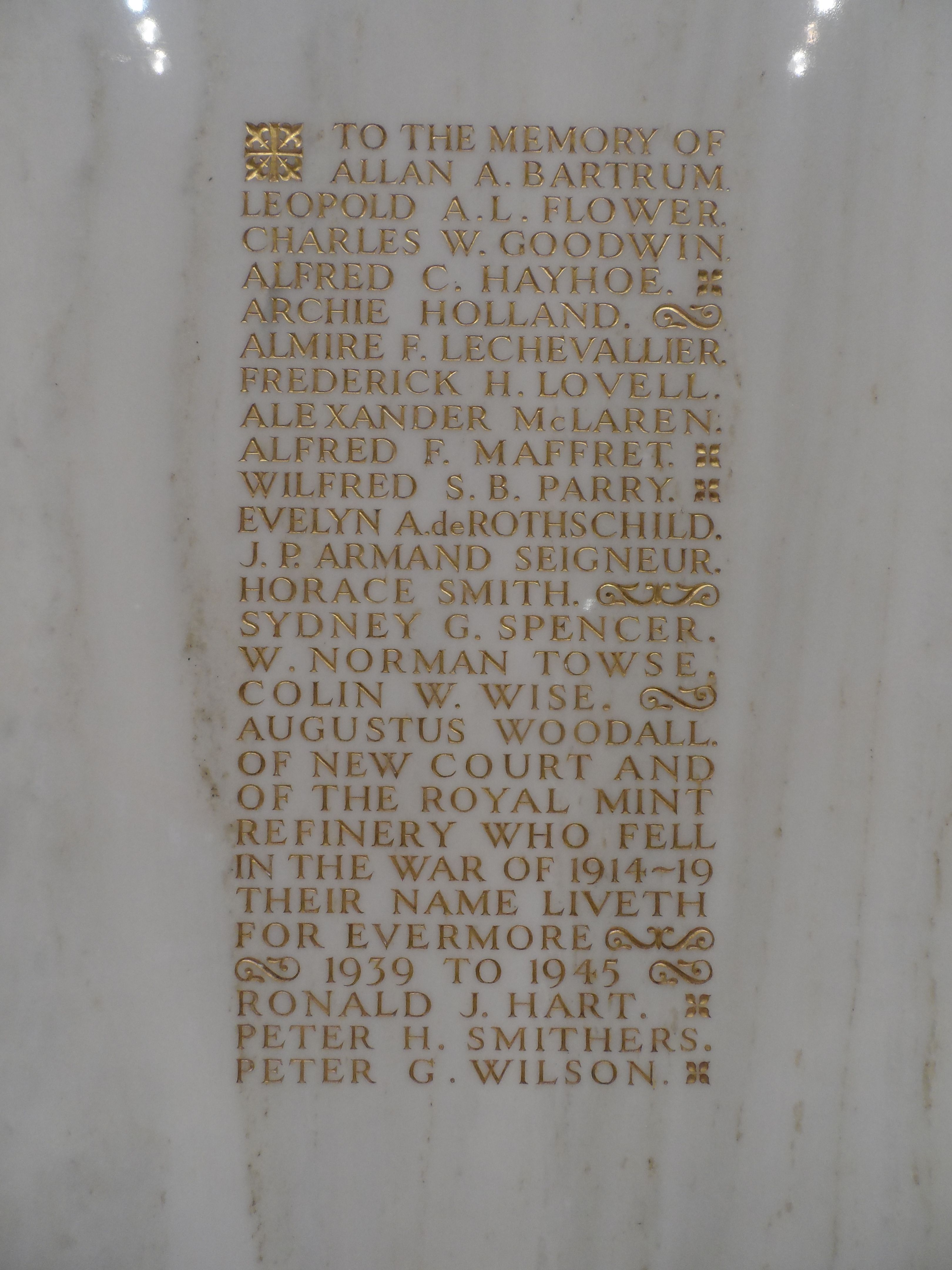
War memorial at Rothschild New Court, naming de Rothschild and those who worked at New Court and the Royal Mint Refinery.

Born into wealth and privilege, Evelyn de Rothschild was expected to play a major role with the N M Rothschild & Sons bank. However, at the outbreak of World War I he and brother Anthony joined the British Army. In November 1915, while serving with the Royal Buckinghamshire Yeomanry on the Gallipoli front, Evelyn de Rothschild was wounded and sent home to recuperate.

Within a few months, de Rothschild was back at the Front where in March 1916 his service resulted in his being mentioned in dispatches. Sent to fight in Palestine, he was critically wounded during the 13 November Battle of Mughar Ridge against the Turkish Seventh Army and died four days later. On 5 December 1920, his brother, Captain Anthony de Rothschild, unveiled the War Memorial in the churchyard of All Saints Church at Wing, Buckinghamshire honoring Evelyn and his other comrades from Wing who were killed in the war.
