= Anthony Gustav de Rothschild =

British banker (1887–1961)

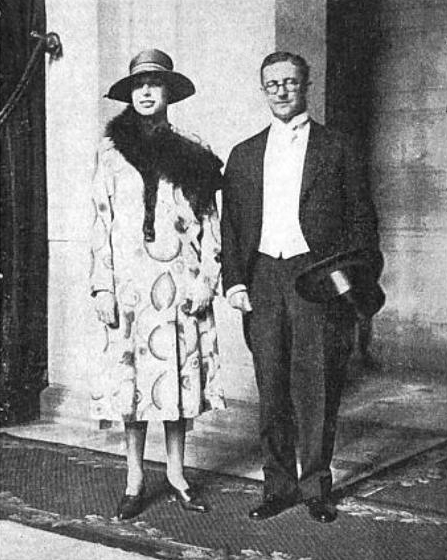
- With his wife Yvonne in 1926
- Born: 26 June 1887; London, England
- Died: 5 February 1961 (aged 73); London, England
- Education: Harrow School, Trinity College, Cambridge
- Occupations: Financier, philanthropist, racehorse owner/breeder
- Board member of: N M Rothschild & Sons
- Spouse: Yvonne Lydia Louise Cahen d'Anvers (m. 1926)
- Children: 3 (including Evelyn de Rothschild)
- Parent(s): Leopold de Rothschild; Marie Perugia
- Relatives: Evelyn Achille de Rothschild (brother); Lionel Nathan de Rothschild (brother)

Anthony Gustav de Rothschild (26 June 1887 – 5 February 1961) was a British banker and member of the Rothschild family.

== Biography ==
Born in London, England, he was the third and youngest of the three sons of Leopold de Rothschild (1845–1917) and Marie Perugia (1862–1937). A part of the prominent Rothschild banking family of England, he was educated at Harrow School and the University of Cambridge where he secured a Double First in history.

At the outbreak of World War I Anthony de Rothschild and his brother Evelyn joined the British Army. While serving with the Buckinghamshire Yeomanry, Anthony was wounded during the Battle of Gallipoli but brother Evelyn died of combat injuries suffered at the 1917 Battle of Mughar Ridge. On 5 December 1920, Captain Anthony de Rothschild unveiled the War Memorial in the churchyard of All Saints Church at Wing, Buckinghamshire honoring his brother and his Wing comrades killed in World War I.

Leopold de Rothschild died in early 1917 and the following year when the War ended, Anthony became one of the managing partners of the family's N M Rothschild & Sons banking house in London. Anthony inherited Ascott House in Ascott, Buckinghamshire.

Anthony de Rothschild was a major force in not only British finance but internationally as well. With brother Lionel having more interest in developing his Exbury Gardens than banking, under Anthony's direction, in 1953 N M Rothschild & Sons led a syndicate that formed the British Newfoundland Development Corporation to undertake mineral exploration in Labrador, Canada and to develop the Churchill Falls hydro-electric station.

Anthony de Rothschild retired as head of the N M Rothschild & Sons banking house in 1961 and was succeeded by his son, Evelyn de Rothschild, who became chairman in 1976. He was active in preserving records of his family until his death. Among his legacies is the Anthony de Rothschild Prize in Surgery and the 1996 gift by his son of the Anthony de Rothschild Building, home of the Buckingham Business School and the Department of Economics and International Studies at the University of Buckingham. The Anthony de Rothschild Lecture Theatre, at St Mary's Campus, Imperial College School of Medicine in London is named in his honour.

== Philanthropy ==
In December 1938 Rothschild was appointed chairman of the Emigration (Planning) Committee, a subcommittee of the Council for German Jewry. The organization had been created in 1936 with the goal of helping German Jews to leave Germany. During World War II he helped organize a safe place for Edvard Beneš to live at The Abbey, Aston Abbotts. In 1941 the German Luftwaffe bombed the Royal Hospital Chelsea in Chelsea, London and Anthony de Rothschild brought a group of elderly pensioners to live at Ascott for the remainder of the War.

In 1949 Anthony de Rothschild donated Ascott House together with its art collections to the National Trust. The donation also included the surrounding 261 acres (1.06 km^{2}) of land plus an endowment for its upkeep.

== Personal life ==
In 1926, he married French countess Yvonne Lydia Louise Cahen d'Anvers (1899–1977) of the Bischoffsheim family. They had the following children:

1. Renée Louise Marie (1927–2015)
2. Anne Sonja (1930–1971)
3. Evelyn Robert Adrian (1931–2022)

Anthony de Rothschild liked exotic luxury automobiles. He purchased a 1934 Hispano-Suiza K6 and a J12 model for himself and his wife. Their vehicles can now be found in the hands of an American collector and were displayed at the 2004 Pebble Beach Concours d'Elegance for the Hispano-Suiza anniversary.

Like his father, Anthony de Rothschild liked Thoroughbred horse racing and inherited the Southcourt Stud breeding farm at Ascott House. He continued to operate the racing stable and breeding operation. Among his racing success, he won the 1919 Grand Prix de Paris with Galloper Light and the 1926 1,000 Guineas Stakes with Pillion. Rothschild also bred Midstream whose wins include the Criterion Stakes, and who was the Leading sire in Australia in 1948, 1951, 1952.

Anthony de Rothschild inherited the works of art at Ascott House from his father and added to the collections with the acquisition of a vast array of books, English furniture, paintings, and more than 400 pieces of Chinese ceramics. In 1937, in memory of his mother, who died that year, he donated the Anthony van Dyck painting, Abbé Scaglia adoring the Virgin and Child to the National Gallery. Also in his large collection was the 1839 J. M. W. Turner painting Cicero at his Villa.
