= Anthony James de Rothschild =

British businessman (born 1977)

- Born: 30 January 1977 (age 49); London, England
- Parent(s): Evelyn Robert de Rothschild; Victoria Lou Schott
- Relatives: David Mayer de Rothschild (brother)

Anthony James de Rothschild (born 30 January 1977) is a British businessman, philanthropist, and a member of the Rothschild banking family of England.

He is the eldest son of Sir Evelyn Robert de Rothschild (1931–2022) by his second wife, American-born Victoria Lou Schott (1949–2021), daughter of Marcia Lou Whitney and Lewis M. Schott. He married Tania Strecker in 2005.
