= Leopold de Rothschild =

British banker (1845–1917)

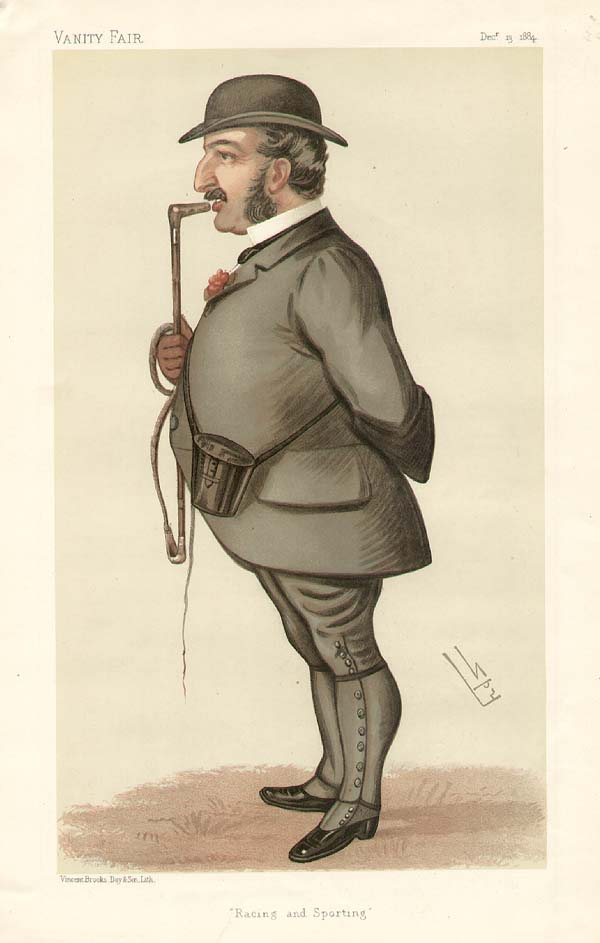
- Caricature of Leopold de Rothschild by Vanity Fair, 1884
- Born: 22 November 1845
- Died: 29 May 1917 (aged 71)
- Education: King's College School; Trinity College, Cambridge
- Occupations: Banker; Thoroughbred breeder
- Spouse: Marie Perugia (m. 1881)
- Children: Lionel Nathan de Rothschild; Evelyn Achille de Rothschild; Anthony Gustav de Rothschild
- Parent(s): Lionel de Rothschild; Charlotte von Rothschild
- Relatives: Mayer Amschel de Rothschild (uncle)

Leopold de Rothschild CVO (22 November 1845 – 29 May 1917) was a British banker, thoroughbred race horse breeder, and a member of the prominent Rothschild family.

== Biography ==
=== Early life ===
Leopold de Rothschild was the third son and youngest of the five children of Lionel de Rothschild (1808–1879) and Charlotte von Rothschild (1819–1884). He was educated at King's College School then went on to Trinity College, Cambridge.

=== Banking career ===
He entered N M Rothschild & Sons in London, the family's banking business. On the death of his uncle Baron Mayer de Rothschild in 1874, he became head of the family's banking business in London and took over most of his uncle's public offices. He also inherited Ascott House in Ascott, Buckinghamshire.

=== Public service ===
Rothschild was a DL and JP for the county of Buckinghamshire. He was invested as a Commander of the Royal Victorian Order (CVO) by King Edward VII at Buckingham Palace on 11 August 1902. He was President of the British Order of Mercy, which was awarded his wife in 1911. He was also active in the Anglo-Jewish community, serving as vice-president of the Anglo-Jewish Association, chairman of the Jewish Emigration Society, and a treasurer of the London Jewish Board of Deputies.

=== Thoroughbred breeding ===
An avid sportsman, he established Southcourt Stud in Southcote, Bedfordshire. He assembled a stable of some of the best thoroughbreds in Europe, his horses winning a number of prestigious races including The Derby, St. Leger Stakes and the 2,000 Guineas. In the Derby of 1879 and 1904, his own horses got the cup.

=== Ealing Football Club (RU) ===
Rothschild was the first president of Ealing Football Club (RU) and held this office from 1896 to 1914.

=== Personal life ===
In 1881, he married Marie Perugia (1862–1937). She was the daughter of the Trieste merchant Achille Perugia. Her sister Louise married Arthur Sassoon. A close friend, Edward, Prince of Wales attended the wedding at London's Central Synagogue. The marriage produced three sons:

- Lionel Nathan (1882–1942)
- Evelyn Achille (1886–1917)
- Anthony Gustav (1887–1961)

They resided at Gunnersbury Park, an estate that at one time had been the residence of Princess Amelia, daughter of George II. The mansion today houses the Gunnersbury Park Museum. An art collector, he owned a number of important paintings by artists such as Jan Davidszoon de Heem.

In 1912, William Tebbit attempted to assassinate him, firing five shots from a revolver at his vehicle and riddling it with bullets.

Following his death on 29 May 1917, he was interred in the family plot in the Willesden Jewish Cemetery in the North London suburb of Willesden.
