= Lionel de Rothschild (born 1882) =

British politician

Lionel de Rothschild OBE
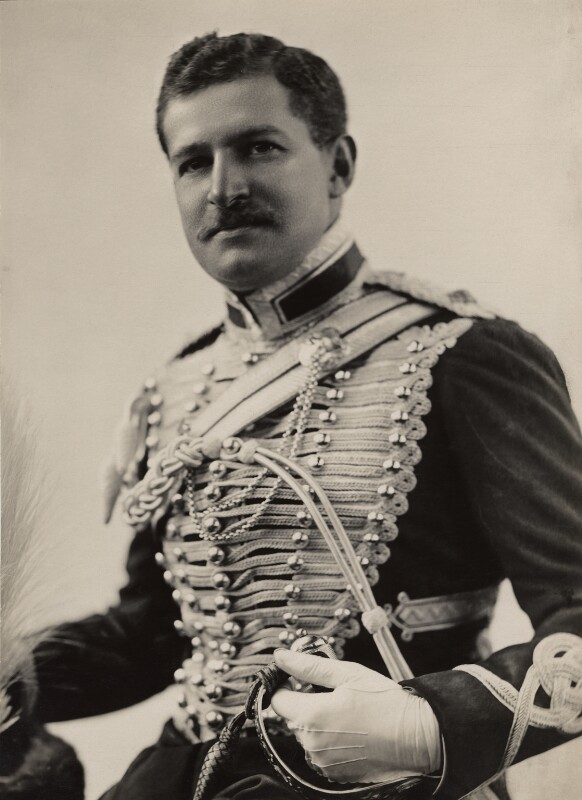

Member of Parliament for Aylesbury
- In office 1910–1922
- Preceded by: Walter Rothschild
- Succeeded by: Thomas Keens

Personal details
- Born: 25 January 1882 London
- Died: 28 January 1942 (aged 60)
- Resting place: Willesden Jewish Cemetery
- Spouse: Marie Louise Eugénie Beer (m. 1912)
- Occupation: Banker, politician, gardener

Major Lionel Nathan de Rothschild, OBE (25 January 1882 – 28 January 1942) was a British banker and Conservative politician best remembered as the creator of Exbury Gardens by the New Forest in Hampshire. He was part of the prominent Rothschild banking family of England. In 1910, he was elected to the House of Commons. In 1917, he co-founded the anti-Zionist League of British Jews.

== Early life and family ==
Lionel Nathan de Rothschild was the eldest of the three sons of Leopold de Rothschild and Marie Perugia. He was born in London and educated at Harrow School and Trinity College, Cambridge, where he graduated BA in 1903 and MA in 1908. On 25 January 1910 he was elected to the House of Commons for the constituency of Aylesbury in Buckinghamshire and was a Member of Parliament until 1923.

In 1912 he married Marie Louise Eugénie Beer. They had the following children:

- Rosemary Leonora Ruth (1913–2013), the first wife of Major Hon Denis Gomer Berry
- Edmund Leopold (1916–2009)
- Naomi Luisa Nina (1920-2007)
- Leopold David (1927–2012)

== World War I ==
At the outbreak of World War I, Lionel's younger brothers Evelyn and Anthony both joined the British Army. However, as the eldest son he was needed as the heir to take over the family's N M Rothschild & Sons banking house. Much to his frustration, Lionel had no choice but to remain at home.

When Britain entered the War in August 1914, Lionel had already been promoted from captain to major in the Royal Buckinghamshire Yeomanry. As the Government recognized that many Jews yet had not been enlisted in military service, a Central Jewish Recruiting Committee was established in December 1915. Its office was located at the Rothschild's New Court, which was colloquially known as "Rothschild’s Recruiting Office", while Lionel was appointed vice-chairman. Chairman was Edmund Sebag-Montefiore.

In 1917 he co-founded and headed the anti-Zionist League of British Jews.

Lionel was made OBE in the Military Division in 1917. He was retired from the regiment in 1921. Both of his brothers were wounded in battle, and brother Evelyn died of combat injuries suffered at the 1917 Battle of Mughar Ridge.

== Engagement in plants ==
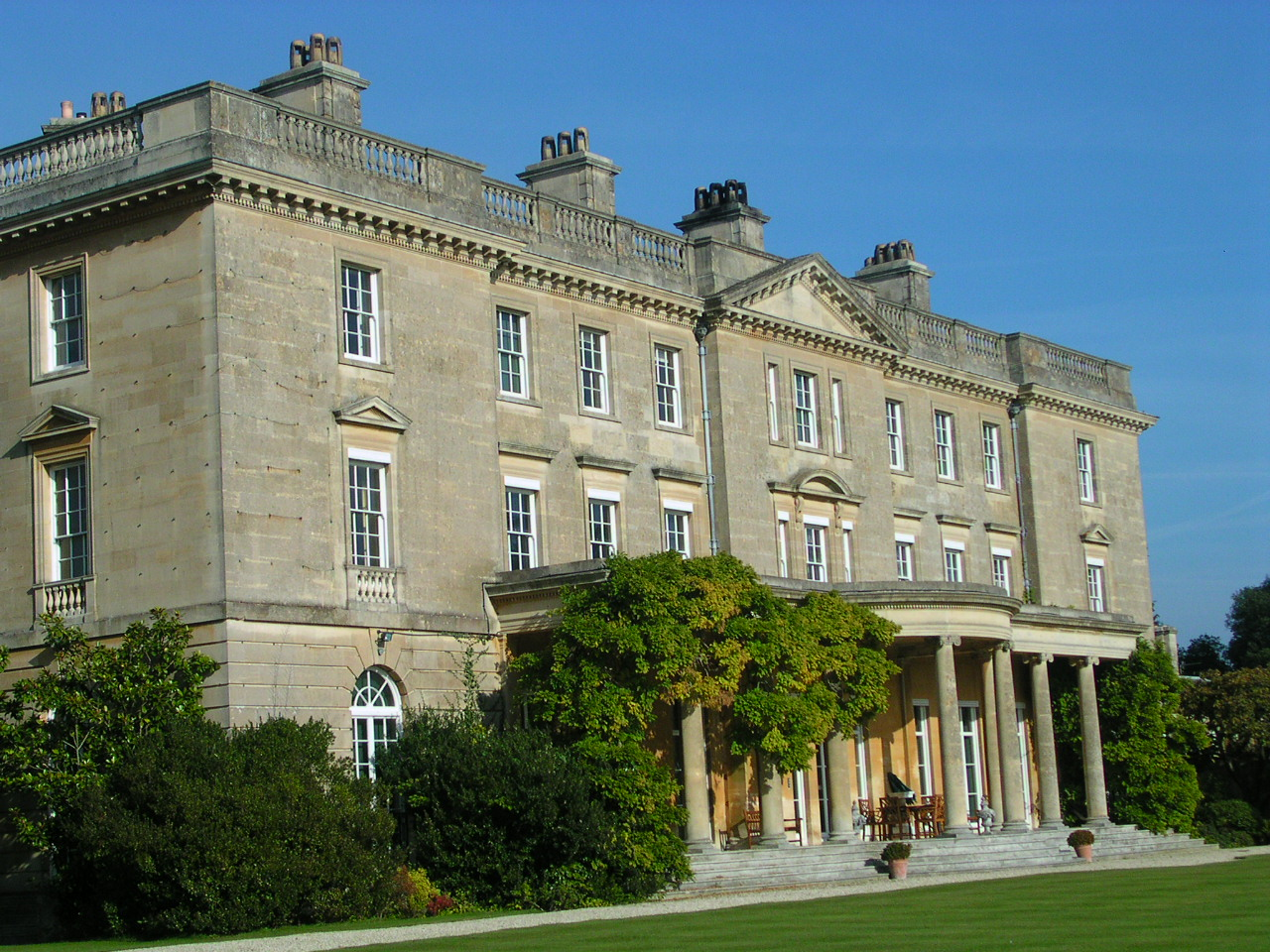
Exbury House

His father, Leopold, died in early 1917 and Lionel and brother Anthony became the managing partners of N M Rothschild & Sons bank. However, Lionel de Rothschild had developed an interest in horticulture at a very young age and is said to have planted his first garden at the age of five. In 1919, he purchased the Mitford estate at Exbury in Hampshire, where he devoted a great deal of time and money to transform it into one of the finest gardens in all of England, with more than one million plants. In the 1920s, he built Exbury House around an existing structure in a neo-Georgian style. He constructed a private railway to transport rocks to build the largest rock garden in the country.

Lionel de Rothschild also co-sponsored plant-hunting expeditions to places as isolated as the Himalayas to collect seed for plant growth and experimentation. In all, he developed 1,204 new hybrids of rhododendron and azalea that were recognized and sold around the world.

Although he continued to work at the family bank, he is quoted as describing himself as "a banker by hobby — a gardener by profession".

== Death ==
Lionel Nathan de Rothschild died in London, aged sixty, in 1942 and was buried in the Willesden Jewish Cemetery. His son Edmund took over management of the Exbury Gardens and would eventually create a charitable trust to manage the property. In 2001, the American Rhododendron Society recognised Lionel Nathan de Rothschild's significant contribution, posthumously bestowing on him a Pioneer Achievement Award.

Parliament of the United Kingdom
Preceded by Walter Rothschild	Member of Parliament for Aylesbury; January 1910–1923	Succeeded by Thomas Keens
