= Exbury Gardens =

Botanical garden in Hampshire, England

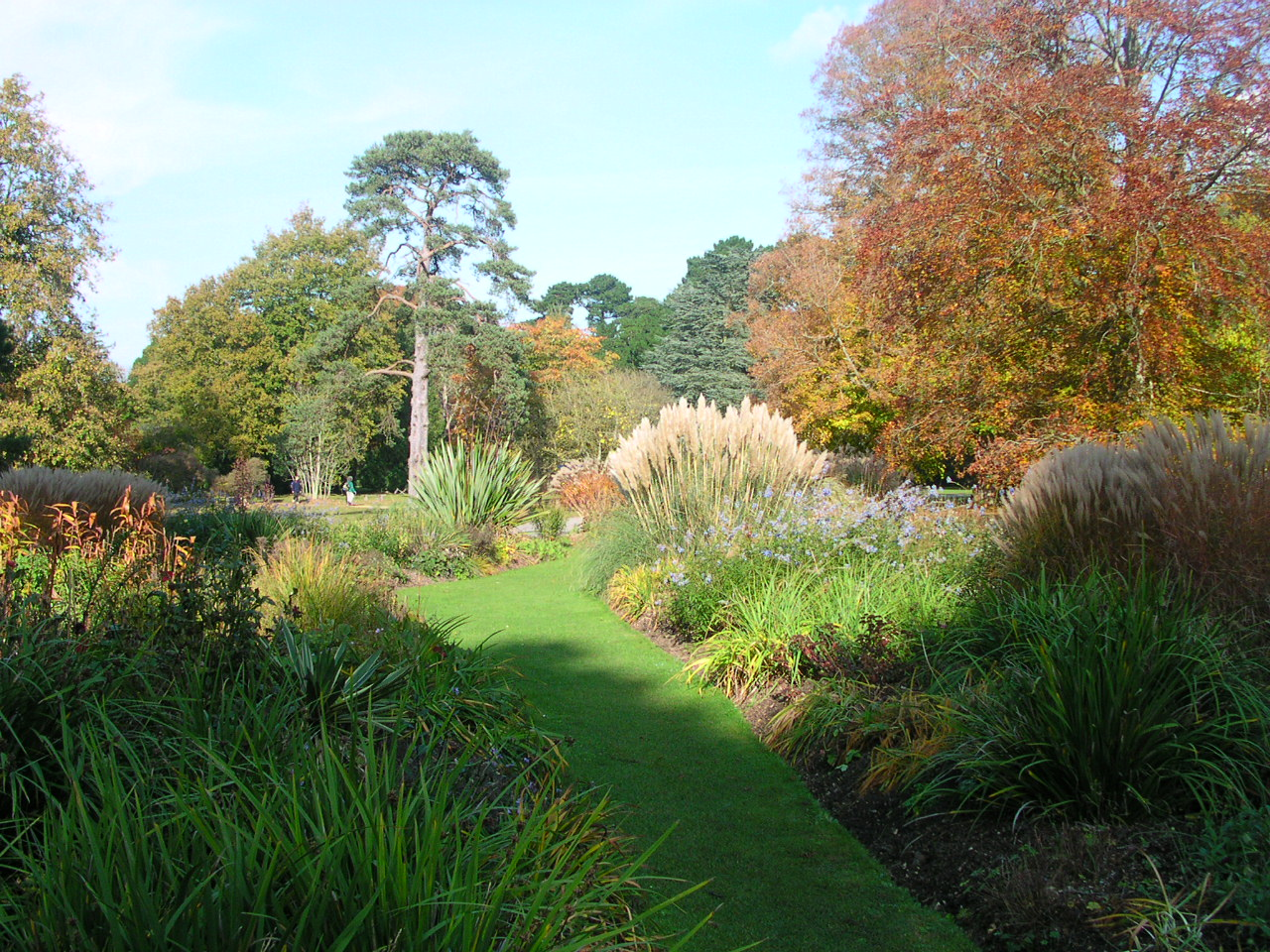
- Herbaceous borders near the house

- Location within Hampshire
- Location: New Forest
- Coordinates: 50°47′55″N 1°24′02″W
- Created: 1919
- Operator: Exbury Gardens Limited
- Designation: Grade II*

Exbury Gardens is a 200-acre (81 ha) informal woodland garden in Hampshire, England, with large collections of rhododendrons, azaleas and camellias, and is often considered the finest garden of its type in the United Kingdom. Exbury holds the national collection of Nyssa (Tupelo) and Oxydendrum under the National Plant Collection scheme run by the Plant Heritage charity. The gardens are rated Grade II* on the National Register of Historic Parks and Gardens.

Lionel Nathan de Rothschild purchased the Exbury estate in 1919 and soon began creating a garden on an ambitious scale, emulating his father's at Gunnersbury Park in London. Exbury House is a neoclassical mansion which was built around an earlier structure in the 1920s; whilst the gardens are open to the public, the house is not.

== Location ==
Exbury Gardens is situated in the village of Exbury, just to the east of Beaulieu, across the river from Buckler's Hard. It is signposted from Beaulieu and from the A326 Southampton to Fawley road in the New Forest. In the summer, the gardens are served by the New Forest Tour open-top bus service.

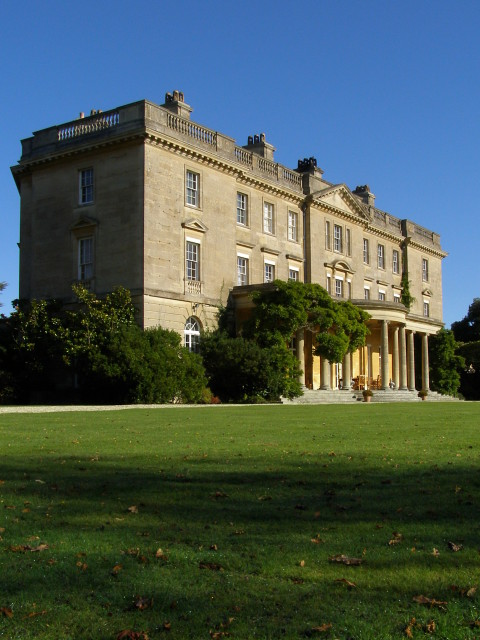
Exbury House

== The gardens ==
Features include the Hydrangea Walk, the Rock Garden, Iris Garden, the Sundial Garden, Centenary Garden and Camellia Walk (which takes visitors to a path alongside Beaulieu river and back via the pond). The indoor Five Arrows Gallery has a collection of lachenalias or leopard lilies and orchids.

The infrastructure included a water tower, three large concrete lined ponds, and 22 miles (35 km) of underground piping. Exbury Gardens is now open to the public for most of the year, with high seasons in the spring for the flowering shrubs and the autumn for the autumn colour.

The Cinema Museum holds film of the gardens in 1967. HMO363

== Administration ==
The gardens are run by a registered charity, Exbury Gardens Limited, whose objects are "to maintain, improve, develop and preserve Exbury Gardens in Hampshire, including opening them to the public, and to advance horticultural science, knowledge and learning for the public's benefit".

== Steam railway ==
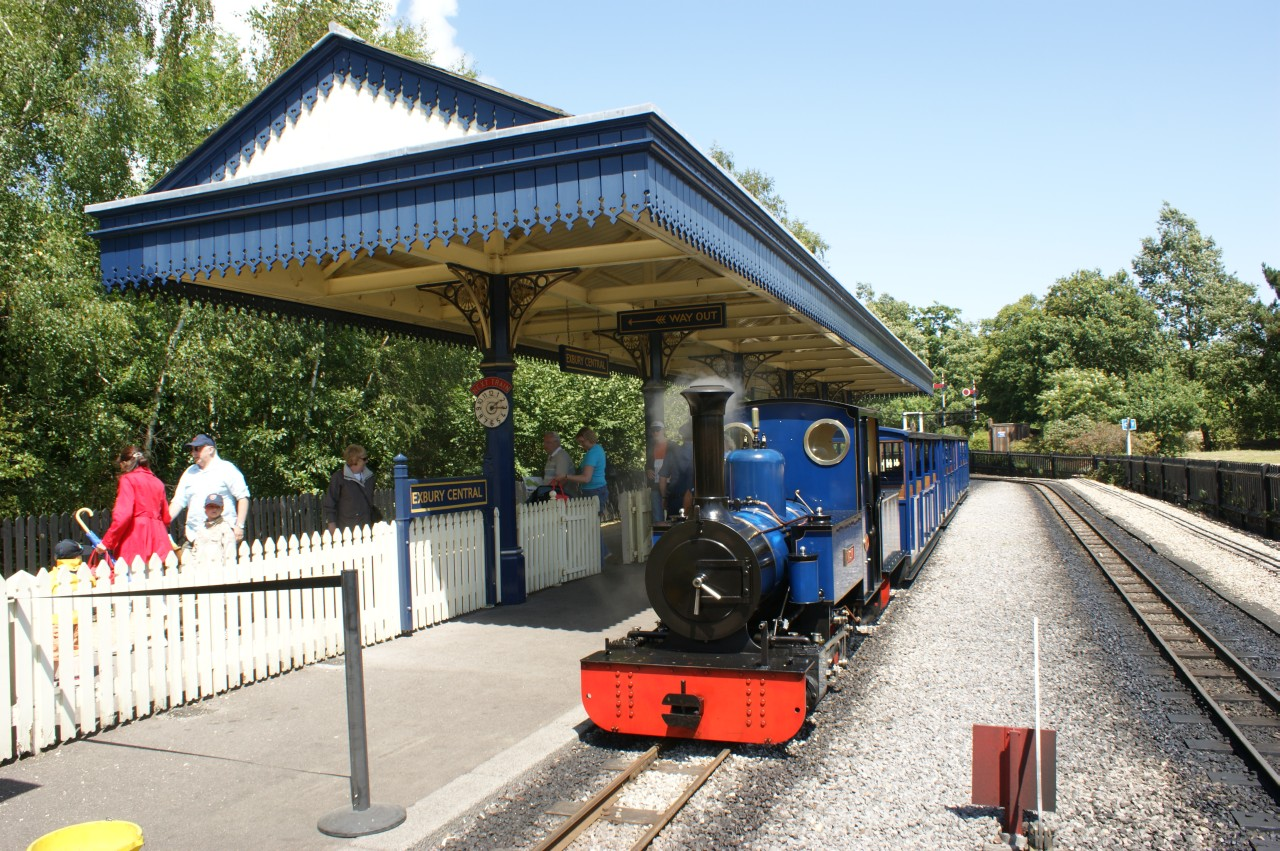
"Naomi" with three coaches at Exbury Central

In the north east corner of the gardens is the 12 1/4 in (311 mm) gauge Exbury Steam Railway that goes on a journey through a tunnel, around Dragonfly Pond, through the Summer Lane Garden, along the top of the rock gardens and into the American Garden. The railway was built in 2000–2001 as an additional attraction in the gardens. Two narrow-gauge-style 0-6-2 tender tank locos were built specially for the line by the Exmoor Steam Railway. The railway is a member of Britain's Great Little Railways.

The railway proved to be more popular than anyone had anticipated, with trains often needing to be double-headed. To solve this problem, a much larger 2-6-2 tender loco, called Marriloo, was built at Exmoor, and entered service in 2008. It is notable for having carried Elizabeth II on a footplate trip round the railway. The railway stages popular Ghost Trains during the October half-term and Santa Steam Specials in the run-up to Christmas.

A diesel locomotive called Eddy is used for shunting operations.
