= Lepe Inshore Rescue =

Coordinates: 50.785095°N 1.36150°W

Lepe Inshore Rescue was established in England in August 1961 as Venturers Search and Rescue. As part of the charity UK Youth Marine Training Academy (YMTA), they provided an inshore rescue service and a land rescue service.

It was staffed by volunteers aged 12–21, and was established to show that teenagers, if given the training, equipment, opportunity and trust could provide a valuable service to the adult community.

== History ==
The service was started by Mr Philip Gordon Pierce-Smith who no longer runs the service he started over 60 years ago, and was started on limited funds and equipment, patrolling Poole Harbour with a small prototype Deep V soft bottom hulled inflatable developed by David Doderell of SWMF in Poole. It proved to be a fantastic hull until the bottom stretched or the wooden keel snapped. The crews had RAF lifejackets and anoraks, navigation was done with a AA road map and handheld compass, a far cry from the current standards. Since then the service has developed, seeing many different rescue boats and hundreds of crew.

The League of Venturers evolved over years thanks largely to a substantial legacy and ongoing support from the public and private persons and the purchase of two Ocean Dynamics waterjet RIBs played a big part in this, however the larger 40 foot cabin RIB had to be sold in late 2005. It was replaced with a Humber Ocean Pro 6.3 that provided a training platform for the Venturers in the waters of the Solent.

Lepe Inshore Rescue, under YMTA, was part of an educational facility that teaches teenagers in all aspects of the marine-based environment, with a view to not just serving the community but improving employment prospects. They could be called upon by the coastguard to attend incidents, and in 2009 the organization attended 90 incidents at sea – double the amount from previous years.

The mostly sea-based training and operations were undertaken from a purpose-built control room next to the old coastguard cottages at Lepe Beach, overlooking the Western Solent and the Beaulieu River. The control room was fully equipped with charts, radio, direction finding equipment and radar.

The land based events and training were run out of the Gangwarily HQ a few miles in land. The premises were also where vehicles were stored and work was undertaken in the workshop at Gangwarily, complete with pit and full set of tools / parts.

The UK YMTA also helped the OGA celebrate their 50th anniversary in 2013 in Cowes and have had many ex members visiting and to exchange memories.

== See also ==
- Solent Rescue – a nearby lifeboat station
