= Solent Rescue =

Search and rescue service in Hampshire, England

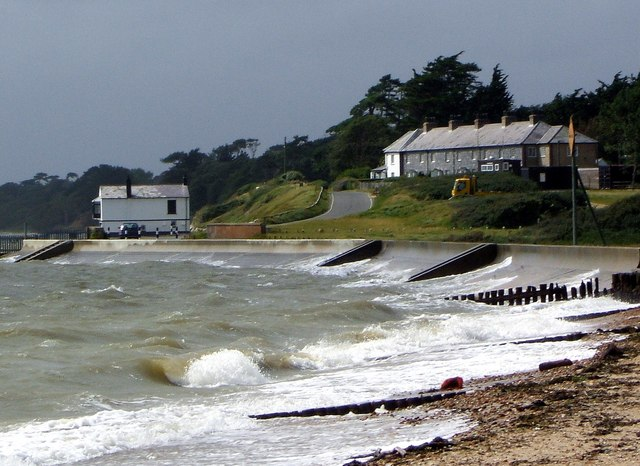
- View to the west from the Solent Rescue Lifeboat Station lookout towards the old coastguard cottages and Beaulieu river entrance.

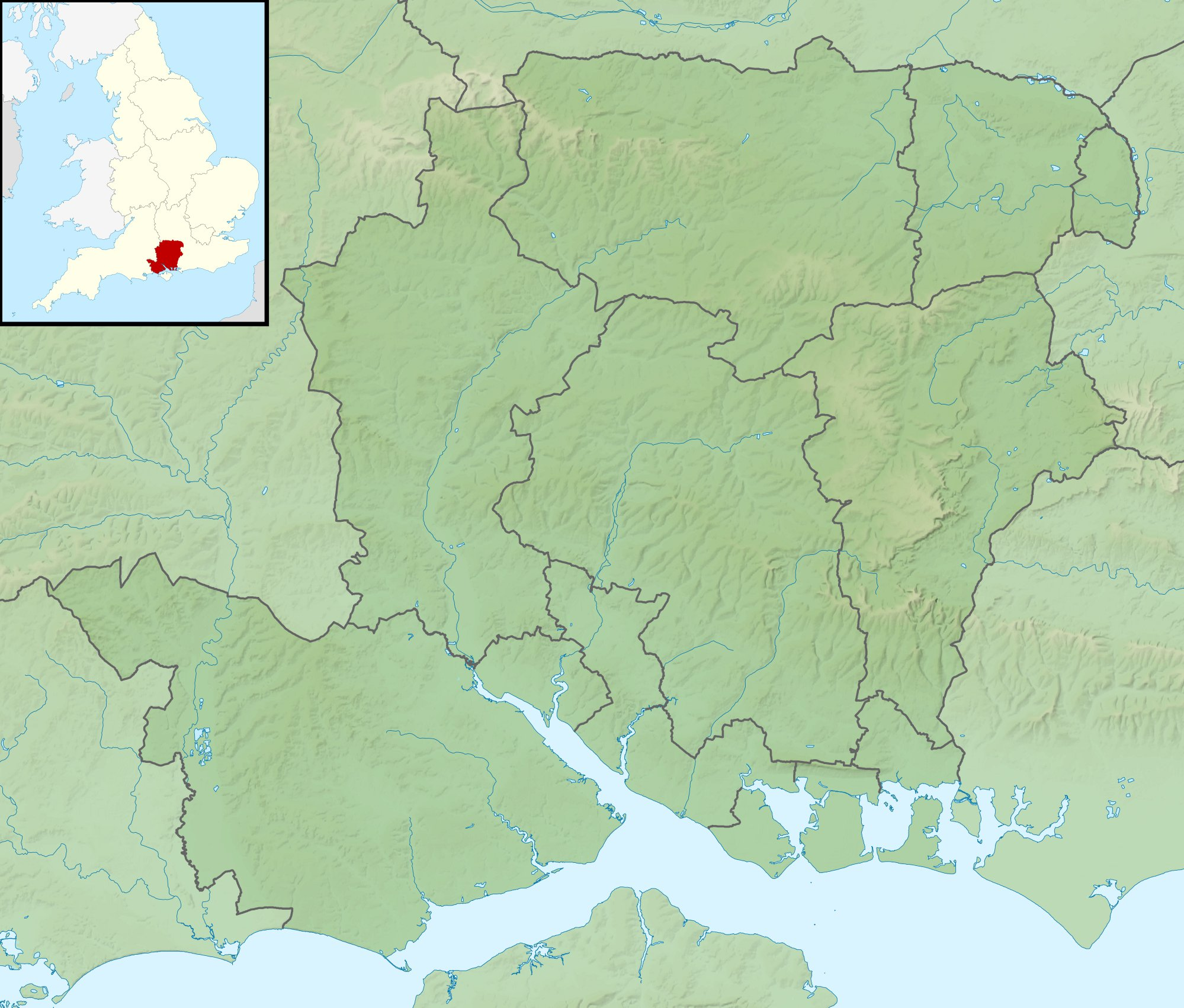
- Location of Solent Rescue Lifeboat station within Hampshire

General information
- Type: Lifeboat Station
- Location: New Forest, Lepe Country Park, Exbury, Hampshire, SO45 1AD, England
- Coordinates: 50°47′03.4″N 1°21′13.4″W
- Opened: 1971
- Owner: Solent Rescue

Website
- Solent Rescue

Solent Rescue is located at Lepe Country Park near Exbury, south of the New Forest, on the north shore of the Solent, in the county of Hampshire, England.

This independent inshore rescue lifeboat service, was originally established as a beach rescue service in 1971.

The service currently operates a VT Halmatic Arctic 24 RIB, Solent Rescue One (SR01), on station since 2019, and a smaller D-class (IB1) Inshore lifeboat, Quantum Lepe (SR02), on station since 2023.

Solent Rescue is a registered charity (No. 267039), supported entirely by public donation, and has 'Declared Facility' status with H.M. Coastguard.

== Description ==
This small independent rescue organisation was set up in 1971 as a beach rescue unit, and has now developed into a full lifeboat station. The organisation operates within a specified area as agreed with HM Coastguard. This covers 33 square miles (85 km^{2}) of water and spans from Cowes in the Central Solent to Hurst Castle in the western fringes of this inshore waterway. Solent Rescue is one of eight independent lifeboats who make up the Solent Sea Rescue Organisation; each of these units have equipment that is tailor-made or selected for their unique areas of operation.

== History ==
From 2011 until 2016, alterations were undertaken at Solent Rescue during this time including improvements to the clifftop weatherproof observation lookout. The main lifeboat was replaced with a 7.9-metre Delta rigid-hulled inflatable boat, powered by twin Suzuki DF90 lean burn engines which reduced response times.

On Season 1 Episode 5 of the Channel 5 programme Construction Squad: Operation Homefront which aired on 4 November 2013, the team behind the show helped Solent Rescue build a new boathouse.

Solent Rescue received a £22,600 grant in 2017 from the Minister of State for Transport, as part of a five-year £5 million scheme for rescue boat teams. That same year, they raised over £100,000 to purchase a high speed rescue lifeboat which they received in Spring 2018. The lifeboat includes a cabin which allows crew to patrol for longer and in broader waters.

Furthermore, additional support assets were purchased with the aim to be able to utilize these to assist in times of inland adverse weather conditions within Hampshire along with close SAR support to Lepe and Stanswood beach fronts.

In 2019 the neighbouring independent Sidmouth Lifeboat Station donated an Arctic 24 lifeboat, Pride of Sidmouth, to Solent Rescue. With this donation, Solent Rescue returned to operating an open RIB, with a vessel far superior to any that they had operated previously.

The unit replaced its lookout post in 2020 with a larger container, to provide better quality crew area and improved views with wrap around windows at the front with permission from the New Forest National Park Authority. The larger space also provides more room for a first aid treatment area.

Most of the 2020 season had to be suspended due to the global COVID-19 pandemic.

The Queen's Award for Voluntary Service was awarded in 2021, the year of Solent Rescue's 50th anniversary, received from Nigel Atkinson, the Lord Lieutenant of Hampshire. That same year, Solent Rescue was the beneficiary of a £17,000 grant on behalf of a fund set up in memory of Charles Burnett III, with the funds being used to improve their Arctic 24 boat and to obtain a new launch trailer.

In 2022 the unit received a £10,000 grant from the National Lottery Community Fund. The Community Fund described the Solent Rescue's work in the Western and Central Solent area as "a vital service in one of the busiest waterways in Europe."

On 28 September 2023, Solent Rescue was featured in Season 8 of the popular television series Saving Lives at Sea. In Episode 1, Solent Rescue played an important role in the dramatic rescue of a young jetskier in distress at Calshot, alongside the Calshot RNLI Lifeboat. Notably, this marked the first appearance of an independent lifeboat organization in the history of the series.

== Station honours ==
The following are awards made at Solent Rescue.

- The Queen's Award for Voluntary Service

Solent Rescue – 2021

== Lifeboats ==
Number	Name	Built	On Station	Class	Power	Comments
SR01	Solent Rescue One	2004	2019–	VT Halmatic Arctic 24	Twin 140-hp Tohatsu	Previously Pride of Sidmouth at Sidmouth (Ind.)
SR02	Quantum Lepe	2010	2023–	D-class (IB1)	Single 50-hp Mariner	Previously RNLB Braund (D-728) at Filey

== See also ==
- Lepe Inshore Rescue – a nearby disbanded station that offered rescue services in the area
- Independent lifeboats in Britain and Ireland
