= Exbury =

Village and parish in Hampshire, England

Coordinates: 50.8008°N 1.3965°W

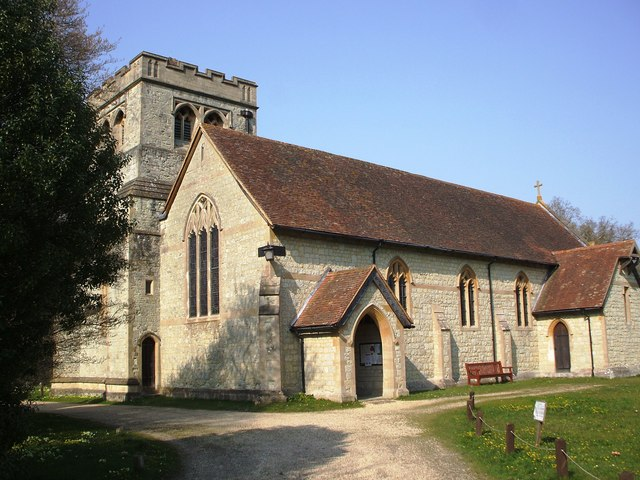
- Exbury Church

- Location within Hampshire
- OS grid reference: SU425003
- Civil parish: Exbury and Lepe
- District: New Forest
- Shire county: Hampshire
- Region: South East
- Country: England
- Sovereign state: United Kingdom
- Post town: SOUTHAMPTON
- Postcode district: SO45
- Dialling code: 023
- Police: Hampshire and Isle of Wight
- Fire: Hampshire and Isle of Wight
- Ambulance: South Central
- UK Parliament: New Forest East

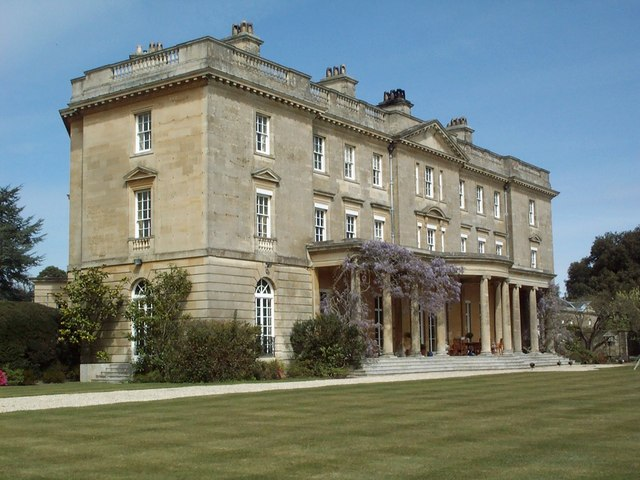
Exbury House

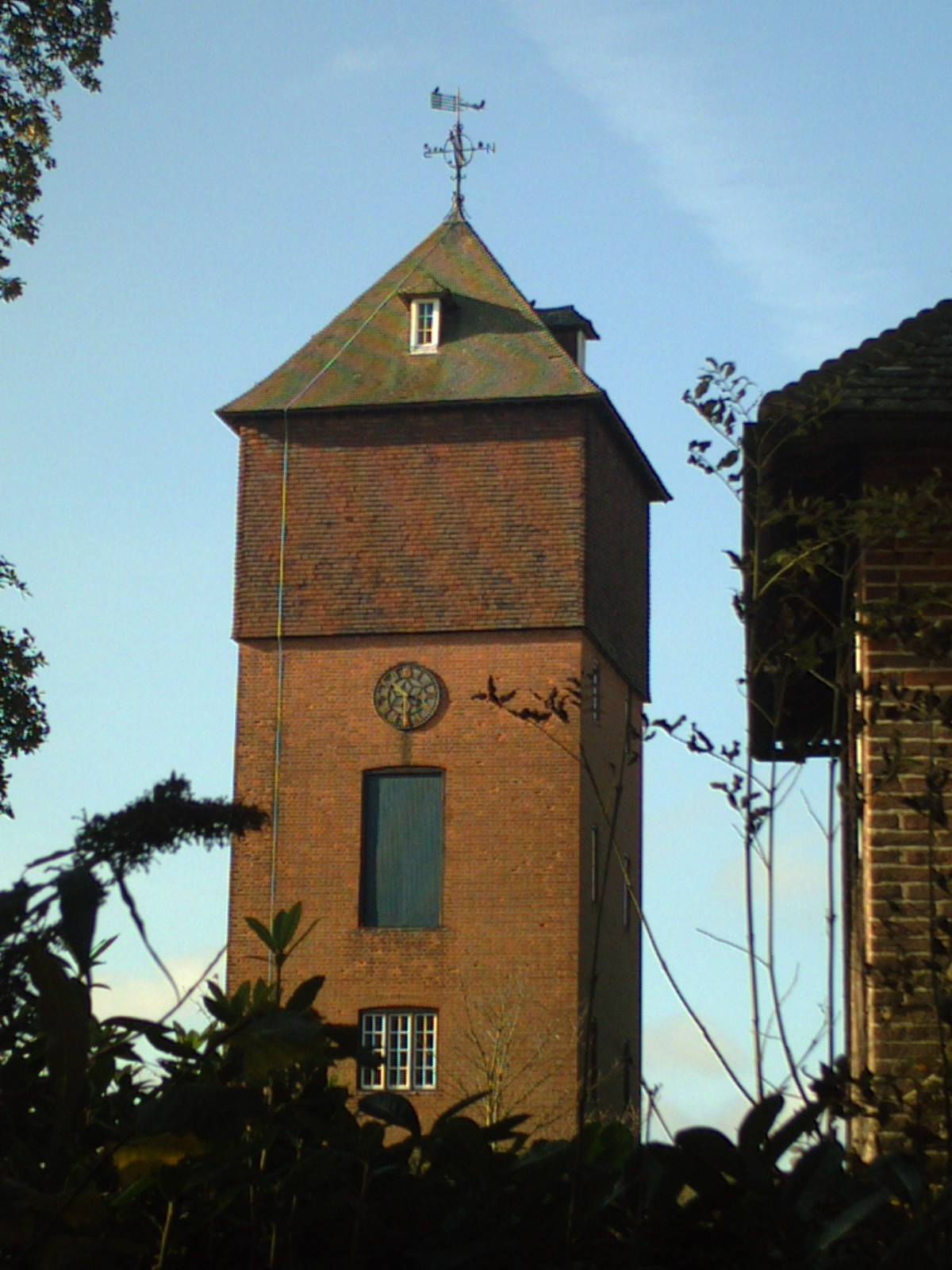
Exbury Water Tower built to provide water to the gardens

Exbury is a village in Hampshire, England. It is in the civil parish of Exbury and Lepe. It lies just in the New Forest, near the Beaulieu River and about a mile from the Solent coast. It is best known as the location of Exbury House, built by the Rothschild family, and the famous Exbury Gardens. The Rothschild family still have significant land ownings in the area.

== Overview ==
The village was originally in the southwest corner of the parish but moved inland in the early 19th century. The present village was built to provide homes for workers on the Exbury Estate and still does provide homes for a few workers but is now mainly private housing. A prominent feature of the village is a water tower which provided the water to the gardens that was used to water the plants. The parish church was built in 1827, replacing an earlier chapel near Lower Exbury Farm. Until 1863 Exbury was a chapelry in the parish of Fawley.

The village forms part of the civil parish of Exbury and Lepe, which in turn is part of the New Forest district of the county of Hampshire. The parish, district and county councils are responsible for different aspects of local administration.

== History ==
People have lived near Exbury since prehistoric times. An Iron-Age promontory fort is visible on the east bank of the Beaulieu River, where it is defended on the east side by a bank and outer ditch.

In the 13th century the Foliot family were holders of the Exbury in chief of the Crown. At the end of the century the estate was divided into two, but by the end of the 14th century both parts were in the hands of John de Bettesthorne. On the death of John de Bettesthorne in 1399, his inheritance passed to his daughter Elizabeth and her husband Sir John de Berkeley. It remained in the hands of the Berkeley family for most of the 15th century. At the end of that century the manor had passed to Katherine Berkeley, who had married John Brewerton, and it then descended to the Comptons of Compton Wynyates, Warwickshire, who held it for the next two hundred years.

In 1718 Exbury passed to William Mitford, and by the early 1800s it had descended to his grandson William Mitford the historian of Greece. William decided to build a new village at Upper Exbury. The original village and its chapel at Lower Exbury to the south-west were removed, and a site was designated for a new church, which was built in 1827. William Mitford died in 1827, and his grandson Henry Reveley Mitford succeeded to the estate. He sold it, in the 1880s, to Major John Forster. His son Henry William Forster inherited Exbury, living in Lepe House.

== Exbury House ==
In 1919 the eminent banker Lionel Nathan de Rothschild bought Exbury House, the house being nearly derelict at that time. The house was remodelled in 1927, and Lionel created a new garden, collecting plants from all over the world. When he died in 1942, the house was requisitioned by the Royal Navy and used for the planning and operation of the Dieppe raids and D-Day landings. Exbury estate was used for experimental firing, and barracks housing up to 300 men were constructed within the grounds. Lionel's son Edmund Leopold de Rothschild took on the responsibility for the estate after the war, restoring the house and gardens. Exbury Gardens opened to the public in 1955. When Edmund died in 2009, his brother Leopold David de Rothschild took over, creating a Charitable Trust to secure the financial future of the gardens and railway which opened in 2001.

== Church ==
The earliest mention of a chapel at Exbury is in 1291, when "Master Nicholas de Audeby" held the church of Fawley with the chapel of Exbury. The chapel of St. Katherine was at Lower Exbury. This chapel was served by the Cistercians from Beaulieu Abbey, the tradition being that the monks used to cross the river from Saint Leonard's on stepping-stones. The chapel was pulled down in 1827, when the present church at Exbury was built.

Exbury church is a stone structure with a northwest tower. It was consecrated in 1827. It contains a 13th-century font of Purbeck stone from the old church. To the east of the church is the family vault of the Mitfords.
