= Dark Water =

Dark Water may refer to:

== Books ==
- Darkwater: Voices from Within the Veil, 1920 book by American philosopher W.E.B. Du Bois
- Dark Water (book) (仄暗い水の底から; Honogurai mizu no soko kara; literally In the Depths of Dark Water), a collection of horror short stories by Koji Suzuki

== Films ==
- Two films based on the story "Floating Water" from Suzuki's book Dark Water:
  - Dark Water (2002 film), a Japanese horror film directed by Hideo Nakata
  - Dark Water (2005 film), a remake of the 2002 film directed by Walter Salles
- Dark Waters (2019 film), an American legal thriller film directed by Todd Haynes

== Music ==
- Darkwater (band), a Progressive Metal band from Sweden
- "Dark Water" (song), a 2014 song by Amy Lee featuring Malika Zarra

== Television ==
- Dark Water, also known as The Pirates of Dark Water, a 1990s American animated show
- "Dark Water" (Doctor Who), 2014 episode of the British TV series Doctor Who

== Other uses ==
- Dark Water (river), a river in the New Forest district of the English county of Hampshire
- Captain Darkwater, a character in the video game Ratchet & Clank Future: Quest for Booty
- Darkwater Island, fictional setting of the video game Call of Cthulhu

== See also ==
- Dark Waters (disambiguation)
