= Exbury and Lepe =

Civil parish in Hampshire, England

Coordinates: 50.8°N 1.383333°W

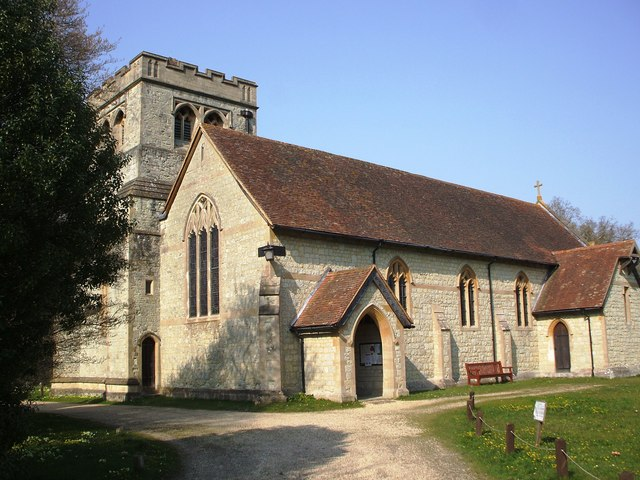
- Exbury church

- Location within Hampshire
- Population: 159 (2001); 174 (2011 Census)
- OS grid reference: SU434002
- Civil parish: Exbury and Lepe
- District: New Forest
- Shire county: Hampshire
- Region: South East
- Country: England
- Sovereign state: United Kingdom
- Post town: Southampton
- Postcode district: SO45
- Police: Hampshire and Isle of Wight
- Fire: Hampshire and Isle of Wight
- Ambulance: South Central
- UK Parliament: New Forest East

Exbury and Lepe is a civil parish in the New Forest in Hampshire, England. It is bounded to the west by the Beaulieu River, to the south by the shore of the Solent and to the east by the Dark Water. To the north it extends to the New Forest heathland. The parish includes the settlements of Exbury and Lepe.

The parish forms part of the New Forest district of the county of Hampshire. The parish, district and county councils are responsible for different aspects of local administration. The parish is within the New Forest East constituency of the United Kingdom Parliament. Prior to Brexit in 2020, it was represented by the South East England constituency for the European Parliament.

The parish has a population of 159 living in 78 households.
