= Dark Waters =

Dark Waters may refer to:

== Books and art ==
- Dark Waters, a book by Catherine MacPhail nominated for the 2002 Carnegie Medal
- "Dark Waters", an exhibition on the Thames for the London Festival of Architecture 2008

== Games ==
- "Dark Waters", a popular add-on for the Neverwinter Nights 2 computer game
- Risen 2: Dark Waters, a 2012 video game

== Film and TV ==
- Dark Waters (1944 film), a film starring Merle Oberon and Franchot Tone - a woman is targeted for her inheritance
- Dark Waters (1956 film), also known as Struggle in the Pier, an Egyptian film starring Omar Sharif
- Dark Waters (1994 film), a horror film
- Dark Waters (2019 film), directed by Todd Haynes, a legal thriller concerning chemical contamination of a town
- "Dark Waters" (Arrow), an episode of the fourth season of Arrow
- "Dark Waters" (Once Upon a Time), an episode of the sixth season of Once Upon a Time

== Music ==
- Dark Waters (album), a 2023 album by Delain
- Dark Waters, a 1950 opera by Ernst Krenek

=== Songs ===
- "Dark Waters", a song by Evergrey from the 2001 album In Search of Truth
- "Dark Waters", a song on the 2005 reissue album More Music for Films
- "Dark Waters", a song by God Forbid from the 1999 album Reject the Sickness
- "Dark Waters", a song by Tones and I from the 2021 album Welcome to the Madhouse

== See also ==
- Dark Water (disambiguation)
