= Sidmouth RNLI Lifeboat Station =

Former RNLI lifeboat station in Devon, England

Sidmouth Lifeboat Station

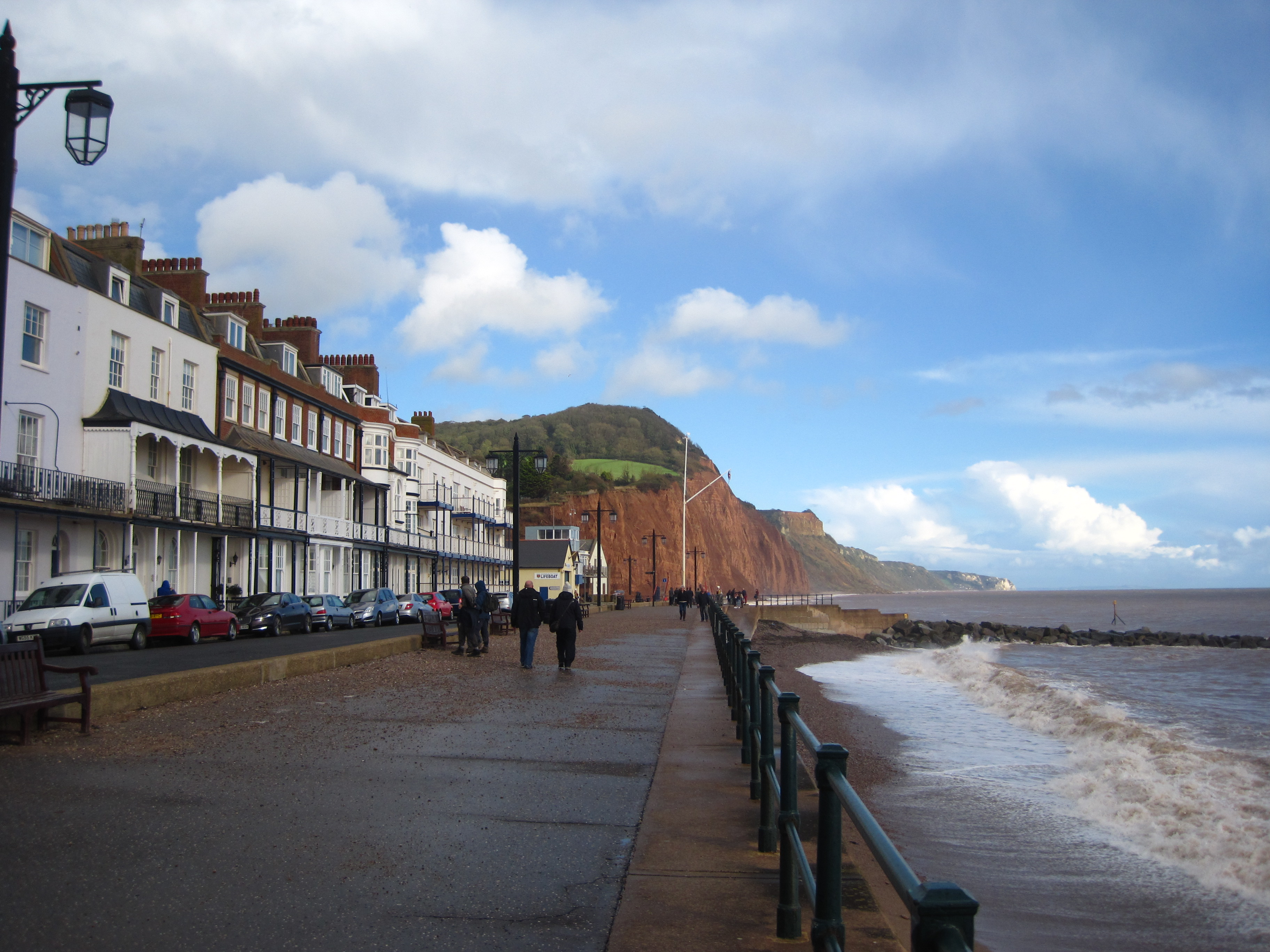
- Sidmouth Sea Front

- Sidmouth, Devon

General information
- Status: Closed
- Type: Lifeboat Station
- Location: The Esplanade, Sidmouth, Devon, EX10 8BE, England
- Coordinates: 50°40′43.1″N 3°14′07.8″W
- Opened: 25 September 1869
- Closed: 1912

Sidmouth RNLI Lifeboat Station, was located on the west corner of Ham Lane, now York Street, and The Esplanade, in Sidmouth, a seaside town located mid-way between Exmouth and Lyme Regis on the Jurassic Coast of south-east Devon.

A lifeboat was first placed at Sidmouth in 1869, by the Royal National Lifeboat Institution (RNLI).

After 43 years of operation, Sidmouth RNLI lifeboat station was closed in 1912.

In 1968, a new independent lifeboat station was re-established at Sidmouth, Sidmouth Independent Lifeboat. It operates from a building on the east corner of the York Street junction, directly across from the location of the old RNLI boathouse.

== History ==
Ever since its founding in 1824, the Royal National Institution for the Preservation of Life from Shipwreck (RNIPLS), later to become the RNLI in 1854, would award medals for deeds of gallantry at sea, even if no lifeboats were involved.

On 19 May 1838, the Sidmouth coastguard boat was launched with seven crew, to the aid of the schooner Agnes of Guernsey. Nearing the vessel, the boat was swamped, and all aboard were washed overboard. With some injuries sustained, all made it safely ashore. The vessel was later driven ashore, but the Master and six crew were rescued. Lt. John Rothery, RN, H.M. Coastguard, Sidmouth, was awarded the RNIPLS Silver Medal.

However, it would be thirty years later, on 8 April 1868, that a report about lifeboat coverage at Sidmouth was presented to the RNLI committee of management by Capt. John R. Ward, Inspector of Lifeboats. At a subsequent meeting on 6 May 1868, it was decided to establish a new lifeboat station at Sidmouth, Devon, with the cooperation of local residents, "who were anxious that Sidmouth should be provided with a life-boat, that they might be in a position to succour the crews of any vessels that might be wrecked there".

A sum of £420 had been donated to the Institution by Mrs Rimington of Streatham, and this was appropriated to the Sidmouth lifeboat station. A boathouse was constructed on The Esplanade, and a 33-foot self-righting 'Pulling and Sailing' (P&S) lifeboat, with sails and (10) oars, double-banked, was sent to the station along with its transporting carriage. At a ceremony on 25 September 1869, the lifeboat was named Rimington, in front of a crowd of several thousand.

On the 5 September 1873, the brig Frederick William was showing distress signals whilst at anchor off Sidmouth. The first attempt to launch the lifeboat resulted in her being thrown broadside back onto the beach, but a second attempt then followed, and eight men were brought ashore. On 31 December 1873, 11 men were rescued from the barque Emmeline of Bordeaux in Seaton Bay, some 8 miles (13 km) to the east of Sidmouth, and landed at Beer, Devon.

Rimington was launched on the afternoon of the 7 August 1877, and six men were rescued from the schooner Wave of Guernsey.

A replacement lifeboat was placed at Sidmouth in 1886. The 34-foot self-righting lifeboat was funded from the gift of £1000 from Miss Bass, of Dalston, East London, and at the donors request, was named William and Frances (ON 40).

On the morning of 7 December 1911, in gale force conditions, the schooner Maria of Geestemunde was seen flying signals of distress, some 12 miles (19 km) off Sidmouth. The vessel had been under tow from Poole to Teignmouth, and had lost both the tow, and the tugboat. With the assistance of the lifeboat crew, the vessel and 6 crew was taken to Lyme Regis, managing to enter the harbour the following day. The lifeboat would remain at Lyme Regis until conditions calmed the following day, arriving home at 17:30 on the 9 December.

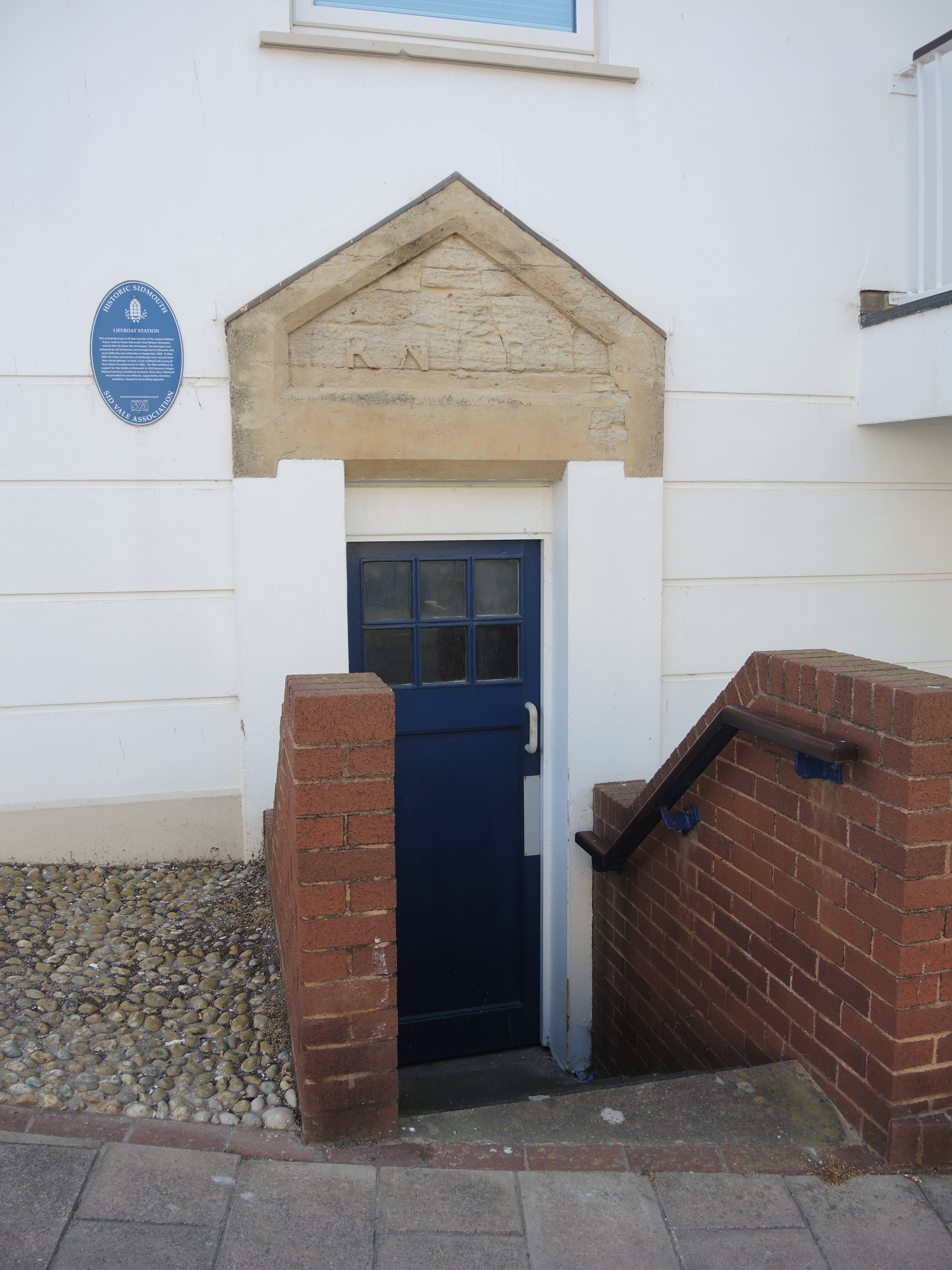
RNLBI Archway of the Old Station

At a meeting of the RNLI committee of management on 13 June 1912, with regard to the visit to Sidmouth by the Deputy Inspector of Lifeboats, and his subsequent report, it was decided to close Sidmouth Lifeboat Station.

The lifeboat station was later demolished, and a new building constructed, but the old stone arch from the boathouse door, bearing the initials RNLBI (Royal National Life-Boat Institution), was incorporated into the new building. The lifeboat on station at the time of closure, the 26-year-old William and Frances (ON 40), was sold from service.

== Sidmouth Independent Lifeboat ==
In 1968, a new independent lifeboat station was re-established at Sidmouth, Sidmouth Independent Lifeboat. It operates from a building on the east corner of the York Street junction, directly across from the location of the old RNLI boathouse. For further information on the current rescue service, please see:

- Sidmouth Lifeboat

== Station honours ==
The following are awards made at Sidmouth.

- RNIPLS Silver Medal

Lt. John Rothery, RN, H.M. Coastguard, Sidmouth – 1838

- Lloyd's Medal for Saving Life at Sea, Silver

Lt. John Rothery, RN, H.M. Coastguard, Sidmouth – 1838

== Sidmouth RNLI lifeboats ==
ON (Note: ON is the RNLI's Official Number of the boat.)	Name	Built	On station	Class	Comments
Pre-526	Rimington	1869	1869–1885	33-foot Peake Self-righting (P&S)	(Note: 33-foot x 8-foot 6in (10-oared) Peake-class self-righting (P&S) lifeboat, legacy of Mrs Rimington of Streatham, built by Woolfe of Shadwell, London, costing £283.)
40	William and Frances	1885	1885–1912	34-foot Self-righting (P&S)	(Note: 34-foot x 8-foot (10-oared) self-righting (P&S) lifeboat, gift of Miss Bass of Dalston, built by Woolfe of Shadwell, London, costing £345.)

Pre ON numbers are unofficial numbers used by the Lifeboat Enthusiast Society to reference early lifeboats not included on the official RNLI list.

== See also ==
- List of former RNLI stations
- List of RNLI stations
- Independent lifeboats in Britain and Ireland
