= Lepe, Hampshire =

Hamlet in Hampshire, England

Coordinates: 50.785°N 1.361°W

Lepe
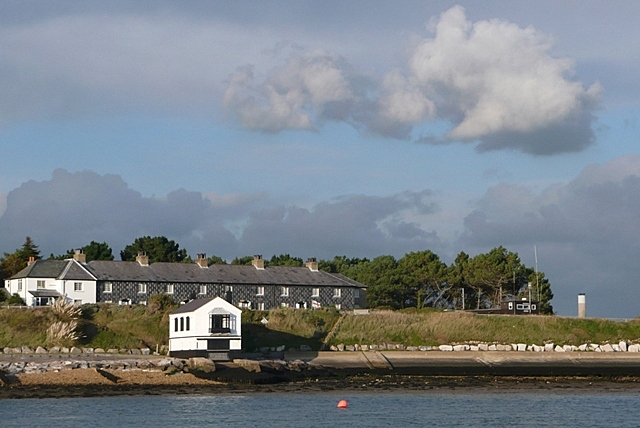
- View towards the Coastguard cottages, Lepe

- Location within Hampshire
- OS grid reference: SZ450986
- Civil parish: Exbury and Lepe
- District: New Forest
- Shire county: Hampshire
- Region: South East
- Country: England
- Sovereign state: United Kingdom
- Post town: SOUTHAMPTON
- Postcode district: SO45
- Dialling code: 023
- Police: Hampshire and Isle of Wight
- Fire: Hampshire and Isle of Wight
- Ambulance: South Central
- UK Parliament: New Forest East

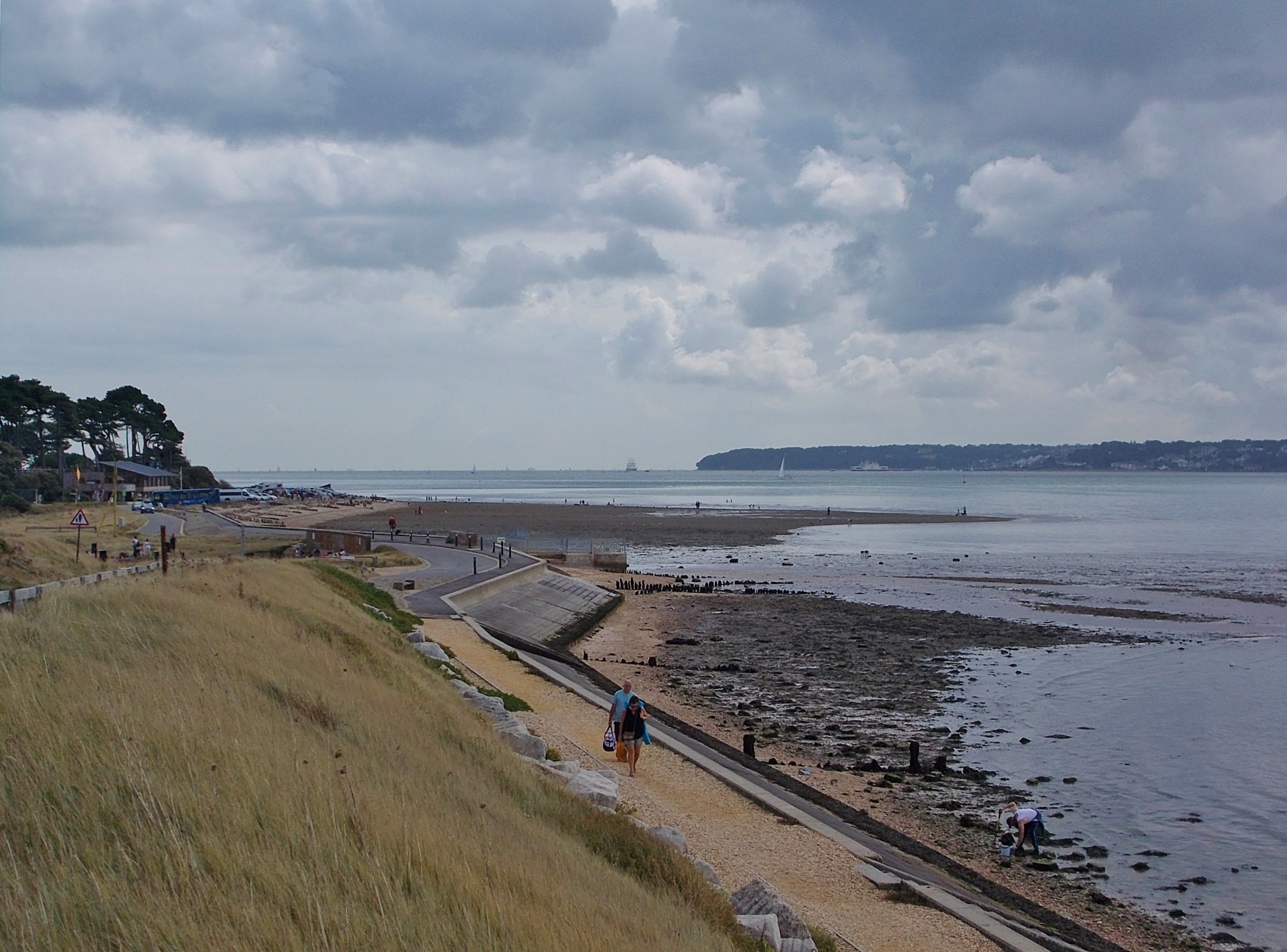
The beach at Lepe

Lepe is a linear hamlet on the Solent in south-west Hampshire, England. In the civil parish of Exbury and Lepe, It is beside the Dark Water, and has Lepe Country Park, which runs from Stanswood Bay to the mouth of the Beaulieu River.

== Overview ==
Lepe is a hamlet on north-west shore of the Solent. It is part of the civil parish of Exbury and Lepe, which in turn is part of the New Forest district of Hampshire. The civil parish is coextensive with the Church of England parish of Exbury which maintains one church, as since early medieval times, at Exbury. The east side is Lepe Country Park, with a mile of beach, pine-fringed cliffs, Operation Overlord remains (see below), year-round café-and-shop, and wild flower meadows;

From the cliffs above the beach, part of the view of the Western Solent is used by Solent Rescue Independent Lifeboat station. Inchmery Quay lies to the west.

== History ==
Lepe may have been a port in Roman times, since there is evidence of a Roman road down the eastern side of the New Forest from Shorn Hill, Totton, to Lepe.

Lepe is first recorded in the 13th century. The name may refer to a human leap over the Dark Water. For the centuries when manorial rights were the parent form of estate in most land, it was long part of Exbury manor, which in latter decades was frequently called the "manor of Exbury and Lepe."

Oral history ascribes a populous seaside hamlet to Lepe washed away by a great storm before the early 1700s; a ruined harbour, Stone Point, is spoken of. Old maps shows the Dark Water mouth was more easterly, near Stone Point. An estate map of 1640 shows a tidal mill there, and the tidal pond is still identifiable. The change may have been from the Great Storm of 1703 when the south coast of England was ravaged for five days.

Lepe harbour survived, and in 1744 shipbuilder Moody Janverin was asked by the Admiralty to create a shipyard there. Among ships built there were:

- HMS Greenwich (1747)
- HMS Fowey (1749)
- HMS Europa (1765).

It had silted up by 1825.

Around this time Lepe was involved in the oyster trade, large heaps being stacked here to purify. A wooden quay was built at Lepe to serve the local brickyards until the coastal trade dropped given the advent of railways. A Lepe coastguard station to combat west Solent smuggling. Completed in 1828, the Coastguard Cottages and the Watch House remain largely unchanged today.

In the 18th century, Lepe House was an inn, The Ship Inn. It was later enlarged and beautified to become a grand country house. In 1943, it was requisitioned by the Royal Navy, hosting the J.1 Assault Group for the D-Day landings to restore Normandy to free French rule in June 1944.

Localised flooding has occurred in 2004, 2005 and in 2014.

== Lepe and D-Day, 1944 ==
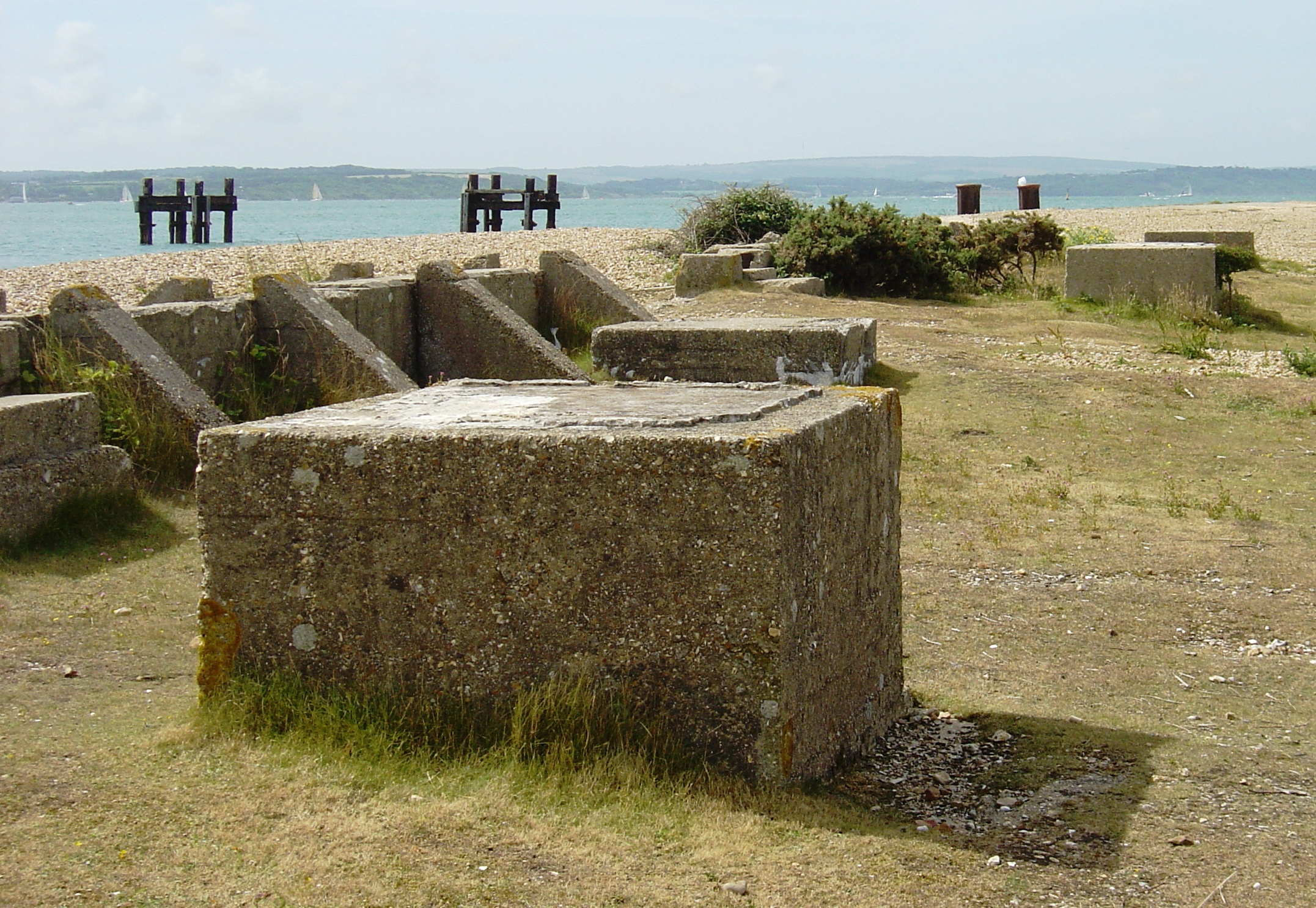
World War II ruins on Lepe beach

Lepe was used as a secret manufacturing site. Six massive concrete caissons (type B2 Phoenix breakwaters) were built here then towed across the Channel where they formed part of the Mulberry harbours used after D-Day. Lepe was also one of the many places of embarkation of troops and equipment. Concrete mats shaped like big chocolate blocks reinforced the shingle beach for heavy vehicles. Some remain, as do pier remnants and concrete and brick structures.

Lepe beach was where PLUTO (Pipelines Under The Ocean) left the mainland: carrying fuel across to the Isle of Wight and under the English Channel to the Allied forces in Normandy and beyond.
