= Exbury House =

Country house in Exbury, Hampshire, England

Exbury House, Hampshire
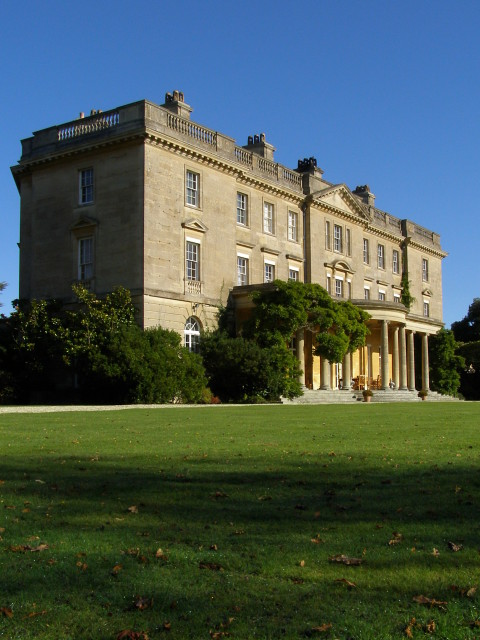
- Interactive map of the Exbury House, Hampshire area

General information
- Type: Country House
- Location: Exbury and Lepe, Hampshire, England
- Coordinates: 50.798505°N 1.400004°W

Design and construction
- Designations: Grade II* listed

Exbury House is an English country house in Exbury and Lepe, Hampshire, situated on the edge of the New Forest.

It is a Grade II* listed building with associated Grade II* listed parkland and gardens.

The house consists of an 18th-century core which was redesigned and refaced in 1927. Constructed of brick and ashlar with a slate roof, it has a rectangular floor plan (with one corner sliced off), three storeys and a parapet around the roof. The long side garden frontage has nine bays and a colonnaded entrance. The main entrance front on the sliced-off corner has five bays.

The gardens (see Exbury Gardens) were laid out by Lionel de Rothschild between 1919 and 1939 and contain specialist collections of rhododendrons and other species. Whilst the gardens are open to the public, the house is not.

== History ==
Exbury Manor dates from the 13th century. It belonged to the Berkeley family in the 15th century and the Compton family of Compton Wynyates in Warwickshire in the 16th. In 1708 it passed to William Mitford and thence down to his grandson, the historian William Mitford (1744–1827). On the latter's death it passed directly to his grandson Henry Reveley Mitford (1804–1883), whose father had been drowned at sea in 1803 after his ship hit Bell Rock. It was sold to Major John Forster in the early 1880s, but after his death in 1886, it was let to Bertram Freeman-Mitford, 1st Baron Redesdale, and his wife, Lady Clementine (née Ogilvy) in the 1880s. Major Forster also let the house to George Stucley for a number of years. Forster's son sold it to the financier Lionel de Rothschild in 1919.

Rothschild remodelled and upgraded the house, developed the gardens and extended the village of Exbury. He died in 1942 and the house was requisitioned by the Royal Navy as a headquarters to prepare for Operation Neptune. The house was designated as HMS Mastodon from May 1942 to July 1945, HMS King Alfred January to June 1946, then HMS Hawke from August 1946 to 1955.

The house was finally returned to the Rothschild family in 1955 and Rothschild's son Edmund was able to renew the plant breeding program. The house itself was not reoccupied as a private residence until 1989.

The gardens have been open to the public since 1950, run since 1988 by Exbury Gardens Ltd on a long lease from the Rothschild family.

Janet Prentice, the heroine of Nevil Shute's novel Requiem for a Wren, finds herself, as a Wren specialist in landing craft guns, assigned to HMS Mastodon in 1943. In the novel, Shute identifies Mastodon as Exbury, and describes the wonder of Prentice and a fellow Wren when they first arrive at the grand river-front house and explore its gardens. Among other things, they find underground irrigation systems, carefully labelled plants, and "... a rock garden half as large as Trafalgar Square that was a mass of bloom ..." All of this, says Shute, was tended by a gardening staff that "... had been reduced from fifty to a mere eighteen old men."
