= Gull Island (Hampshire) =

Island in Hampshire, England

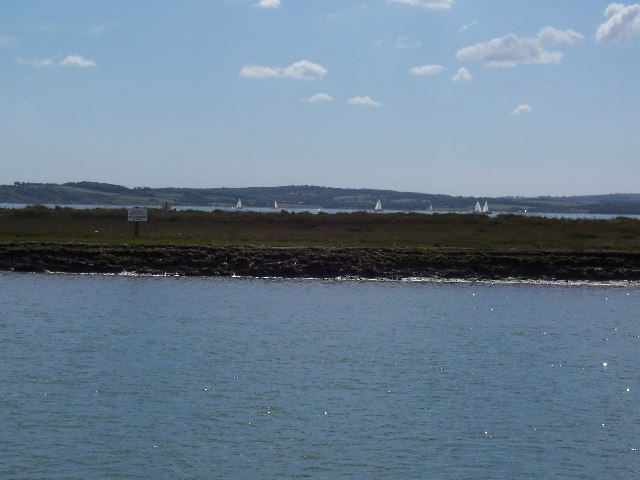
- Looking SE towards Gull Island with the Isle of Wight in the background

- Location within Hampshire

Geography
- Location: The Solent
- Coordinates: 50.780°N 1.384°W
- Length: 1.0 km (0.62 mi)
- Width: 0.2 km (0.12 mi)

Administration
- England
- County: Hampshire
- District: New Forest

Demographics
- Population: 0

Gull Island is a small uninhabited island at the mouth of the Beaulieu River in The Solent. The island is an area of raised ground approximately 1,000 metres long and up to around 180 metres wide amid the tidal sands to the east of Needs Ore Point, and separates the river from the sea for its final stretch before entering The Solent. It forms part of the civil parish of Beaulieu.

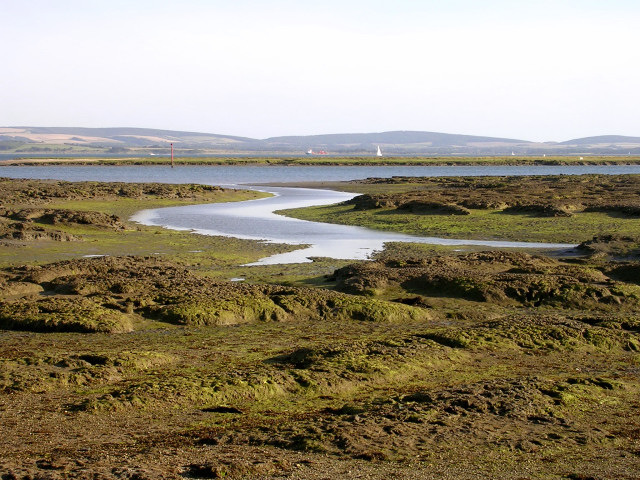
Looking across the short Exbury River and larger Beaulieu River to Gull Island, with the Isle of Wight in the background

The island acts as shelter for the final kilometre of the Beaulieu River against all but strong easterly currents and so provides moorings for boats on its northern side.

Consisting primarily of salt marshes, Gull Island is a relatively new feature of the area and is not shown on Ordnance Survey maps of the 19th century. In 1985, with a view to protecting the salt marshes on the northern side of the Beaulieu River, the Beaulieu estate passed a bill to parliament requesting permission to build a shingle barrier joining the west of the island to the mainland at Warren Farm Spit, cutting off the "Bull Run" channel previously used by yachts. By 1992 the artificial causeway had been completed, extending along the southern end of Gull Island, although erosion of the island continues and will eventually remove all of Gull Island's marshes.

The island currently serves as a nature reserve and bird sanctuary.
