= River Axe =

River Axe may refer to:

- River Axe (Lyme Bay), an English river flowing south through Axminster to the English Channel in Lyme Bay near Seaton
- River Axe (Bristol Channel), an English river flowing west from the Mendip Hills to the Bristol Channel near Weston-super-Mare
