= Sidmouth Lifeboat =

Lifeboat station in Devon, England

Sidmouth Lifeboat Station
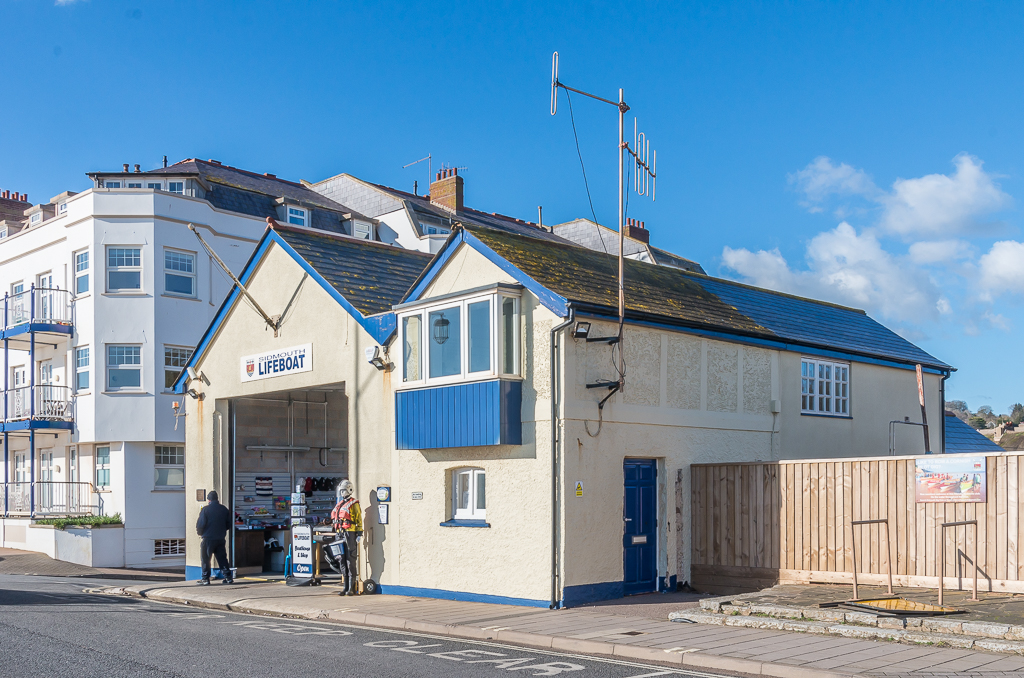

- Sidmouth on the south coast of Devon

General information
- Type: Lifeboat station
- Location: Sidmouth, The Esplanade, Sidmouth, Devon, EX10 8BE, United Kingdom
- Coordinates: 50.6785°N 3.2360°W
- Owner: Sidmouth Lifeboat

Website
- www.sidmouthlifeboat.org.uk

Sidmouth Lifeboat is a fully self-funded independent lifeboat charity in East Devon that provides lifeboat and lifeguard services, and is located at The Esplanade in Sidmouth, a town approximately 15 miles (24 km) east of Exeter, on the Jurassic Coast of Devon, England.

A lifeboat station was established at Sidmouth in 1869 by the Royal National Lifeboat Institution (RNLI), operating until its closure in 1912.

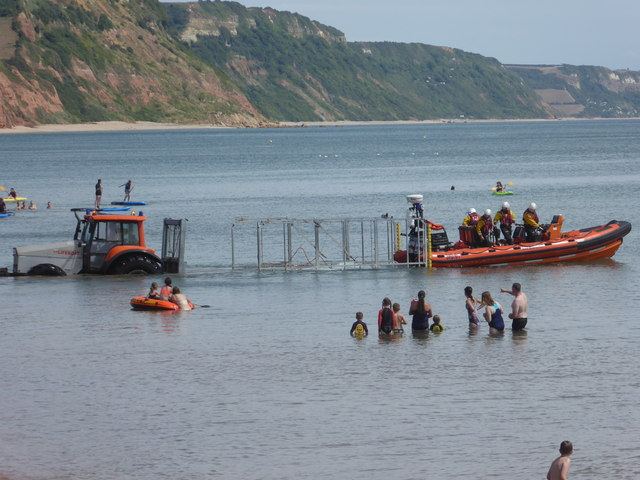
Launching the Pride of Sidmouth

A new Independent Lifeboat station was established in 1968, and since 2019, its principal lifeboat is currently an Arctic 24 RIB named Peter & Barbara Truesdale. Sidmouth Independent Lifeboat is not part of, or funded by the RNLI, although it does have close links to the RNLI through the nature of its work. Sidmouth Lifeboat is funded entirely by the community in and around the Sid Valley and friends of Sidmouth Lifeboat from further away.

== History ==
The RNLI had established stations at Lyme Regis in 1853 and at Exmouth in 1858. In 1869, Sidmouth RNLI Lifeboat Station was opened, to cover the coast between the two locations. A boathouse was built at the end of Ham Lane, which housed two lifeboats at different times.

The Sidmouth RNLI lifeboat saved 38 lives, but by 1912, it was rarely called out and the station was closed. The boathouse was later demolished, but a stone carved with the initials 'RNLBI' was saved and is now over a doorway of the building that stands on the site.

== Independent service ==
Students at a local secondary school set up a beach lifesaving organisation in 1968 and a rigid inflatable lifeboat was purchased in 1972. The organisation was accredited with the Coastguard as a rescue facility in 1982. A boathouse was built on The Esplanade when it obtained a new lifeboat in 1991. The lifeboat covers Lyme Bay between Budleigh Salterton and Axmouth.

== Sidmouth independent lifeboats ==
No.	Name	At Sidmouth	Class	Comments
		1972–1981	Atlantic 16	
	Spirit of Sidmouth	1981–1998	Humber	
	Sidmouth Herald	1998–2004	Atlantic 21	Purchased from the RNLI, Operational Number B-577.
SID-07	Pride of Sidmouth	2004–2019	Arctic 24	
	Speedy Sid		MilproAvon Sea Rider	
SID-08	Peter & Barbara Truesdale	2019–	Arctic 24	

The Arctic 24 lifeboats are 7.66 m (25.1 ft) long and can carry four crew with eight survivors. Sidmouth Lifeboat also operates a 4.2 m (14 ft) MilproAvon Sea Rider boat which is known as Speedy Sid.

== See also ==
- Independent lifeboats in Britain and Ireland
- List of former RNLI stations
