= Dark Water (river) =

River in south-west Hampshire, England

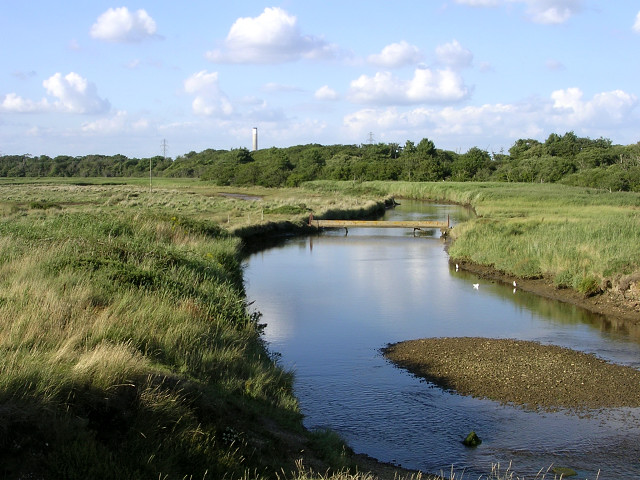
- Dark Water river and marsh, Lepe Country Park

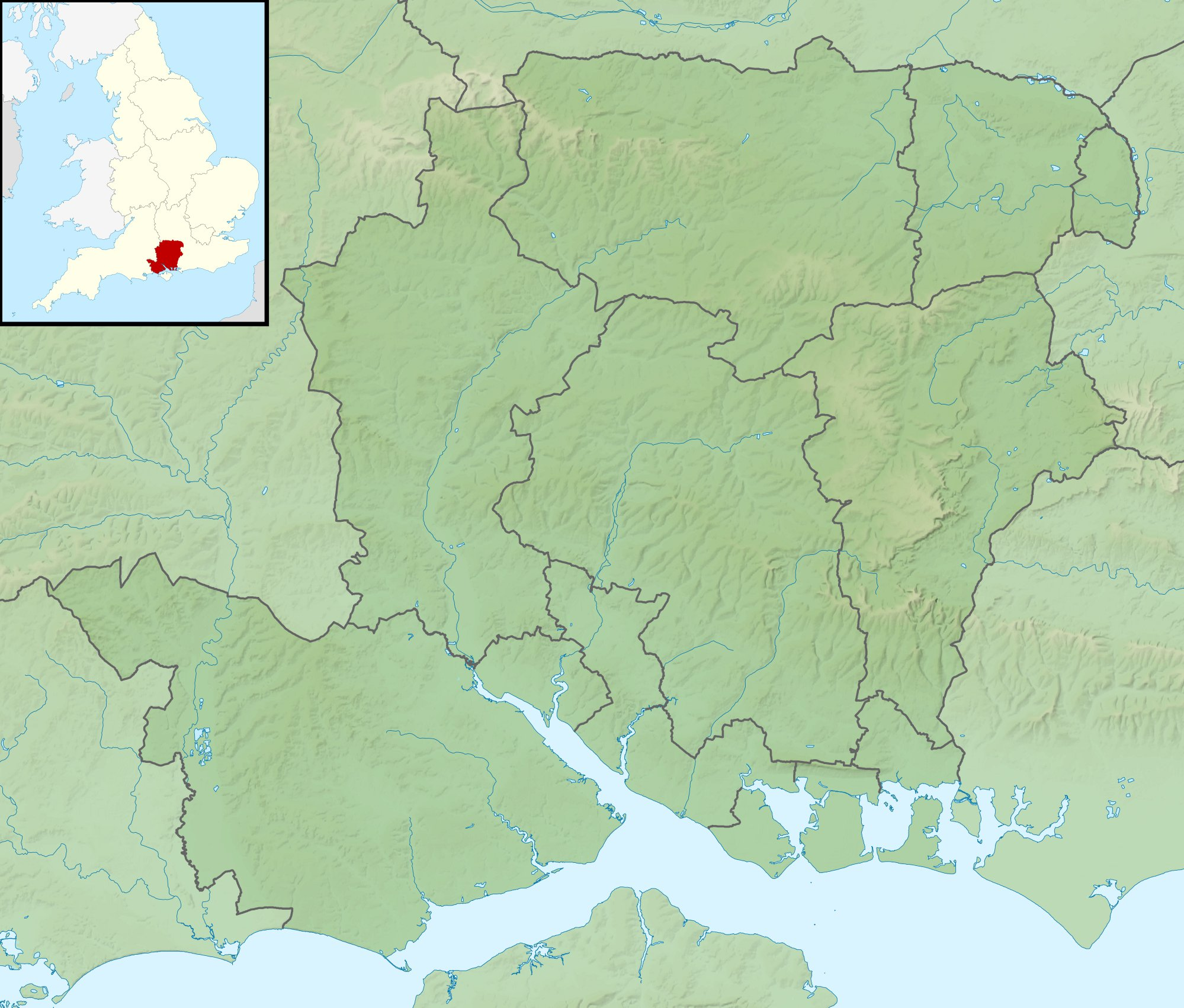
- Location within Hampshire

Location
- Country: England
- County: Hampshire
- District: New Forest

Physical characteristics
- Source
  - location: North of the south limits of Dibden Purlieu with New Forest National Park
  - coordinates: 50.8478°N 1.4072°W
  - elevation: 38 metres (125 ft)
- Mouth: Solent
  - location: Lepe
  - coordinates: 50.7845°N 1.3592°W
  - elevation: 0 metres
- Length: 5.5 m (18 ft)

Basin features
- Progression: Dark Water, Beaulieu River estuary, Solent (off English Channel off Atlantic Ocean)
- River system: Dark Water basin
- Tributaries
  - right: Stock Water

The Dark Water is a 5.5-mile (8.9 km) river in south-west Hampshire, England. It flows south from a source a few metres north-east of the New Forest, reaching the sea through the end of the Beaulieu River estuary, next to the Solent, at Lepe, part of the national park.

Its drainage basin reduces towards its mouth. It drains (with its main tributary, Stock Water) most of the largely heathland forest's "Beaulieu Heath". It then drains smaller Blackwell Common (the south of which was called Blackfield Common after neighbouring Blackfield). Then it drains the similar combined area: Horsemoor Copse, West Common (a meadow) and Chale Wood, below which narrow woods line one or both of the banks, beyond an inner marshy zone.
