= Beaulieu River =

River in Hampshire, England

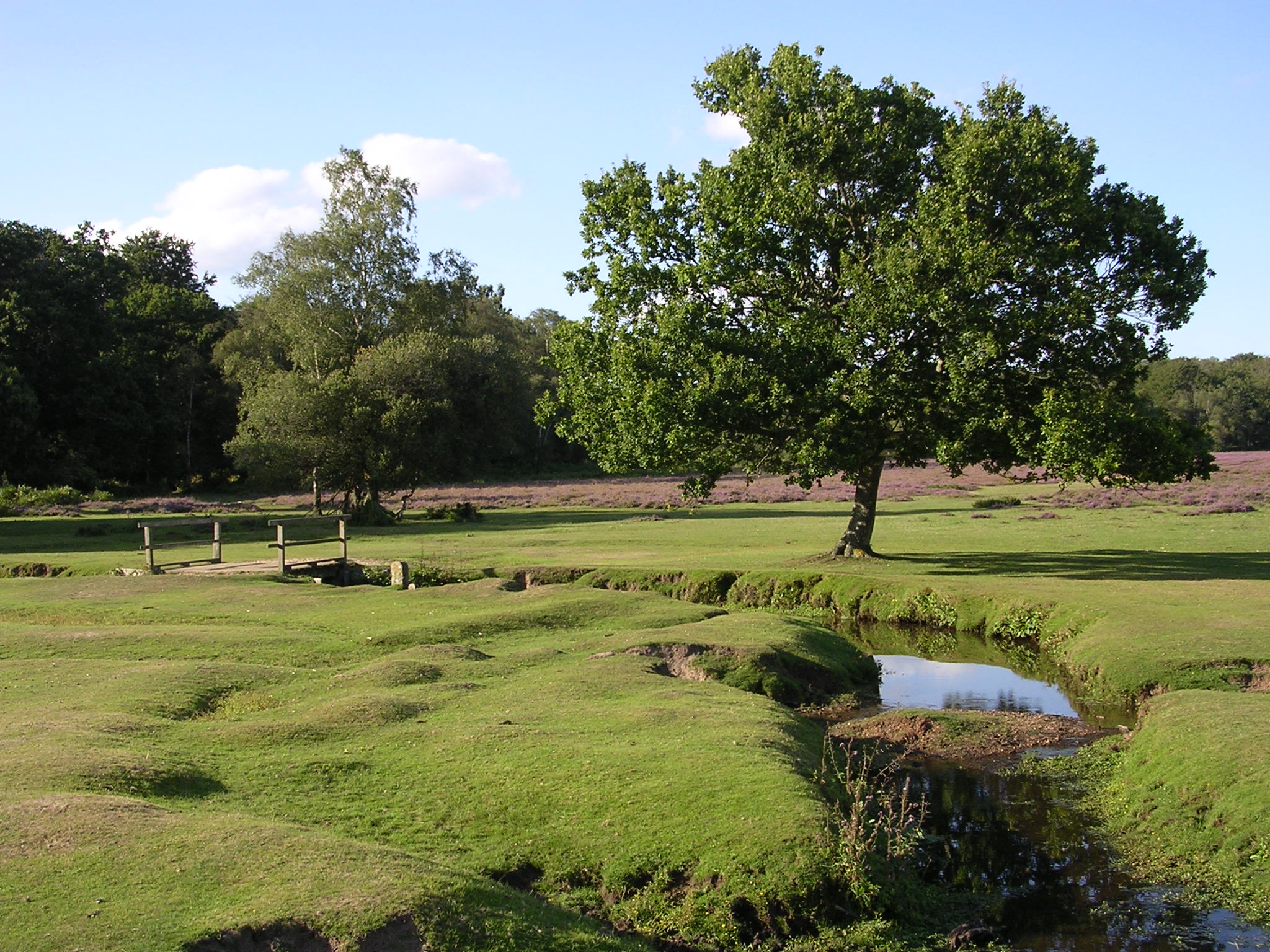
- The Beaulieu River at Longwater Lawn, near Lyndhurst

Location
- Country: England
- Region: Hampshire
- District: New Forest

Physical characteristics
- Source
  - location: Lyndhurst, Hampshire
  - coordinates: 50°52′47″N 1°34′55″W
- Mouth
  - location: Needs Ore Point, Hampshire
  - coordinates: 50°46′16″N 1°23′30″W
- Length: 20 km (12 mi)

Basin features
- Tributaries
  - left: Beaulieu Abbey Stream
  - right: Hatchet Stream

The Beaulieu River (/ˈbjuːli/ BEW-lee), previously known as the River Exe, is a small river draining much of the central New Forest in Hampshire, southern England. The river has many small upper branches and its furthest source is 8 miles (13 km) from its 4 miles (6 km)-long tidal estuary. The river, including its bed, is owned by Lord Montagu of Beaulieu.

== Etymology ==
The current name, Beaulieu, is French, meaning "beautiful place". The original name, Exe, is Brythonic, deriving from the Ancient British word *iska meaning "fishes" or "fish-place" and cognate with the archaic Welsh word pysg (fish, fishes). This derivation applies to many similarly named rivers throughout Britain including the Axe, Exe and Usk, with the names evolving local distinctions over the centuries.

== Course ==
The Beaulieu River rises near Lyndhurst in the centre of the New Forest, a zone where copses and scattered trees interrupt the relatively neutral sandy heath soil, but with insufficient organic uneroded deposition over millennia to prevent an upper charismatic dendritic drainage basin of many small streams. This explains the multitude of tiny headwaters across the New Forest. Many coalesce into the flow southeast and then south across the forest heaths to the village of Beaulieu. There the river becomes tidal and once drove a tide mill in the village. The mill ceased operations in 1942. Below, the tidal river (estuary) continues to flow southeast through the Forest, passing the hamlet of Bucklers Hard and entering the Solent at Needs Ore. For its final kilometre, it is separated from The Solent by a raised salt marsh known as Gull Island.

Below Beaulieu village, the river is navigable to small craft. Bucklers Hard was once a significant shipbuilding centre, constructing numerous wooden sailing ships, both merchant and naval, including Nelson's Agamemnon. Since 2000, the navigable channel at the entrance to the river has been marked by a lighthouse known as the Millennium Lighthouse or the Beaulieu River Beacon.

== Tributaries ==
The river has two tributaries, the Beaulieu Abbey Stream to the left and the Hatchet Stream to the right. In addition, there are a series of artificial lakes near the mouth of the river, known as the Black Lagoons.

== Water quality ==
The Environment Agency measures the water quality of the river systems in England. Each is given an overall ecological status, which may be one of five levels: high, good, moderate, poor and bad. There are several components that are used to determine this, including biological status, which looks at the quantity and varieties of invertebrates, angiosperms and fish. Chemical status, which compares the concentrations of various chemicals against known safe concentrations, is rated good or fail.

The water quality of the Beaulieu River was as follows in 2019:

Section	Ecological Status	Chemical Status	Overall Status	Length	Catchment	Channel
Beaulieu River	Good	Fail	Moderate	20.0 km (12.4 mi)	3.075 km^{2} (1.187 sq mi)	Heavily modified
Hatchet Stream	Moderate	Fail	Moderate	7.916 km (4.919 mi)	9.523 km^{2} (3.677 sq mi)	Heavily modified
Beaulieu Abbey Stream	Moderate	Fail	Moderate	2.535 km (1.575 mi)	2.253 km^{2} (0.870 sq mi)	Heavily modified
Black Lagoons	Good	Fail	Moderate		0.119 km^{2} (0.046 sq mi)	Artificial

== Film appearances ==
The river was used as a backdrop for some scenes of the 1966 film A Man for All Seasons. The tree-lined waters were used to portray the 16th century River Thames.

== Gallery ==
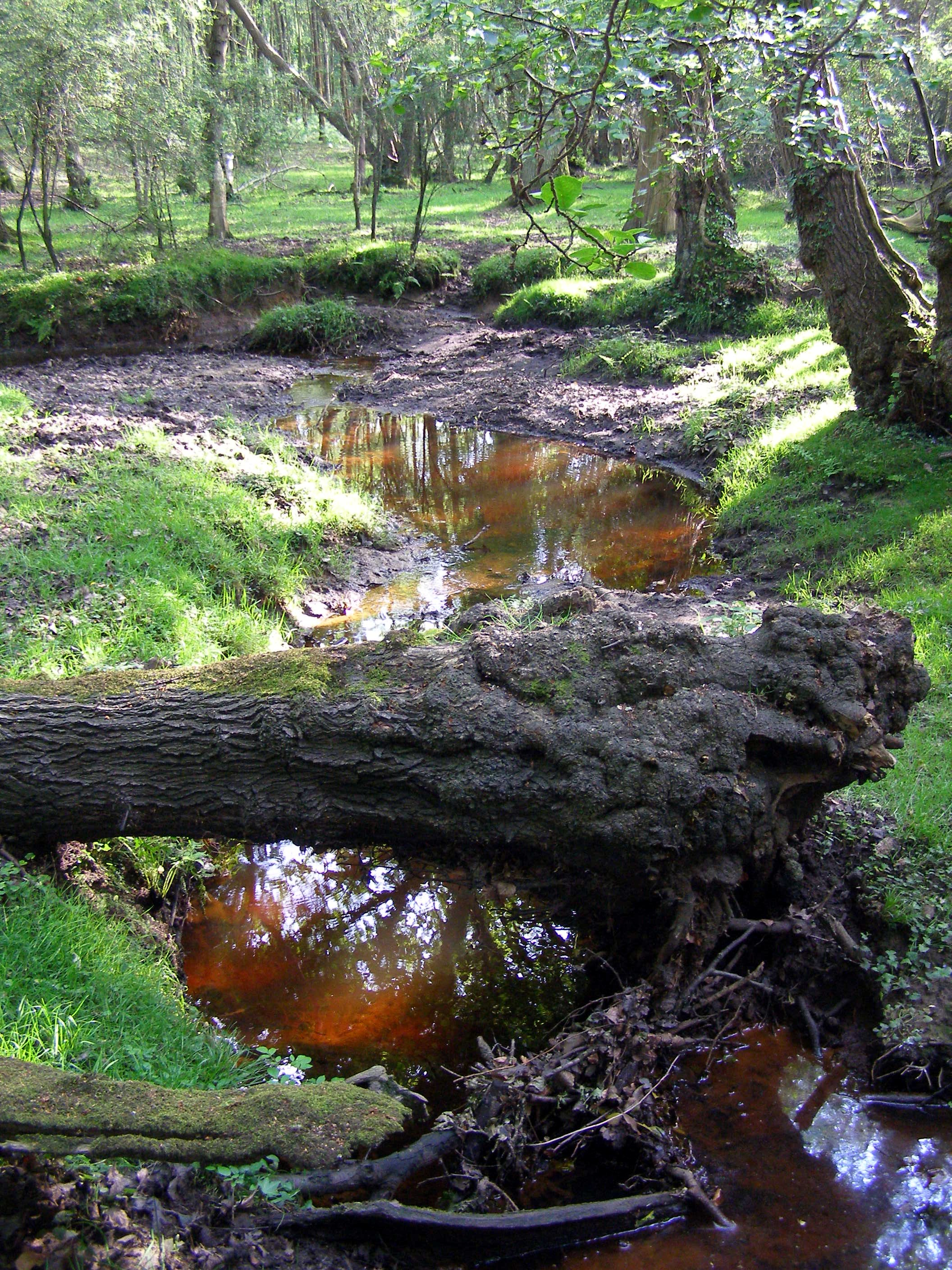
The infant river upstream from Dunces Arch

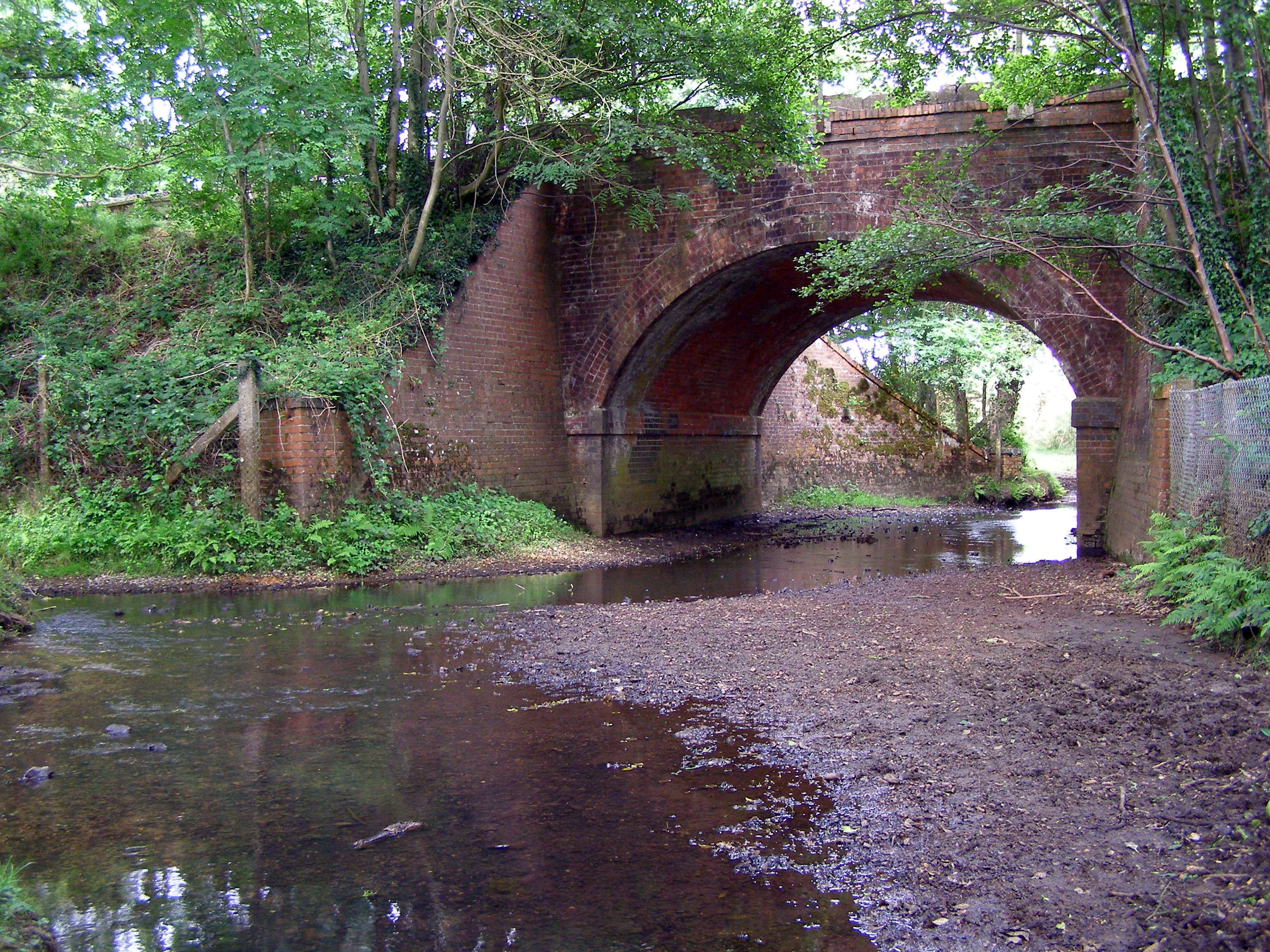
The river passes beneath the railway, north of Fulliford Passage

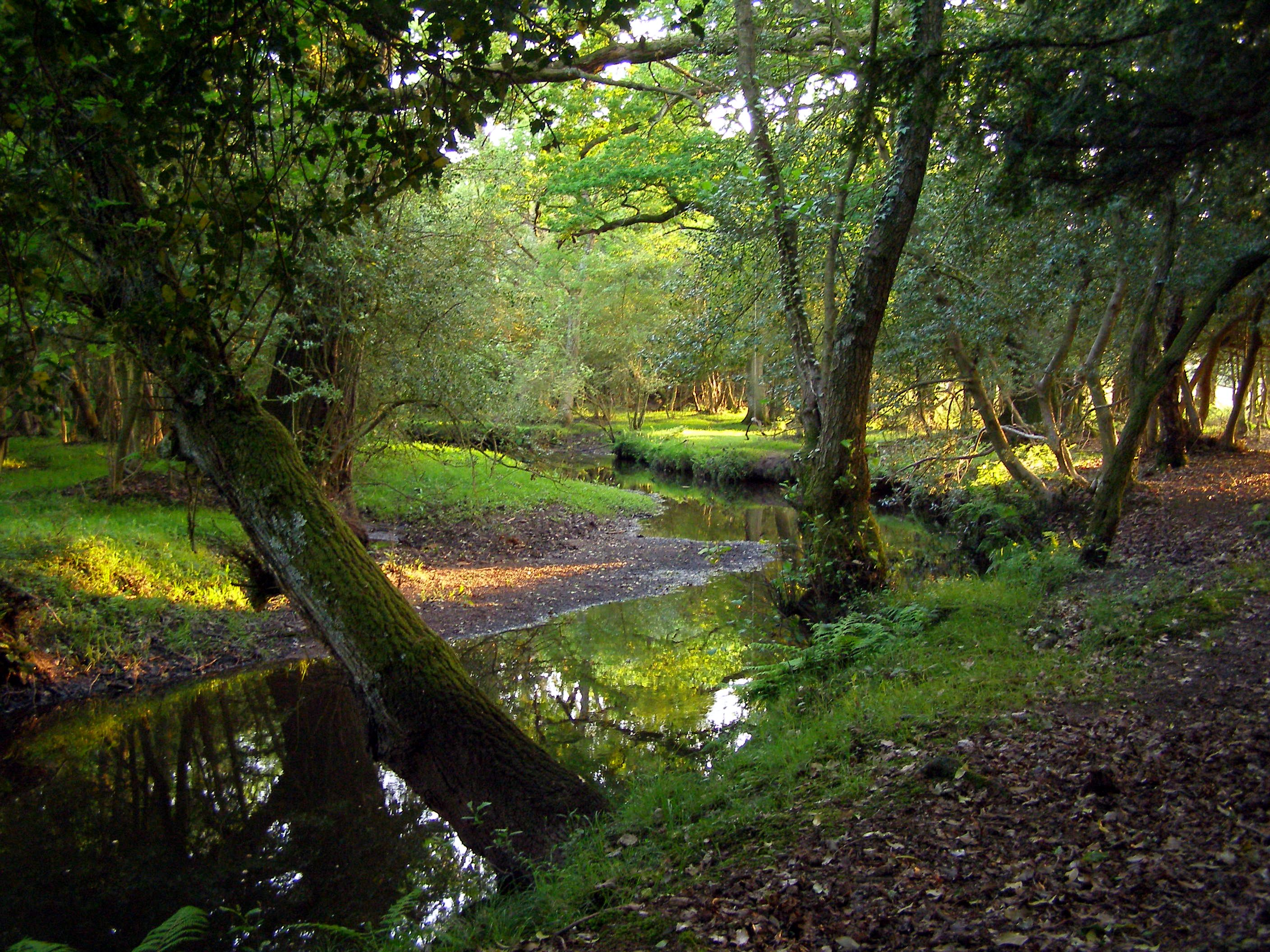
Bend in the river near Pottern Ford

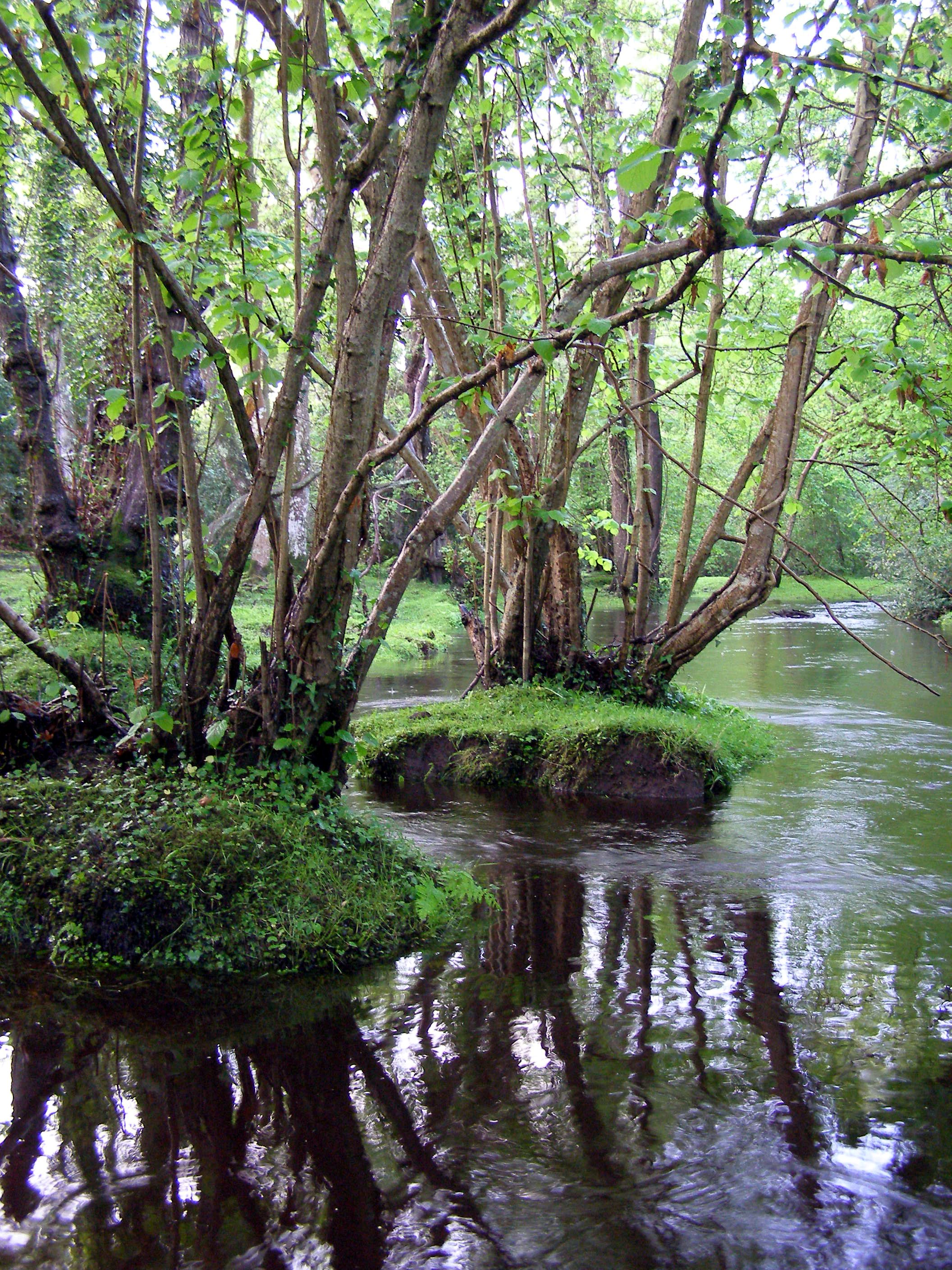
Alder trees in the river north of Fawley Ford

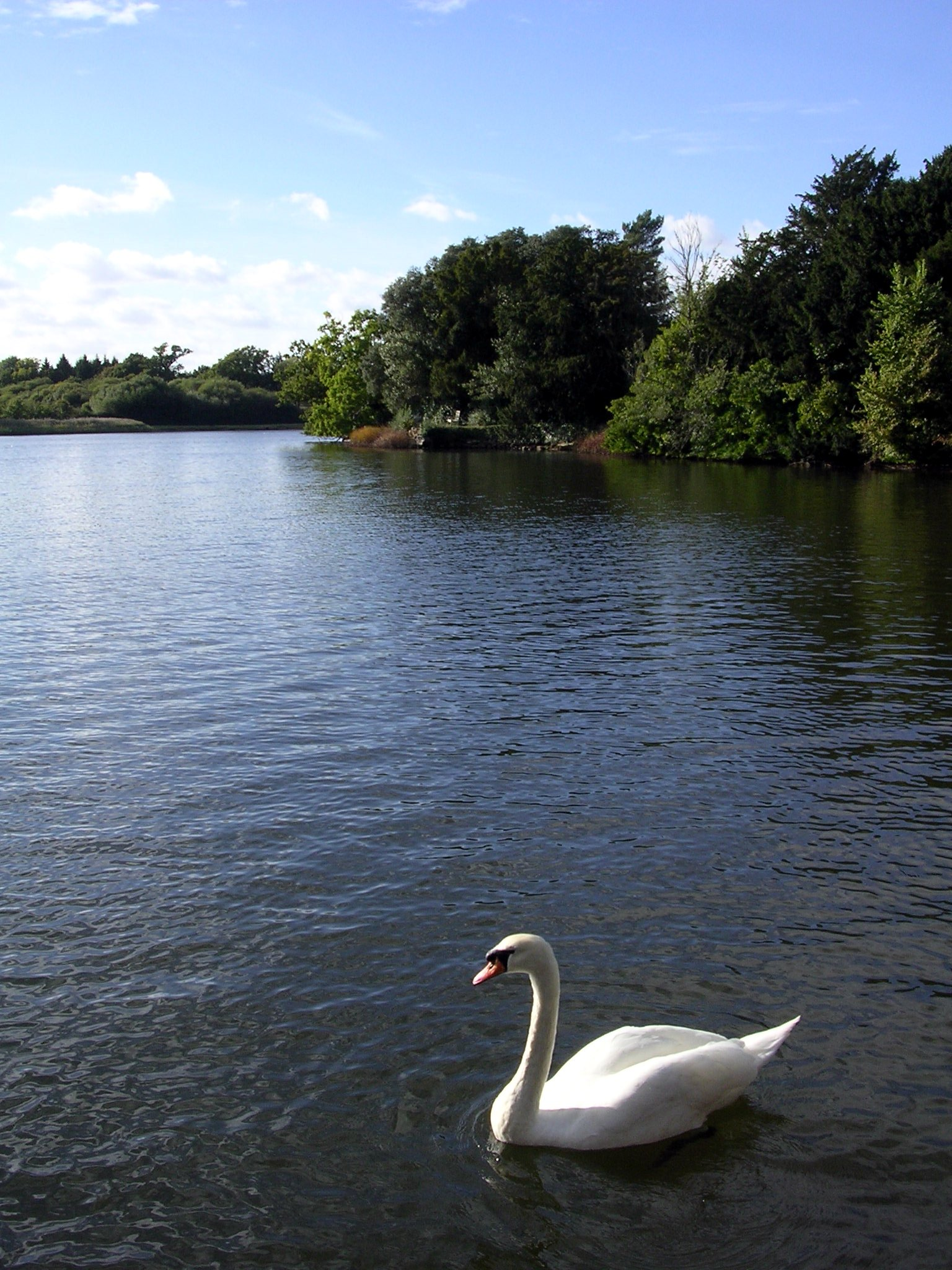
The Mill Dam at Beaulieu

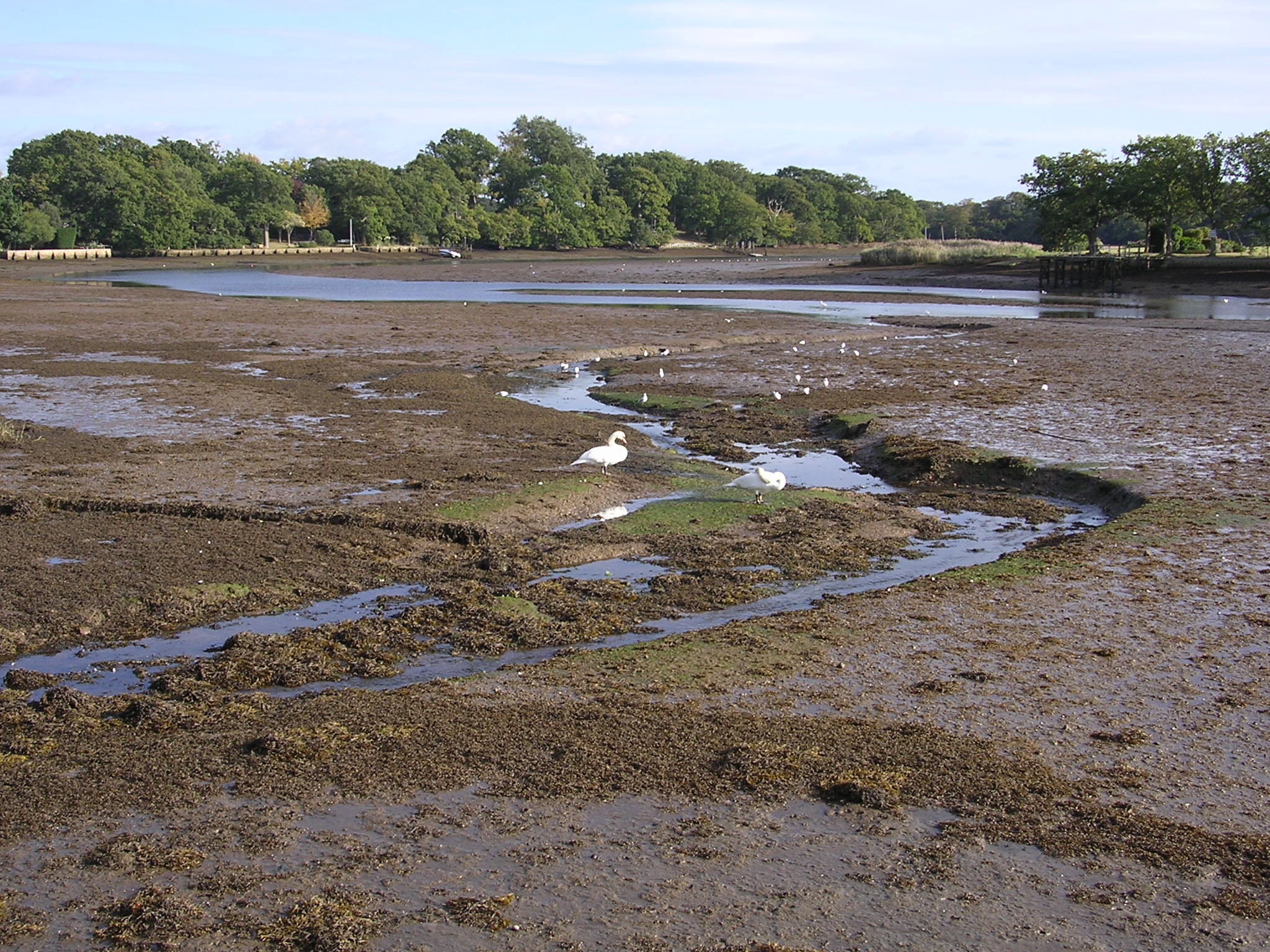
The upper tidal limit of the river

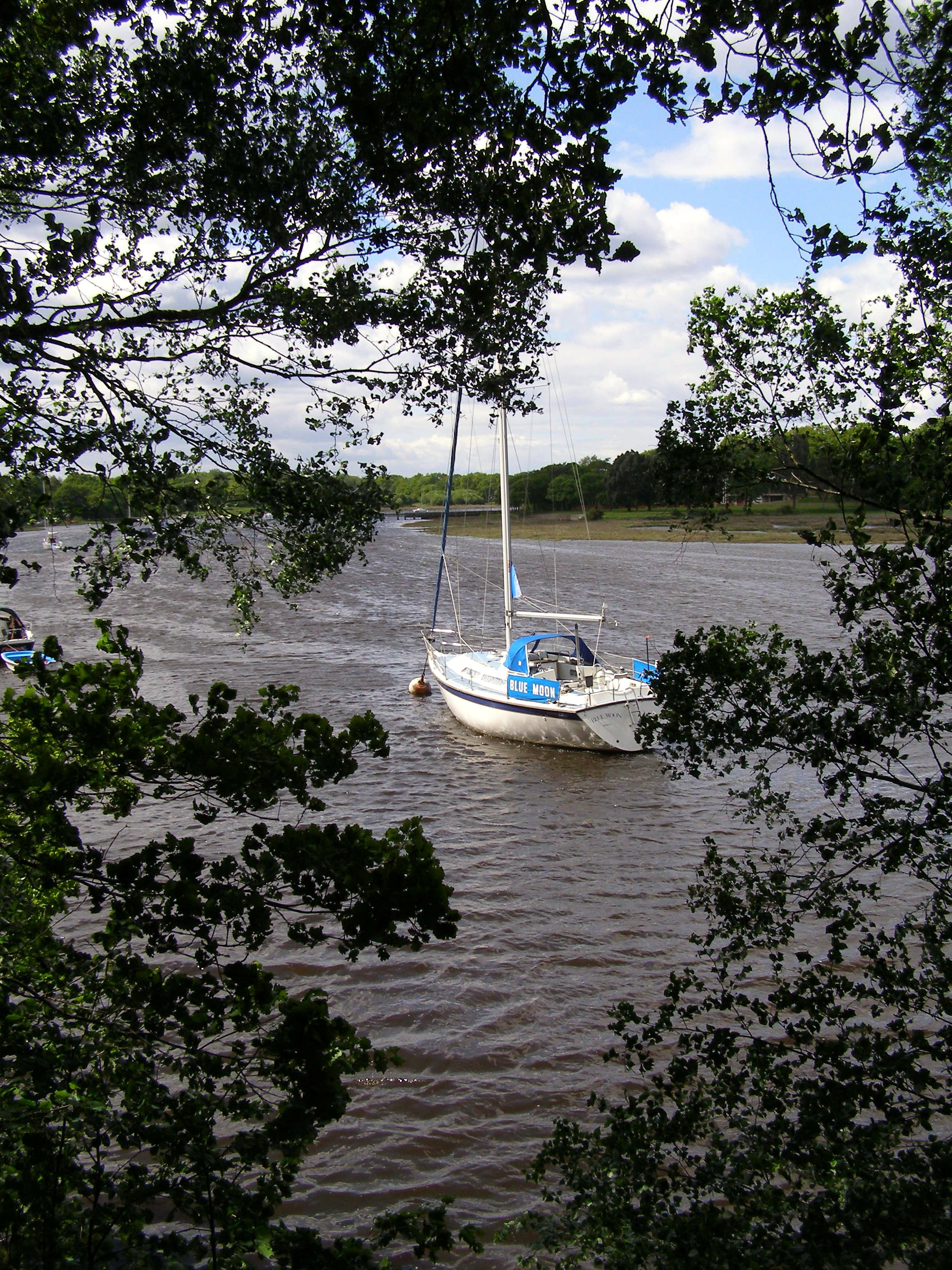
The river between Beaulieu and Bucklers Hard

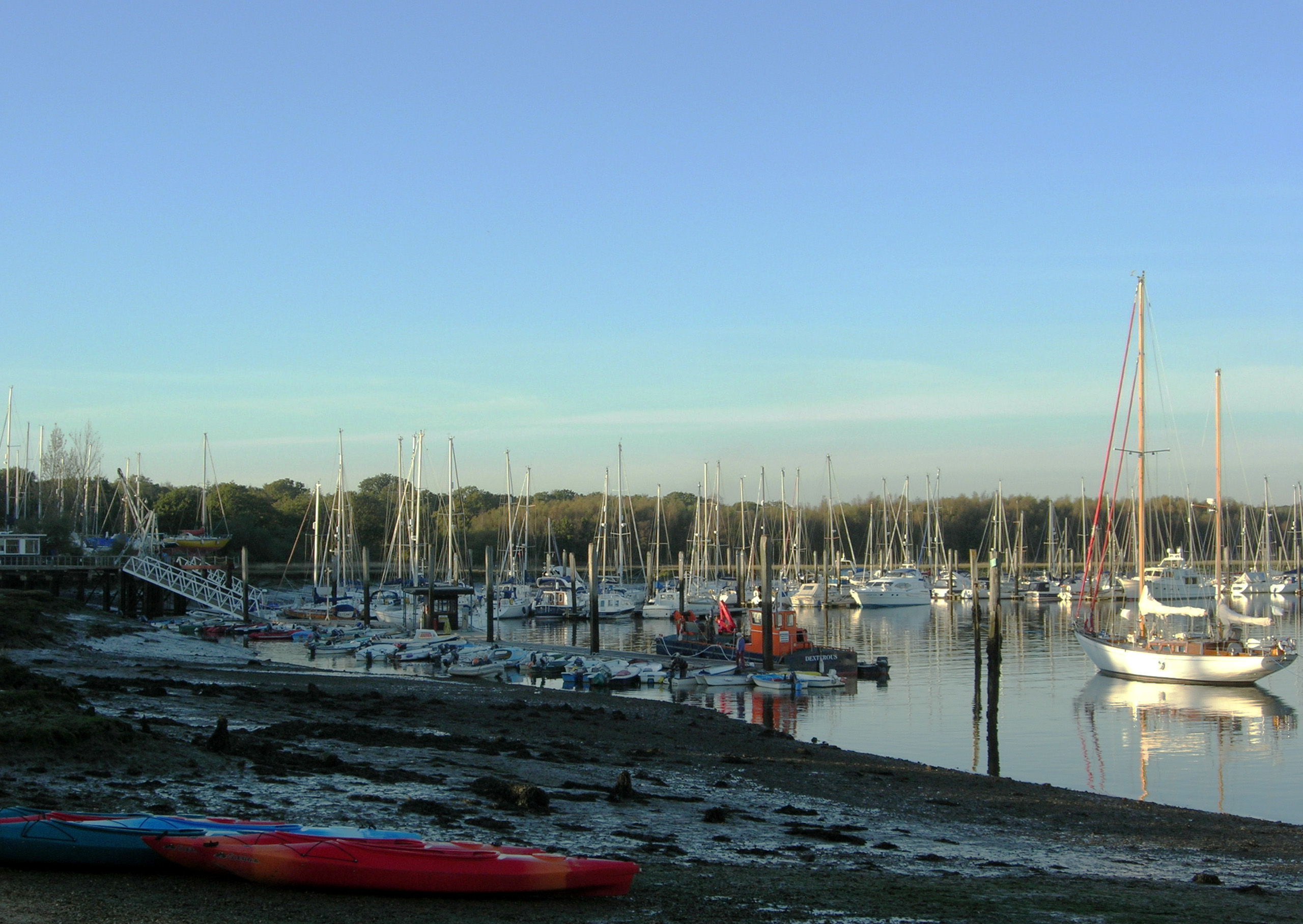
The river at Bucklers Hard

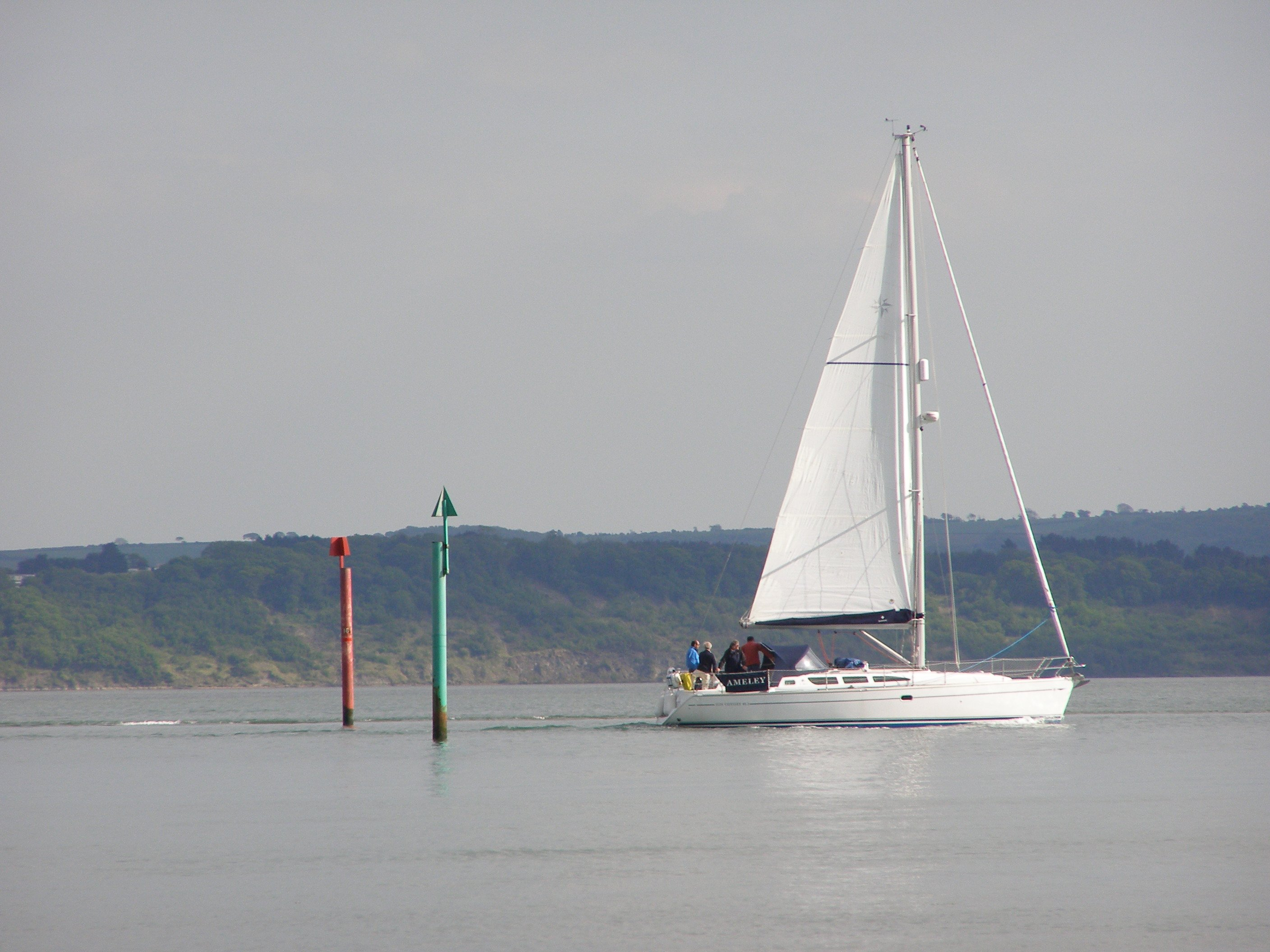
A yacht entering the river from the Solent

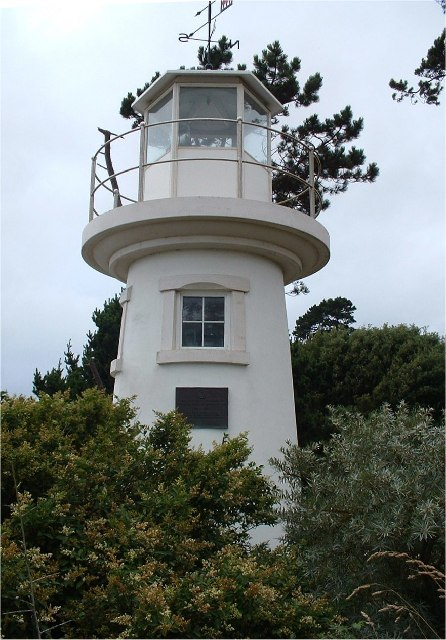
Millennium Lighthouse at the mouth of the river
