= Crafton =

Crafton may refer to:

== Places ==
- Crafton, Buckinghamshire, England
- Crafton, Pennsylvania, United States
- Crafton, California, United States
- Crafton, Virginia, United States

== Other uses ==
- Crafton (name)
