= Mentmore and Crafton Studs =

Horse breeding operations in England

Coordinates: 51.868°N 0.691°W

J E Boehm's statue of King Tom, the Founding stallion, shown here marking the horse's grave at Mentmore. The statue was moved to Dalmeny in 1977.

Mentmore Stud and Crafton Stud were Thoroughbred horse breeding operations that were part of the Mentmore Towers estate on the Bedfordshire and Buckinghamshire borders, England.

The Crafton stud farm is located at Crafton, Buckinghamshire, approximately one mile from Mentmore Towers and was founded circa 1850 by Baron Mayer de Rothschild. The most notable horses from this era included Rothschild's founding stallion King Tom and his offspring Favonius and Hannah who between them won the Epsom Derby, 1,000 Guineas, Oaks, and St Leger in 1871.

Mentmore Stud was built between 1913 and 1914 by Archibald Primrose, 5th Earl of Rosebery to complement his nearby stud farm at Crafton which he had acquired through his 1878 marriage to Baron Mayer de Rothschild's daughter Hannah. The first two stallions to stand at Mentmore were Cicero and Neil Gow. The 5th Earl won The Derby three times with Crafton-bred horses at Ladas, Sir Visto, and Cicero.

In 1929 both Crafton and Mentmore studs were inherited by Harry Primrose, 6th Earl of Rosebery who subsequently bred numerous winners; two of the most notable stallions bred at Mentmore were Epsom Derby winners Blue Peter (1939) and Ocean Swell (1944).
