= Thistle Brook =

River in Buckinghamshire, England

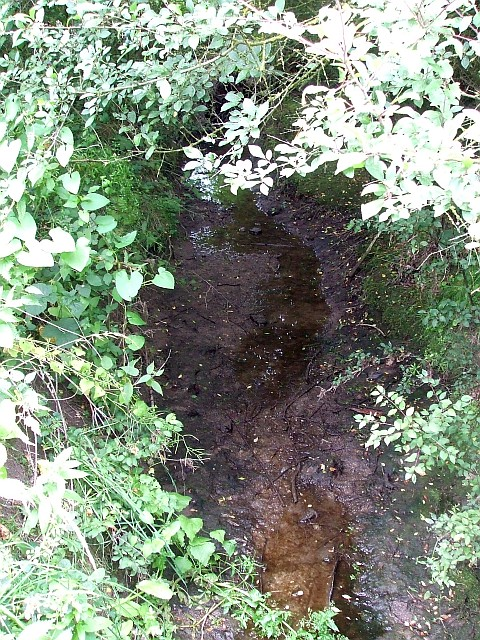
- The river near Wingrave

Location
- Country: United Kingdom
- County: Buckinghamshire

Physical characteristics
- Source
  - location: Mentmore, Aylesbury Vale
  - coordinates: 51°51′39″N 0°42′18″W
- Mouth
  - location: River Thame, Aylesbury Vale
  - coordinates: 51°50′33″N 0°44′11″W

Thistle Brook is a short, minor river (brook) in Buckinghamshire, England that is a tributary to the River Thame.

Located entirely in the Aylesbury Vale district, the brook rises in a farm (historically Thistlebrook farm) in the civil parish of Mentmore, west of the village of Mentmore and south of Crafton, and flows south-west past Wingrave (located towards the north) and through a culvert under a road in the neighbourhood of Thistlebrook, before flowing into the River Thame.
