= Synagogue of Naples =

Synagogue in Naples

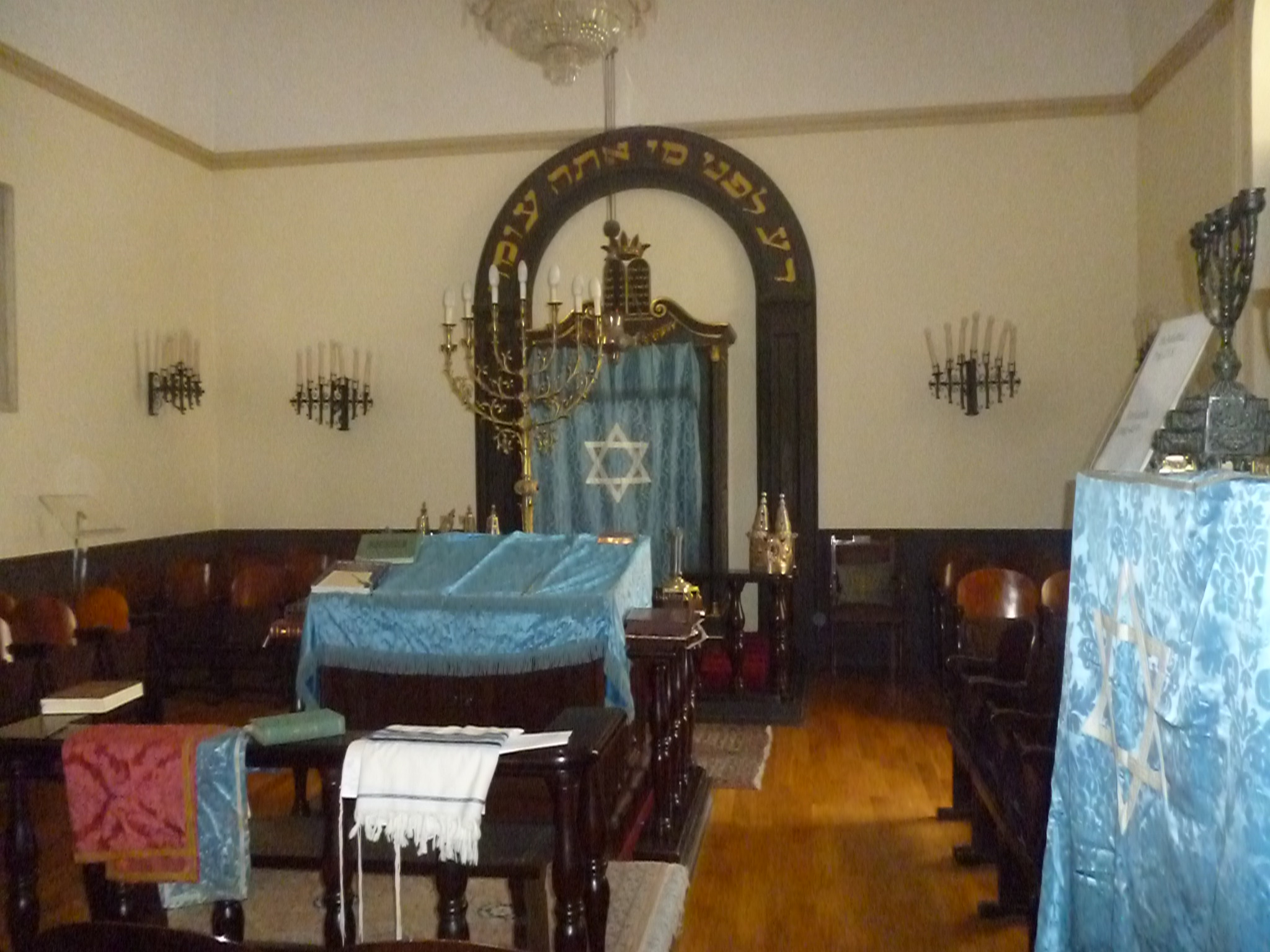
- Interior of the synagogue

Religion
- Affiliation: Judaism
- Rite: Spanish rite

Location
- Location: Via Cappella Vecchia 31, Naples, Italy
- Interactive map of Synagogue of Naples
- Coordinates: 40°49′59″N 14°14′37″E

Architecture
- Founder: Adolph Carl von Rothschild
- Completed: 1864

The Synagogue of Naples is an Orthodox Jewish synagogue located on Via Cappella Vecchia 31 in the Palazzo Sessa in Naples, Italy.

== History ==
Historically, the Jews of Naples lived in the quarter of Giudecca di San Marcellino, and had a previous synagogue established in 1153. It was destroyed following the expulsion of Jews from the Kingdom of Naples by the House of Bourbon. Following Italian reunification, Jews returned to the city and established the current synagogue through Samuel Solomon Weil and Adolph Carl von Rothschild. The congregation was founded in 1861, and the building was originally rented. It was purchased in full in 1927. Renovations were made in the early 1930s, and the synagogue was closed in 1943 due to persecution during WWII.

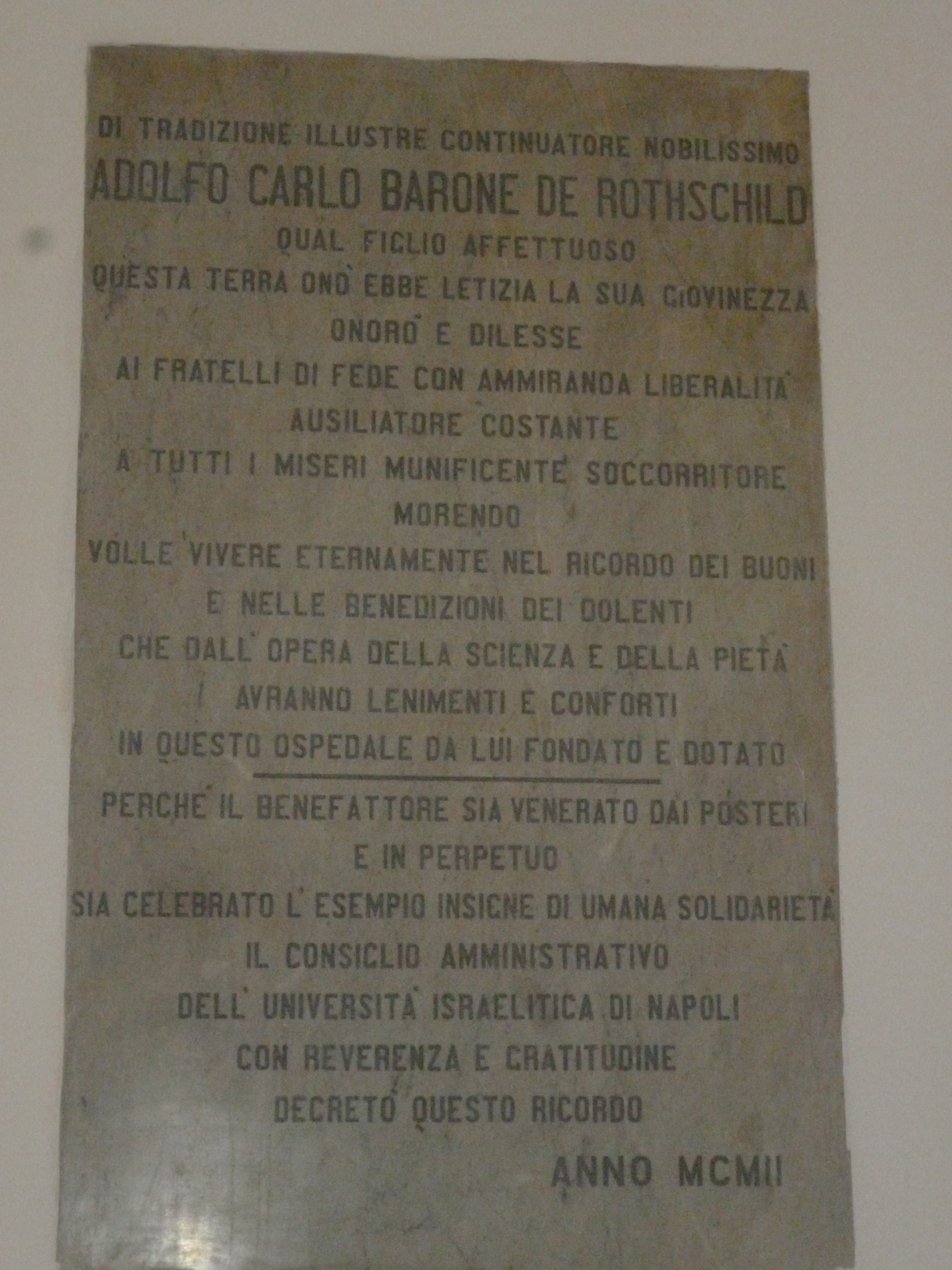
Plaque commemorating Baron de Rothschild

The conference hall was closed due to restoration work, and reopened in 1992 following funding for completion by the Italian Ministry of Culture. In October 2006, the building was vandalized with four swastikas, along with wording praising Adolf Hitler. The synagogue was visited by German President Frank-Walter Steinmeier in September 2019 to meet with the city's Jewish community.

== Description ==
The synagogue consists of two rectangular sections separated by an arch. The women's section of the shul is located above. The entrance has two marble statues. One commemorates Dario Ascarelli, who was the leader of the Jewish community who bought the buildings for the synagogue, and another one memorializes the deportation of Neapolitan Jews during the Holocaust.

The shul is on the first floor of the building, and oversees a courtyard. The bema is surrounding by Pews and faces across from the Torah ark on the eastern wall. The complex also contains meeting rooms, offices, and residence of the rabbi.

== See also ==
- List of synagogues in Italy
- History of the Jews in Naples
