= Adolph Carl von Rothschild =

Banker and philanthropist (1823–1900)

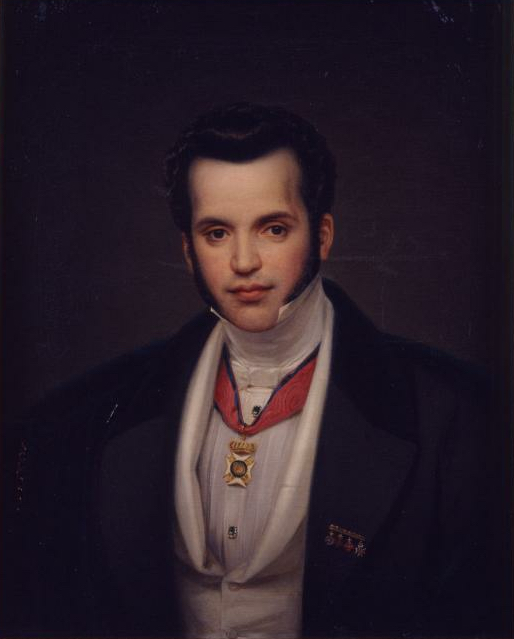
Adolph Carl von Rothschild in 1851 by Moritz-Daniel Oppenheim.

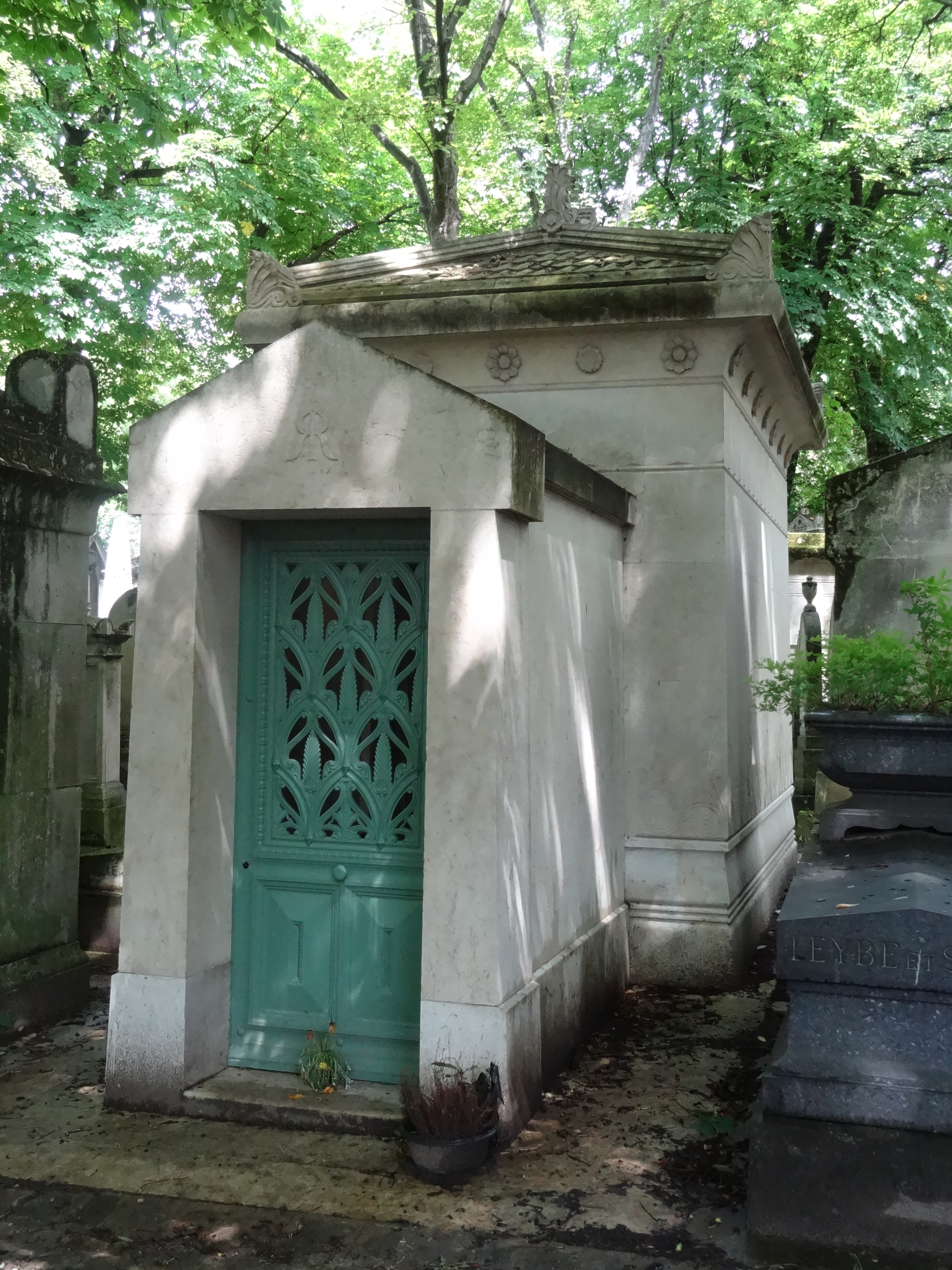
His tomb.

Baron Adolph Carl von Rothschild (21 May 1823 – 7 February 1900) was a banker. He is buried in division 7 of the Père Lachaise Cemetery in Paris.

== Life ==
He was born in Frankfurt, the third son of Carl Mayer von Rothschild, and in 1850 he married baroness Julie Caroline von Rothschild (1830–1907) - the marriage remained childless. Considered less gifted than his elder brother Mayer Carl, who headed the branch of the family bank in Vienna, he was ejected from the Frankfurt branch in 1856 to head that in Naples, where he also acted as consul general for the Duchy of Parma and began to collect art.

In 1858 he had George Henry Stokes and Joseph Paxton design and build the château de Pregny for him in the Louis XVI style on an estate overlooking Lake Léman. It was mainly intended to house his collection of paintings and artworks, notably rock crystal items (he had acquired the Grand Duke of Baden's collection of them) and works in semi-precious stones. He extended the château's garden and built an aviary and greenhouses which now form part of the Geneva Botanical Gardens.

When Naples was invaded by Garibaldi's troops in 1860 he fled north to Gaeta with Francis II of the Two Sicilies, but could not obtain permission from his family to loan the deposed king money. Adolph sold his residence in Naples and retired from business life in 1863, though the following year he began construction on Naples' present-day synagogue in the Chiaia district. He moved to Paris in 1868, specifically a hôtel particulier at 45-47 rue de Monceau originally built for Isaac Pereire. It was rebuilt for Adolph by Félix Langlais.

After a Genevan surgeon successfully removed a piece of metal from Adolph's eye in 1886, the baron decided to set up a hospital for "the treatment of eye and head illnesses and open to the specialities and techniques imposed by the progress of Medicine". He died before that project could be completed and it was brought to fruition by his widow, opening in Paris in 1905 as the Hôpital Fondation Adolphe de Rothschild. On his death in Frankfurt he left his château, hôtel and art collection to his niece Adelheid's son Maurice.

== Bibliography ==
- (in French) Bertrand Gille, Histoire de la Maison Rothschild, Librairie Droz, Genève, 1965 & 1967. 2 volumes
