= History of the Jews in Naples =

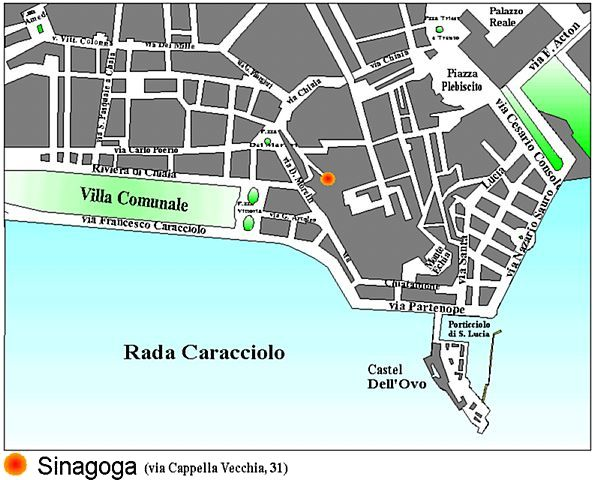
Location of the synagogue in Naples

The history of the Jews in Naples deals with the presence of Jews in the city of Naples, Italy. The Jewish presence in the city goes back at least 2,000 years. Today, the Jewish community in Naples numbers around 200 people.

== History ==
Records of the first Jews in Naples go back to around the 1st century under the Romans. By 536, the Jewish community of Naples was sufficiently sizeable and economically established to fight with the then-resident Goths against the Byzantines. In 1159, when Benjamin of Tudela visited the city, he noted that 500 Jewish families lived in the city. In 1288, after Dominican priests spread anti-Jewish sentiments, the Kingdom of Naples issued an expulsion order for the Jews and in 1293 any Jews still in Naples were forced to convert.

In 1473, the first Jewish press was established in Naples. In 1492, many Jews who were expelled from Spain came to Naples, where King Ferdinand protected them. However, in 1495, the French conquered the kingdom and persecuted its Jews. In 1510, Spain won control of the city and expelled the Jews, but those who paid 300 ducanti were permitted to stay. In 1535, the price was raised forcing many Jews to leave and by 1541 all Jews of Naples had left.

In 1735, Jews were permitted to return to Naples. In 1831, a small group of Jews settled in the Maltese Cross Hotel where one of the rooms served as a synagogue. In 1841, the Rothschild family, which had set up an office in Naples, acquired the Villa Pignatelli which, according to some accounts, served as the Jewish centre. In 1864, the community rented space in Via Cappella Vecchia, which became the community centre. In 1863, the Rothschild Naples office closed and in 1867 the Villa Pignatelli was sold.

Naples's Jewish community in the 1920s comprised almost 1,000 members. Between 1942 and 1943, 50 Jews of Naples were saved from German deportation by being hidden by villagers in the area of Caserta. Many Jews were taken to extermination camps from Naples and others were killed elsewhere. After World War II, the Jewish community of Naples was made up of only a handful that had survived. Today, the city's Jewish population numbers about 200.

== Synagogue ==
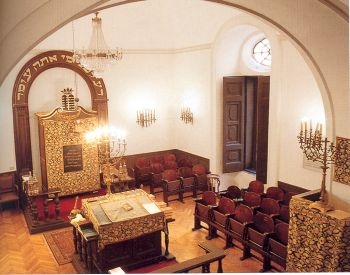
Synagogue interior

The synagogue in Naples is located on Via Cappella Vecchia. The building, located in the Palazzo Sessa, was inaugurated in 1864 thanks to the influence of Baron Rothschild. In the entrance there are two marble statues: one which remembers the community president Dario Ascarelli who bought the premises for the synagogue in 1910 and another which commemorates the deportation of Neapolitan Jews during the Second World War. The large conference room has been reopened after restoration work that was carried out in 1992.

== See also ==
=== History of the Jews in Italy by region ===
- History of the Jews in Apulia
- History of the Jews in Calabria
- History of the Jews in Livorno
- History of the Jews in Sicily
- History of the Jews in Trieste
- History of the Jews in Turin
- History of the Jews in Venice

=== Other ===
- History of the Jews in the Roman Empire
- Rothschild banking family of Naples
