= Mentmore Towers =

English country house in Buckinghamshire

Coordinates: 51.8682°N 0.6906°W

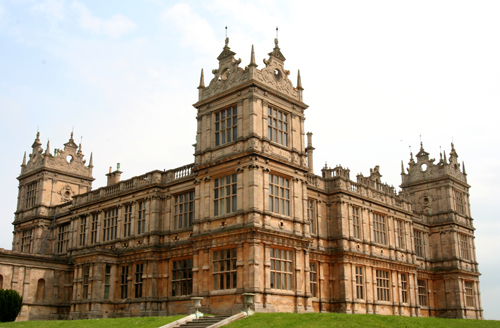
Mentmore Towers

Mentmore Towers, historically known simply as "Mentmore", is a 19th-century English country house built between 1852 and 1854 for the Rothschild family in the village of Mentmore in Buckinghamshire. Sir Joseph Paxton and his son-in-law, George Henry Stokes, designed the building in the 19th-century revival of late 16th and early 17th-century Elizabethan and Jacobean styles called Jacobethan. The house was designed for the banker and collector of fine art Baron Mayer de Rothschild as a country home, and as a display case for his collection of fine art. The mansion has been described as one of the greatest houses of the Victorian era. Mentmore was inherited by Hannah Primrose, Countess of Rosebery, née Rothschild, and owned by her descendants, the Earls of Rosebery.

Mentmore was the first of what were to become virtual Rothschild estates in the Vale of Aylesbury. Baron Mayer de Rothschild began purchasing land in the area in 1846. Later, other members of the family built houses at Tring in Hertfordshire, Ascott, Aston Clinton, Waddesdon and Halton.

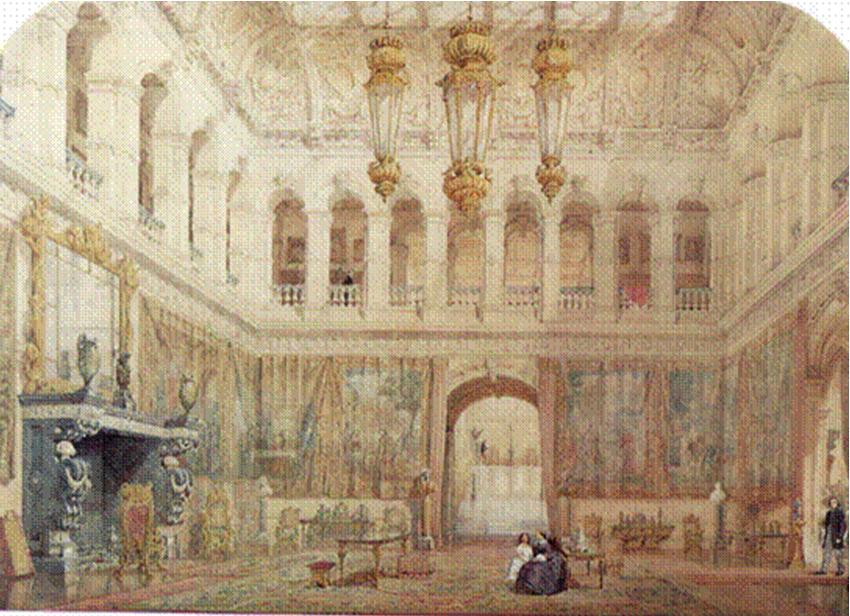
The Grand Hall at Mentmore. Aged just five months, Hannah de Rothschild helped lay the foundation stone for the great mansion on 31 December 1851. She is pictured here in white with her mother circa 1863.

Much of the estate was sold in 1944, but the mansion, its grounds, formal gardens, several farms and the majority of the village of Mentmore remained in the ownership of Harry Primrose, 6th Earl of Rosebery, until his death in 1974. The Earl's executors explored the possibility of Mentmore Towers along with its contents being preserved intact as a heritage property and opened to the public, as has been the case with some other National Trust properties (including Waddesdon). Despite prolonged discussions between the Executors and Government representatives over the following three years, no agreement to save the house for the nation was reached. Thus, in 1977, the contents of the house were sold at public auction by Sotheby's. The following year the empty mansion with its formal gardens and 80 acres were sold to the Maharishi Foundation who occupied it for the next two decades. In 1999, it was again sold, to investor Simon Halabi, who planned to build additional hotel and conference facilities; the plan did not proceed and the property was allowed to deteriorate. In 1992 the Mentmore Golf and Country Club opened, on land previously owned by the estate; it closed in 2015. The house is currently uninhabited.

Mentmore Towers is a Grade I listed building, with its park and gardens listed Grade II*.

== Architecture ==
Baron Rothschild commissioned Sir Joseph Paxton, who was then designing and supervising construction of the much-admired Crystal Palace, to design Mentmore. Paxton was responsible for the ridge and furrow glass roof which covered the central hall, designed to imitate the arcaded courtyard of a Renaissance palazzo, while Stokes was co-architect and clerk of works. The builder was the London firm George Myers, frequently employed by members of the Rothschild family.

In keeping with the contents intended to be displayed within, the interiors take their inspiration principally from the Italian Renaissance, although the house also contains drawing rooms and cabinets decorated in the gilded styles of late 18th-century France. The external design is closely based on that of Robert Smythson's Wollaton Hall.

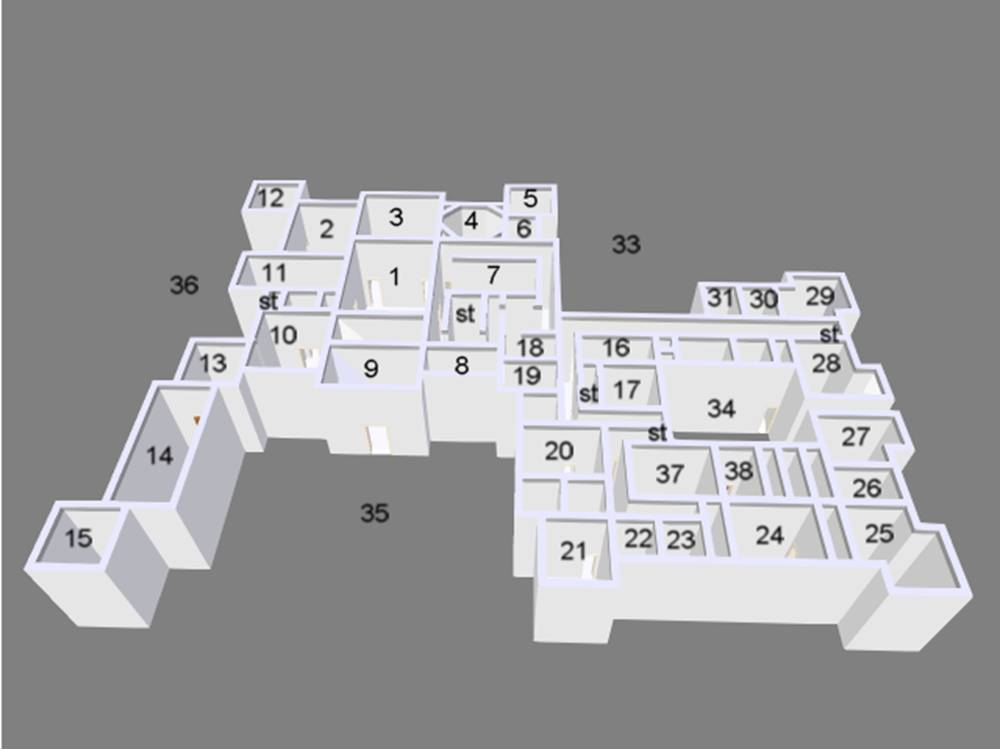
Mentmore, the ground floor; many of the rooms named for the collections they once contained. 1:Grand Hall; 2:White Drawing Room; 3:Dining Room; 4:Library; 5:Amber Room; 6:limoges Room; 7:Imperial staircase; 8:Study; 9:Vestibule; 10:Green drawing Room; 11:South Entrance Hall; 12:Blarenberghe Room; 13:du Barry Room; 14:Billiards Room; 15:Smoking Room/Armoury; 33: Italian garden; 34:Servants' courtyard; 35:Cour d'honneur; 36:South Terrace; ST:minor service staircases. For other rooms, please see Servants' quarters

The dining room (3). The boiseries, or elaborately carved wood panels, were from the Hôtel de Villars, Paris, and are the first example of this type of decoration to be used in an English house. The fragments of the boiseries not used at Mentmore were later installed at Waddesdon Manor

== Earls of Rosebery ==
Mayer de Rothschild and his wife used the house for over twenty years before their deaths, his in 1874 and the Baroness's some eighteen months later. The house and estate were then inherited by their daughter Hannah, later Countess of Rosebery. Following her death from Bright's disease in 1890 at age 39, the house became the home of her widower Archibald Philip Primrose, 5th Earl of Rosebery, later Prime Minister for two years from 1894. In 1922, the fifth earl gave the estate to his son Harry Meyer Archibald Primrose, Lord Dalmeny, who in 1929, on the death of his father, became the sixth Earl.

Both earls bred numerous winners of classic horse races at the two stud farms on the estate, including five Epsom Derby winners. These were Ladas, Sir Visto, and Cicero from the Crafton Stud; plus Ocean Swell and Blue Peter from the Mentmore stud. Both stud farms were within a kilometre of the mansion and together with the stable yard were designed by the architect George Devey, who also designed many cottages in the estate's villages of Mentmore, Crafton and Ledburn.

=== Second World War ===
The second wife of the sixth Earl, Eva Primrose, Countess of Rosebery, was interested in the arts and was acquainted with Kenneth Clark and other national art museum directors. As a result of Lady Rosebery's friendships, Mentmore was chosen by the British government to store part of the British national art collections during the Second World War. The collections of the National Portrait Gallery were subsequently stored at Mentmore for the duration of the war, along with pieces from the Royal Collection, including the Gold State Coach. Further works transferred to Mentmore included the portraits from Speaker's House in the Palace of Westminster, and tapestries, furniture and Grinling Gibbons carvings from Hampton Court Palace.

The royal coach was stored in the "battery room" subsequently nicknamed the "refuge", part of the "gas house", a group of outbuildings where gas and electricity had once been produced for the estate. Four men guarded the refuge at night, and two during the day.

=== Sale and dispersal ===
Cover of "SAVE Mentmore for the Nation". This booklet was published by SAVE Britain's Heritage in February 1977

The possible purchase of Mentmore for the nation through the government's National Land Fund was the desire of Roy Strong, the director of the V&A, who hoped that Mentmore would become a "branch" of his museum devoted to 19th-century decorative arts as Ham House was for the 17th century and Osterley was for the 18th century. The government refused to spend such large sums from the fund, and the sale fell through.

Following the death of the sixth earl in 1974, the Labour government of James Callaghan refused to accept the contents in lieu of inheritance taxes, which could have turned the house into one of England's finest museums of European furniture, objets d'art and Victorian era architecture. The government was offered the house and contents for UK£2 million (equivalent to £21,746,427 in 2025), but the offer was declined by the Department for the Environment. The department cited the high cost of maintaining Mentmore, which it estimated could rise above £80,000 per year. The possibility of sourcing the money from the National Land Fund was also explored, but the government was only willing to commit a portion of the necessary funding from the NLF, insisting that the rest should come by private means, which were "not forthcoming".

After three more years of fruitless discussion, the executors of the estate sold the contents by public auction, and the large collection was dispersed. The estate made over £6,000,000 (equivalent to £35,251,779 in 2025), but a tiny fraction of its estimated worth today. Among the paintings sold were works by Gainsborough, Reynolds, Boucher, Drouais, Moroni and other well known artists, and cabinet makers, including Jean Henri Riesener and Chippendale. Also represented were the finest German and Russian silver- and goldsmiths, and makers of Limoges enamel. This Rothschild/Mentmore collection is said to have been one of the finest ever to be assembled in private hands, other than the collections of the Russian and British royal families. The house itself was purchased by the Maharishi International College in December 1978 for £240,000. The sale of Mentmore has been described as a "turning point for the preservation movement".

Several family portraits, sculptures and furnishing were relocated from Mentmore prior to the sale by the Roseberys to their ancestral Scottish home, Dalmeny House, near Edinburgh. Items from Mentmore at Dalmeny include tapestries, Sèvres porcelain, and an equestrian statue by Joseph Boehm of "King Tom", the foundation stallion for Baron Mayer de Rothschild's Mentmore and Crafton Studs.

== Maharishi Foundation ==
Mentmore became the headquarters for Maharishi Mahesh Yogi's educational charity, the Maharishi Foundation, in 1978. As of 1997 the Natural Law Party also rented rooms there. The building was put up for sale in 1997 but did not change owners until 1999 when it was purchased by investor Simon Halabi.

== Simon Halabi ==
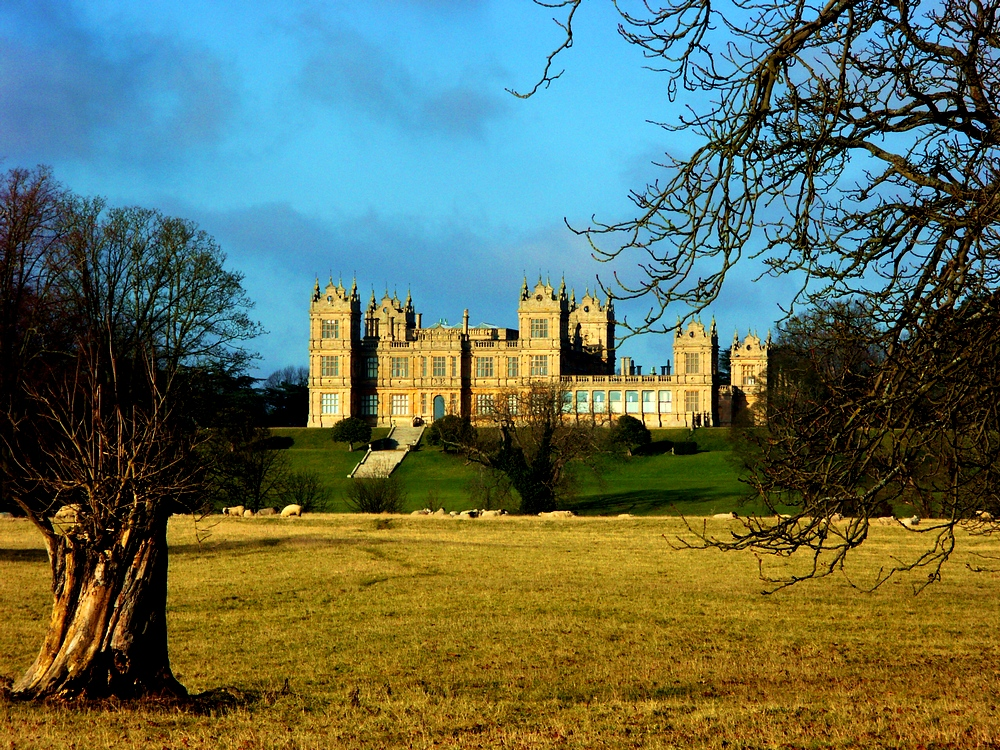
Rear of the house

Under the ownership of Halabi, the property was renamed Mentmore Towers Ltd, with the intention of converting it into a luxury hotel with 171 suites, including 122 in a new wing on the slope below the house. However, in September 2004, Jonathan Davey, a local resident, won a last-minute injunction in the High Court to halt work on the hotel while a judicial review investigated whether the planning permission granted had followed the correct procedures. In March 2005, the High Court ruled that Aylesbury Vale District Council's decision to grant planning permission to the developers was "unimpeachable" and legally sound.

Halabi's property company, Buckingham Securities Holdings, was also proposing to develop the In & Out Club at 79–81 Piccadilly, London, also known as Cambridge House and once occupied by Lord Palmerston before it became the Naval and Military Club. The intention was to turn both properties into Europe's first six-star hotels, one located in town and the other to be the sister Country Manor hotel with a 36-hole private golf club. The original architects, EPR, were replaced by AFR in 2005, but the development stalled in 2007. In 2004, Hotel Design Inc were retained as interior designers for both projects, leading to a 2005 launch event for the marketing of the properties as a private members' club with hotel facilities (the PM Club).

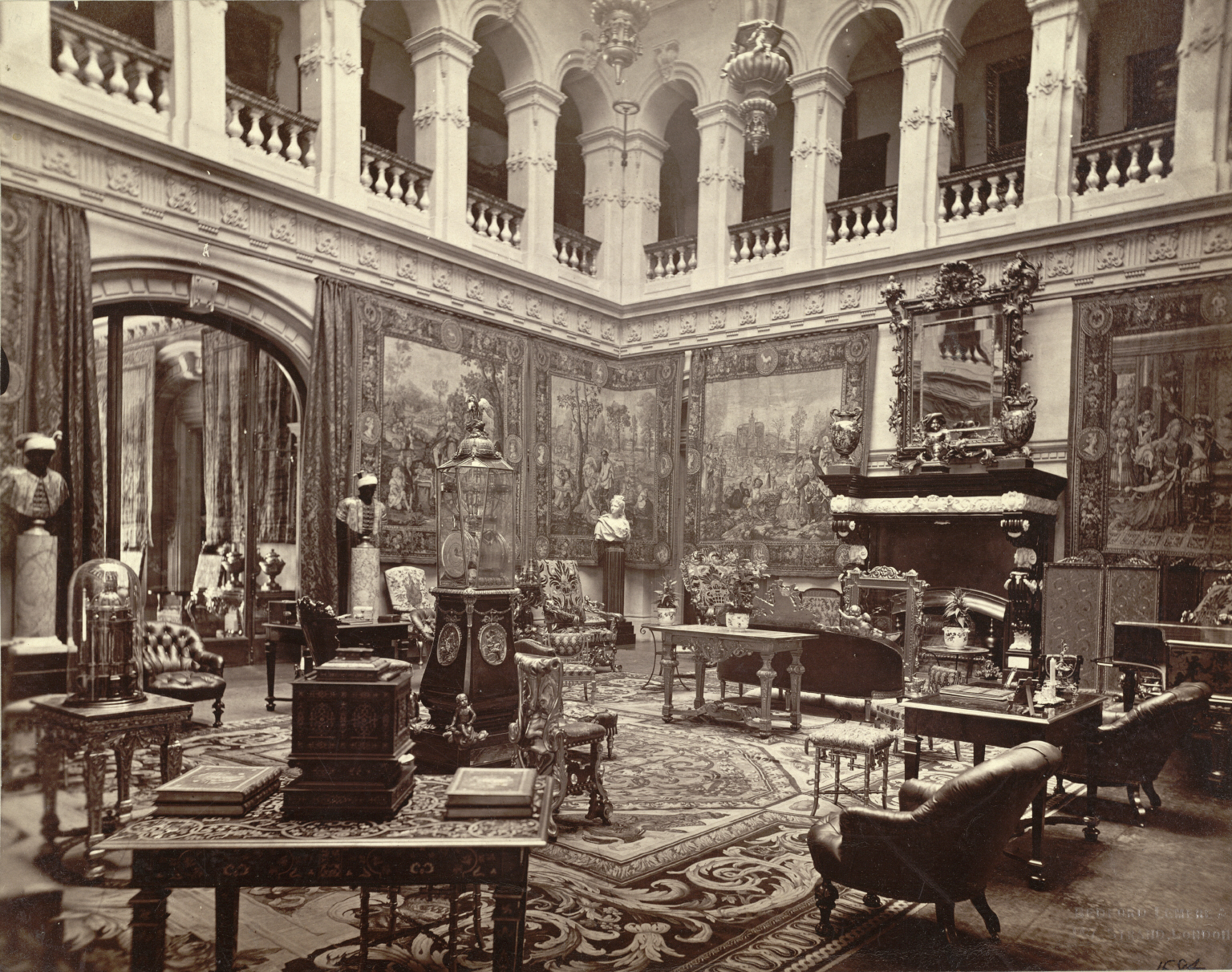
The Great Hall, circa 1880s

The last proposal, after the sister Piccadilly property was sold to the Rueben Brothers in 2009, was to renovate the original Mentmore Towers building and not construct the new extension containing guest-room suites, conference facilities and a large spa. However, with Halabi's property empire in serious trouble due to the housing market's collapse, the project stalled, and the property was in decline. By April 2022, a report described it as "abandoned" and "left to rot".

=== "At risk" condition ===
The house needs urgent work on the roof and chimneys. There is concern that weather will penetrate to the interiors, considered among the finest examples of Victorian design and craftsmanship in Britain. Historic England has placed Mentmore Towers on the Heritage at Risk Register, listing it in "poor" condition with "immediate risk of further rapid deterioration or loss of fabric", explaining that "the service wing roof is in very poor condition and the deterioration of the main house is accelerating with areas of water ingress into the main hall and adjacent reception rooms". By 2022, the need for restoration was classified as priority A (up from priority B in 2016–2021). The report states "immediate risk of further rapid deterioration or loss of fabric: no solution agreed' in spite of a restoration plan that had been previously completed".

On 3 May 2024, Thames Valley Police posted on their Facebook page that they had responded the previous night to a report of two people breaking into Mentmore Towers, which had become a regular occurrence. Officers had been curbing this and responding swiftly to apprehend those involved.

== Golf courses ==
Much of the historic estate was sold off in 1944 and reverted to agricultural use before becoming the Mentmore Golf and Country Club, established in 1992, which had two eighteen-hole golf courses designed by Bob Sandow, the Rothschild Course and the Rosebery Course. The club ceased trading in 2015.

== Film location ==
The house has appeared in many films, including: Brazil (1985), Slipstream (1989), Incognito (1997), Eyes Wide Shut (1999), Quills (2000), The Mummy Returns (2001), Ali G Indahouse (2002), Johnny English (2003), Batman Begins (2005), Infinite (2021), and Pressure (2026). Mentmore Park also featured as a location in the Inspector Morse episode "Cherubim and Seraphim".

In addition, it has been used as a location for music videos, including the Roxy Music video for "Avalon" (1982), "Magic Touch" by Mike Oldfield (1987), Enya's "Only If..." (1997), "Until the Time Is Through" by Five (1998), "What Is Love" by Haddaway (1993), and "Goodbye" by the Spice Girls (1998).

Most recently, for the 2026 film Pressure the exterior of Mentmore Towers was used to represent the headquarters of General Eisenhower in the days leading up to D-Day (6 June 1944).

== See also ==
- Rothschild banking family of England
- Château de Ferrières
- Fitzroy Robinson Ltd. v Mentmore Towers Ltd., a High Court case raising a claim of fraudulent misrepresentation
