= Ocean Swell =

British Thoroughbred racehorse

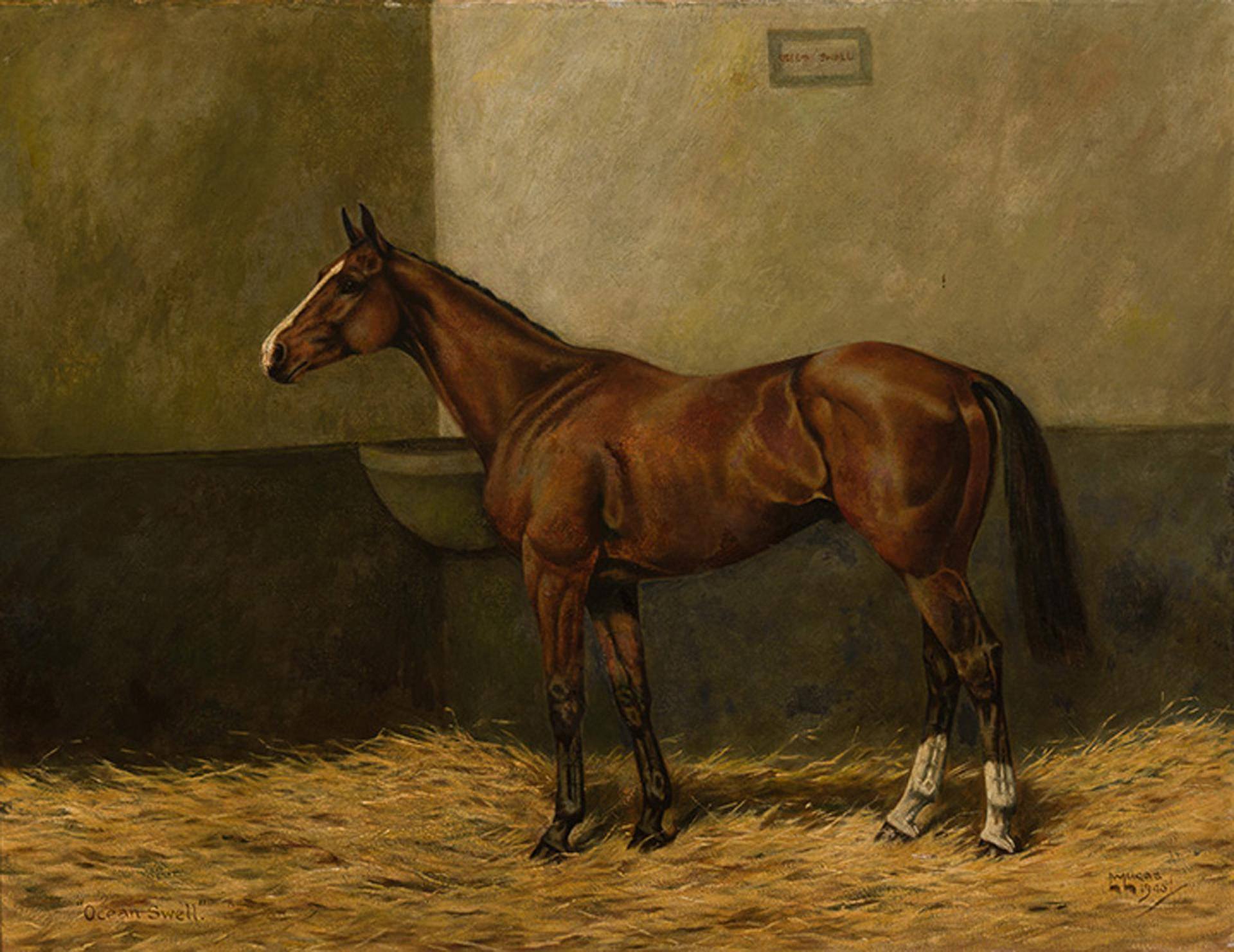
- by Henry Frederick Lucas Lucas, 1945
- Sire: Blue Peter
- Grandsire: Fairway
- Dam: Jiffy
- Damsire: Juniata
- Sex: Stallion
- Foaled: 1941
- Country: United Kingdom
- Colour: Bay
- Breeder: 6th Earl of Rosebery
- Owner: 6th Earl of Rosebery
- Trainer: Jack Jarvis
- Record: 15: 6-3-2
- Earnings: £9,905

Major wins
- New Derby (1944); Jockey Club Cup (1944); Ascot Gold Cup (1945)

Ocean Swell (1941–1954) was a British Thoroughbred racehorse and sire. In a career that lasted from 1943 to 1945 he ran fifteen times and won six races. As a three-year-old 1944 he won the New Derby, a wartime substitute for The Derby run at Newmarket. He later developed into a specialist stayer, winning the Jockey Club Cup in the autumn of 1944 and the Gold Cup at the following summer. He was then retired to stud where he had limited success.

== Background ==
Ocean Swell, like both of his parents, was bred by his owner, the Liberal politician and former First-class cricketer, Harry Primrose, 6th Earl of Rosebery, at his Mentmore Stud. He was a bay horse with a narrow white blaze and white socks on both his hind legs.

The colt was one of nine winners produced by the mare Jiffy, the best of the others being the 1946 Epsom Oaks runner-up Iona. Other descendants of Jiffy included the Kentucky Derby winners Tomy Lee and Genuine Risk. Ocean Swell was from the first crop of foals sired by Blue Peter, an outstanding racehorse who won the 2000 Guineas and the Derby in 1939 and went on to be champion sire on three occasions. Ocean Swell was sent into training with Jack Jarvis at his Park Lodge Stables at Newmarket, Suffolk.

== Racing career ==
=== 1943: two-year-old season ===
Ocean Swell showed little ability in the earliest part of his career, finishing unplaced in his first three starts, before running second in the Isleham Plate at Newmarket in the autumn. On his final run of the year Ocean Swell won the six furlong Alington Plate at the same course beating a field of nineteen which included the future New St Leger winner Tehran.

=== 1944: three-year-old season ===
Wartime led to many racecourses being closed either for safety reasons or because the land was needed for military use. Because of this all of Ocean Swell's races in 1944 took place at Newmarket. He began promisingly by winning the Column Produce Stakes over one mile and then finished third to the Fred Darling-trained Borealis in the Lavenham Handicap before running in the 2000 Guineas. He started at odds of 33/1 in a field of twenty-six and finished unplaced behind the filly Garden Path who beat Growing Confidence by a head, with Tehran third.

In the Derby, Jack Jarvis's stable jockey, Eph Smith, chose to ride Tehran and the ride on Ocean Swell went to William "Billy" Nevett, who was given leave from serving as a private in the Royal Army Ordnance Corps to take the mount. Nevett had already won one wartime Derby on Owen Tudor, a horse who had also been rejected by his stable's main jockey. Ocean Swell started a 28/1 outsider while Garden Path and Growing Confidence disputed favouritism in a field of twenty. The early pace was slow, but the field quickened just after half way and Nevett sent his horse into the lead just over three furlongs from the finish. In a "furious" finish, Ocean Swell stayed on strongly in the closing stages, showing "pluck and stamina" to win a "great fight" by a neck from Tehran, with the fast-finishing Happy Landing a short head back in third.

Ocean Swell did not race again for three months before contesting the New St Leger, in which he finished third behind Tehran and Borealis. On his final start of the year he was moved up to two and a quarter miles and showed his aptitude for extended distances by winning the Jockey Club Cup. After the race Lord Rosebery praised his colt's speed and stamina and announced that he would stay in training with the Ascot Gold Cup as his main objective.

=== 1945: four-year-old season ===
Like Ocean Swell, most of the top three-year-olds of 1944 stayed in training the following year, leading to speculation that the competition over middle and long distances would be particularly strong. Ocean Swell met Borealis on his first three starts as a four-year-old, all of which were at Newmarket. He won the April Stakes, but then finished second to the Darling-trained runner in the Wood Ditton Stakes. Ocean Swell next ran in a substitute Coronation Cup, in which he finished second to Borealis in a "great race", with the Oaks winner Hycilla in third. Tehran, who had been unbeaten since losing to Ocean Swell in the Derby was a late withdrawal: his trainer Frank Butters did not want to risk him on hard ground before the Ascot Gold Cup.

The end of the war in Europe meant than some races were allowed to return to their traditional venues and on 7 July the Gold Cup was run at Ascot for the first time since 1939 in front of an estimated 60,000 spectators. Ocean Swell was well suited by the two and a half mile course and won by a length and a half from Tehran. He was thus the first (and remains the only) Derby winner to win the Gold Cup at Ascot since Persimmon in 1897 (Owen Tudor had won a substitute "Gold Cup" at Newmarket over a reduced distance).

== Assessment ==
In their book A Century of Champions, John Randall and Tony Morris classified Ocean Swell as an "average" Derby winner, with a rating of 131.

== Stud career ==
Ocean Swell was a disappointment at stud. The only European runners of consequence he sired were the filly Sea Parrott (Yorkshire Oaks) and the successful handicapper Fastnet Rock. The best of his progeny was almost certainly the gelding St. Vincent, a minor winner in England who improved to become American Champion Male Turf Horse in 1955. Ocean Swell was put down after sustaining an injury in 1954.

== Pedigree ==
Pedigree of Ocean Swell (GB), bay stallion, 1941
Sire Blue Peter (GB) 1936	Fairway; 1925	Phalaris	Polymelus
Sire Blue Peter (GB) 1936	Fairway; 1925	Phalaris	Bromus
Sire Blue Peter (GB) 1936	Fairway; 1925	Scapa Flow	Chaucer
Sire Blue Peter (GB) 1936	Fairway; 1925	Scapa Flow	Anchora
Sire Blue Peter (GB) 1936	Fancy Free; 1924	Stefan The Great	The Tetrarch
Sire Blue Peter (GB) 1936	Fancy Free; 1924	Stefan The Great	Perfect Peach
Sire Blue Peter (GB) 1936	Fancy Free; 1924	Celiba	Bachelors Double
Sire Blue Peter (GB) 1936	Fancy Free; 1924	Celiba	Santa Maura
Dam Jiffy (GB) 1931	Hurry On; 1913	Marcovil	Marco
Dam Jiffy (GB) 1931	Hurry On; 1913	Marcovil	Lady Villikins
Dam Jiffy (GB) 1931	Hurry On; 1913	Tout Suite	Sainfoin
Dam Jiffy (GB) 1931	Hurry On; 1913	Tout Suite	Star
Dam Jiffy (GB) 1931	Juniata; 1916	Junior	Symington
Dam Jiffy (GB) 1931	Juniata; 1916	Junior	Scylla
Dam Jiffy (GB) 1931	Juniata; 1916	Samphire	Isinglass
Dam Jiffy (GB) 1931	Juniata; 1916	Samphire	Chelandry (Family: 1-n)
