= Blue Peter (British horse) =

British-bred Thoroughbred racehorse

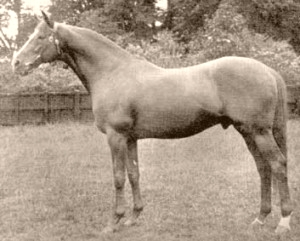
- Sire: Fairway
- Grandsire: Phalaris
- Dam: Fancy Free
- Damsire: Stefan the Great
- Sex: Stallion
- Foaled: 1936
- Country: Great Britain
- Colour: Bay
- Breeder: Mentmore Stud
- Owner: Harry Primrose, 6th Earl of Rosebery
- Trainer: Jack Jarvis
- Record: 6: 4-1-0
- Earnings: £31,964

Major wins
- Blue Riband Trial Stakes (1939); 2,000 Guineas (1939); Epsom Derby (1939); Eclipse Stakes (1939)

Awards
- Leading broodmare sire in Britain & Ireland (1954)

Honours
- LNER Peppercorn Class A2 60532 Blue Peter
- Last updated on 22 September 2010

Blue Peter (1936–1957) was a British bred Thoroughbred racehorse whose career was cut short by the outbreak of World War II. He won The Derby and was later a Leading broodmare sire in Great Britain & Ireland.

Bred and owned by Lord Rosebery, his sire was the good racehorse, Fairway and his dam Fancy Free was by Stefan the Great, a son of The Tetrarch.

Blue Peter was buried in the Mentmore estate.

== Racing record ==
At age two, Blue Peter raced twice without winning. He was unplaced in one outing and second in the Middle Park Stakes behind the top-rated British two-year-old, Foxbrough.

In 1939, three-year-old Blue Peter went undefeated in all four of his races. He captured the Blue Riband Trial Stakes, a prep race for the ensuing Triple Crown series. In May, the colt won the 2,000 Guineas and then June's Epsom Derby, defeating Heliopolis by four lengths. While Blue Peter was clearly the best three-year-old in Britain in 1939. The onset of World War II ended his chance to win the Triple Crown as the St. Leger Stakes was cancelled. Cancelled as well, was a planned match race against the brilliant French colt Pharis who had won the Prix du Jockey Club and France's most important race at the time, the Grand Prix de Paris.

== Stud record ==
Blue Peter was retired to stud duty at his owner's Mentmore Stud on the Mentmore Towers estate in Buckinghamshire. Successful, he was near the top on the British General Sires List three times and in 1954 was leading broodmare sire in Great Britain & Ireland.

His notable offspring included:

- Botticelli (ITY) was a winner of the 1954 Italian Derby and 1955 Ascot Gold Cup.
- First Consul (1946) - 1950 Ayr Gold Cup winner
- Masthead was a stakeswinner that was exported to Australia where he sired 10 stakeswinners for 21 stakeswins.
- Ocean Swell (b. h. 1941), winner of the 1944 Epsom Derby, Jockey Club Cup and 1945 Ascot Gold Cup.
- Peter Flower (1946) - multiple stakes race winner
- Unknown Quantity (1946) - filly who won the 1949 Yorkshire Oaks

Other successful Blue Peter sons that were exported into Australasia include Blueskin II, Blue Coral, Bold Buccaneer, Sabaean, Messmate and Wateringbury.

Blue Peter died in 1957 and is buried in the grounds of Mentmore Towers close to a statue of his ancestor King Tom.

Blue Peter was the horse his owner loved best, shortly after his death Lord Rosebery described him thus: "He was just like a human being although a placid animal. Blue Peter was particular about what he ate. Give him something he didn't like and he would take one look at it and turn away. He was the best horse I ever had and was the best I had ever seen and he had only half a career as a racehorse"

== Pedigree ==
Pedigree of Blue Peter (GB), b.h. 1936
Sire Fairway Bay 1925	Phalaris; Bay 1913	Polymelus	Cyllene
Sire Fairway Bay 1925	Phalaris; Bay 1913	Polymelus	Maid Marian
Sire Fairway Bay 1925	Phalaris; Bay 1913	Bromus	Sainfoin
Sire Fairway Bay 1925	Phalaris; Bay 1913	Bromus	Cheery
Sire Fairway Bay 1925	Scapa Flow; Chestnut 1914	Chaucer	St. Simon
Sire Fairway Bay 1925	Scapa Flow; Chestnut 1914	Chaucer	Canterbury Pilgrim
Sire Fairway Bay 1925	Scapa Flow; Chestnut 1914	Anchora	Love Wisely
Sire Fairway Bay 1925	Scapa Flow; Chestnut 1914	Anchora	Eryholme
Dam Fancy Free Bay 1924	Stefan the Great; Gr. 1916	The Tetrarch	Roi Herode
Dam Fancy Free Bay 1924	Stefan the Great; Gr. 1916	The Tetrarch	Vahren
Dam Fancy Free Bay 1924	Stefan the Great; Gr. 1916	Perfect Peach	Persimmon
Dam Fancy Free Bay 1924	Stefan the Great; Gr. 1916	Perfect Peach	Fascination
Dam Fancy Free Bay 1924	Celiba; Bay 1916	Bachelors Double	Tredennis
Dam Fancy Free Bay 1924	Celiba; Bay 1916	Bachelors Double	Lady Bawn
Dam Fancy Free Bay 1924	Celiba; Bay 1916	Santa Maura	St. Simon
Dam Fancy Free Bay 1924	Celiba; Bay 1916	Santa Maura	Palmflower (Family:20-c)
