= Mentmore =

Village in Buckinghamshire, England

Coordinates: 51.870°N 0.684°W

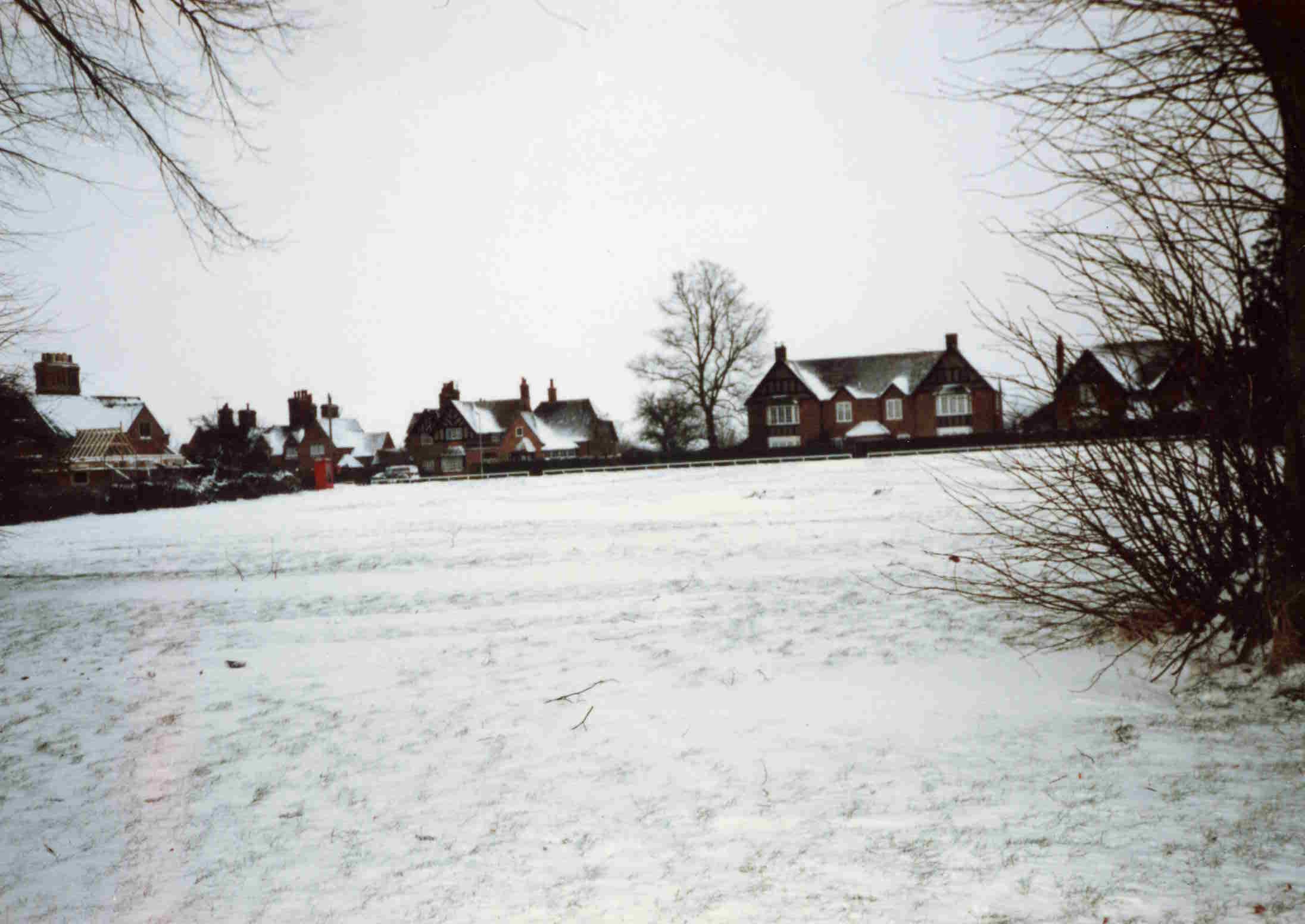
- Mentmore Village Green in winter 1963

- Location within Buckinghamshire
- Population: 385 (2011 Census)
- OS grid reference: SP9019
- Civil parish: Mentmore
- Unitary authority: Buckinghamshire
- Ceremonial county: Buckinghamshire
- Region: South East
- Country: England
- Sovereign state: United Kingdom
- Post town: Leighton Buzzard
- Postcode district: LU7
- Dialling code: 01296
- Police: Thames Valley
- Fire: Buckinghamshire
- Ambulance: South Central
- UK Parliament: Aylesbury
- Website: Mentmore Parish Council

Mentmore is a village and civil parish in the Aylesbury Vale district of Buckinghamshire, England. It is about three miles east of Wingrave, three miles south east of Wing.

The village toponym is derived from the Old English for "Menta's moor". The Domesday Book of 1086 records the village as Mentmore.

Queen Edith, the daughter of Earl Godwin and wife of King Edward the Confessor had a hunting lodge at Mentmore, between the site of the present Mentmore Towers and the hamlet of Crafton at a site known as Berrystead. The well of this lodge is marked today by a wood still known as Prilow, derived from the Norman French pres l'ieu ("near the water").

In 1808 Magna Britannia reported:

MENTMORE, in the hundred of Cotslow and deanery of Muresley, lies about eight miles to the north-east of Aylesbury. The manor was anciently in the families of Bussel and Zouche: in 1490 it was granted to Sir Reginald Bray, from whom it descended, by a female heir, to the family of Sandys: in 1729, it was purchased with the manor of Leadbourne, by Lord Viscount Limerick, of a Mr. Legoe, who inherited them from the family of Wigg. They are now the property of Richard Bard Harcourt esq. who purchased them of Lord Limerick's son, James Earl of Clanbrassil. In the church are some memorials of the families of Theed and Wigg.
The impropriate rectory, which was given by the Bussells to the priory of St. Bartholomew, in Smithfield, is now the property of Mr. Harcourt, who is patron of the vicarage.

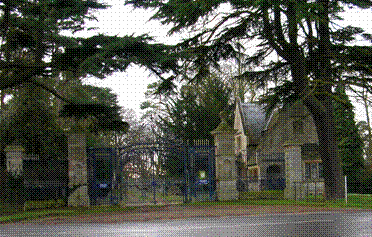
The entrance gates to Mentmore Towers, adjacent to the village green

The Church of England parish church of St Mary the Virgin dates from the 14th century. It contains monuments to the Wigg and Theed families and one to Neil Primrose. It is a simple structure of three aisles and a clerestory. It was heavily restored by the Rothschild family in the 19th century. The tower has a ring of five bells, which were restored in the mid-1990s.

The village manor house, built by the Wigg family as a 16th-century half timbered structure, was re-faced in redbrick, with a Georgian front extension in the mid-18th century. The Wiggs were lords of the manor from the 16th to 18th centuries.

The ownership eventually passed to the Harcourt or D'Harcourt families, until it was bought in 1850 from the trustees of three Harcourt sisters who had been left insolvent on the death of their father. The purchaser was Baron Mayer de Rothschild.

The Baron employed the leading architect Joseph Paxton to build a new mansion; the site chosen because of its fine elevation, was that of the village itself. The village – then in a dilapidates state – was demolished and rebuilt on its current site. The plan chosen for the new village was "Tudor meets Victorian" around a village green and mansion gates.

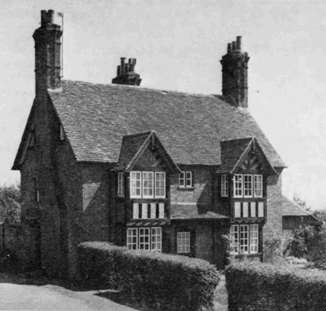
Two cottages at Mentmore designed to appear as one house, typical of those designed by George Devey for Hannah de Rothschild. Photographed circa 1968.

While Paxton and his son-in-law George Stokes worked on the mansion later to be known as Mentmore Towers, George Stokes also designed the first cottages for the new Mentmore. On the death of Baron Mayer in 1877 his heiress Hannah de Rothschild continued the building of the village using another architect George Devey (his work was a forerunner of the arts and crafts movement).These houses can be identified by the 'H de R' cypher on their gables. After her marriage to the 5th Earl of Rosebery the building continued with another architect John Aspell; his work appears similar to that of Devey, but has less refinement and is clearly of a cheaper construction. The old post office in the centre of a block of housing is clearly Devy's work, yet the houses adjoining are clearly of the lesser hand. The picturesque style Thatched or South Lodge is another of Devey's work, as is the former riding school with its stable yard – (now a housing complex).

The cottage orné style Old Dairy, designed by George Stokes in 1859, is a pastiche of the Hameau de la Reine at Versailles. While intended as a functioning dairy, its verandas were also designed as a setting for Baroness Mayer de Rothschild's afternoon tea parties. This is one of the last buildings still to be owned by the Rosebery Estate and was restored in 2007.

At this time Anglo Saxon remains were found near the site of the present front drive of Mentmore Towers. The drives to the mansion are the original public highways, which were re-routed at this time.

By 1880 the village and its new approach roads were more or less finished and looked much as they do today. The late 6th Earl of Rosebery who died in 1974 said that nothing had been built in Mentmore in his lifetime – largely true, although both he and his father had built stable blocks at the stud farms. The only buildings not owned by him were the church and the vicarage. The vicarage, a high gabled Victorian building built in the 1880s, was sold by the Church Commissioners in the 1960s and is now a private house.

In 1977, Towers, village and farms were put up for sale in their entirety. While the stable blocks are now housing, and executive style homes have been built, the village is still largely unchanged and retains much of its Victorian character.
