= Crafton (name) =

Crafton is both a surname and a given name. Notable people with the name include:

- Alton Crafton (born 1969), Saint Lucian cricketer
- Jason Crafton (born 1982), American basketball coach
- Matt Crafton (born 1976), American racing driver
