= Mayer Amschel de Rothschild =

English businessman and politician

Baron Mayer de Rothschild
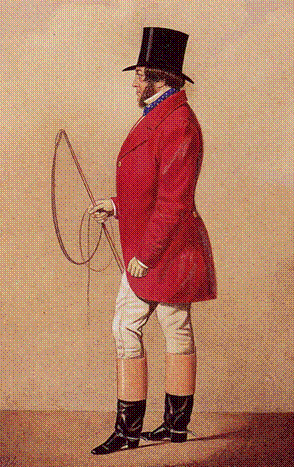
- Spy cartoon, 1874
- Born: 29 June 1818; London
- Died: 6 February 1874 (aged 55)
- Children: Hannah Primrose, Countess of Rosebery
- Parent: Nathan Mayer Rothschild
- Relatives: Mayer Amschel Rothschild, grandfather

Baron Mayer Amschel de Rothschild (29 June 1818 – 6 February 1874) was an English businessman and politician of the English branch of the Rothschild family. He was the fourth and youngest son of Hannah (Barent-Cohen) and Nathan Mayer Rothschild (1777–1836). He was named Mayer Amschel Rothschild, for his grandfather, the patriarch of the Rothschild family.

== Life ==
Known to his family as "Muffy", he was born in New Court, London. After studying at the University of Leipzig and Heidelberg University he became the first member of his family to receive an education at an English university, spending time at both Magdalene and Trinity College, Cambridge. Although apprenticed in the family's various banking houses in Europe, he never became a major part of the banking empire. He became High Sheriff of Buckinghamshire in 1847, and was elected Liberal MP for Hythe in 1859. In 1847 he served on the committee of the British Relief Association.

Mayer's mother, Hannah (née Barent Cohen) began the Rothschild acquisitions in Buckinghamshire. Thinking her sons unhealthy, she began to purchase parcels of land around Aylesbury in prime hunting country, where they could take outdoor exercise. By the middle of the 19th century, two of her four sons had large estates and mansions in the Vale of Aylesbury: Anthony Nathan de Rothschild at Aston Clinton; and Mayer at Mentmore. Mayer built Mentmore Towers, the most sumptuous of the English Rothschild houses at the time. Twenty years later, two of his nephews were to follow: Ferdinand James von Rothschild at Waddesdon and Alfred de Rothschild at Halton. Mayer’s brother, Lionel de Rothschild bought another nearby estate at Tring, which he gave as a belated wedding present to his son, Nathan Rothschild, 1st Baron Rothschild.

In 1873, Baron Mayer bought 90 acres (36 hectares) of land at Ascott, two miles from Mentmore. This was given to his nephew Leopold de Rothschild who enlarged the existing Ascott House to the Neo-Tudor structure seen today.

Mayer Rothschild was a keen horseback rider and hunter, in spite of his weight of 101 kilograms (223 lb) (just over 15 stones), and was a fan of thoroughbred horse racing. He established a stud farm at Crafton, Buckinghamshire, and was a member of the Jockey Club. In 1871, his horses won four of the five "classic" races: Favonius won The Derby and "Hannah" won The Oaks, the 1,000 Guineas and the St. Leger Stakes.

== Family ==
Mayer de Rothschild and his wife Juliana (née Cohen) had one child, a daughter, Hannah, later Countess of Rosebery. She was his sole heiress, and through her, Mentmore Towers passed to the Earl of Rosebery, who served as Prime Minister from 1894 to 1895.

Mayer Amschel de Rothschild died in 1874 and was buried in the Willesden Jewish Cemetery in Beaconsfield Road, Willesden, London.

== See also ==
- History of the Jews in England
- Rothschild banking family of England
- Rothschild banking family of France
- Rothschild banking family of Austria
- Rothschild banking family of Naples
- Carl Mayer von Rothschild

Parliament of the United Kingdom
Preceded by Sir John Ramsden, Bt	Member of Parliament for Hythe; 1859–1874	Succeeded by Sir Edward William Watkin
Honorary titles
Preceded by Sir William Clayton, Bt	High Sheriff of Buckinghamshire; 1847	Succeeded by William Lowndes
