= Château de Pregny =

Castle in Pregny-Chambésy, Switzerland

Coordinates: 46°14′07″N 6°08′30″E

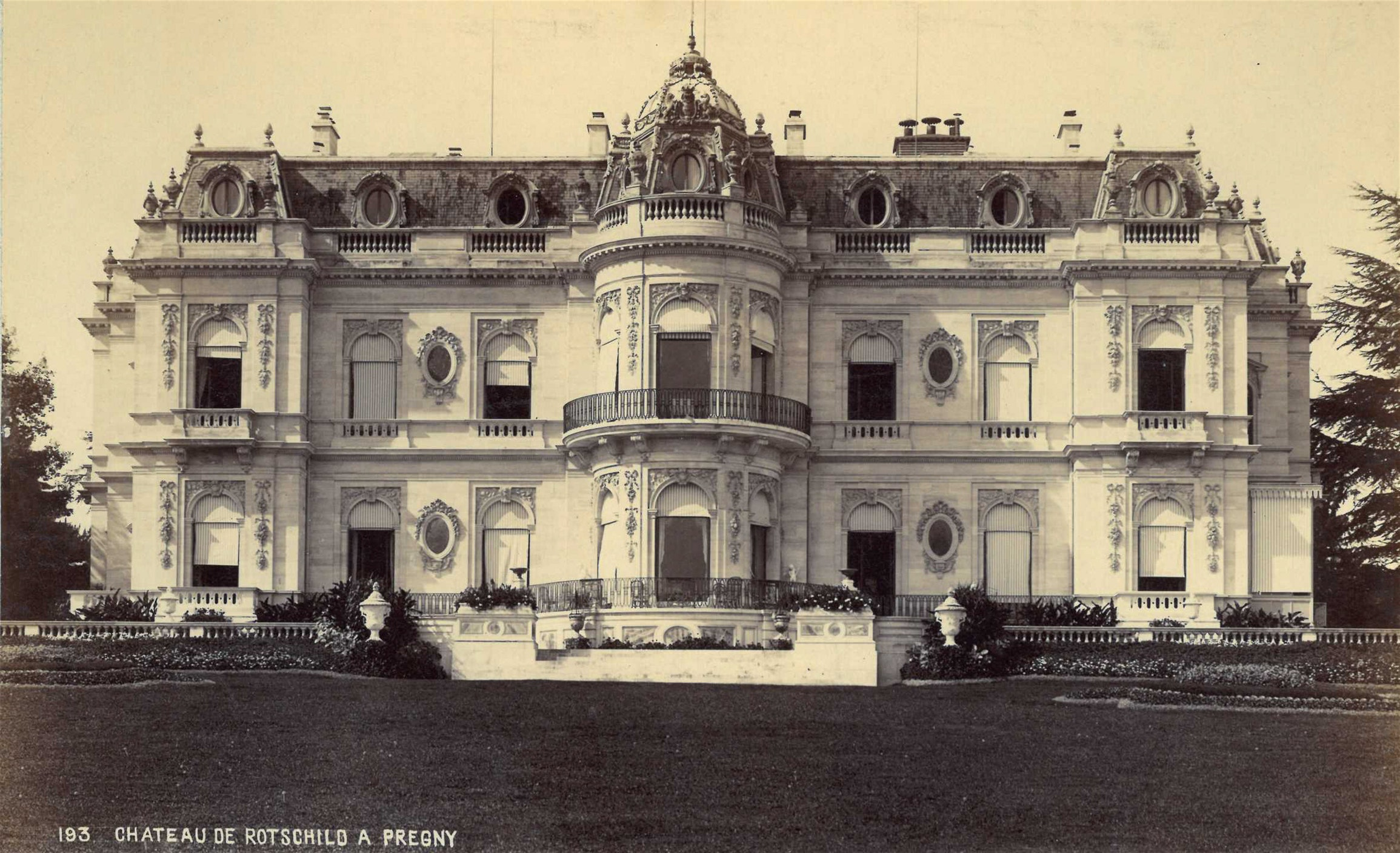
Old postcard of the Château de Pregny

The Château de Pregny, sometimes referred to as the Rothschild Castle, is a castle in the municipality of Pregny-Chambésy of the Canton of Geneva in Switzerland. It is a Swiss heritage site of national significance.

== History ==
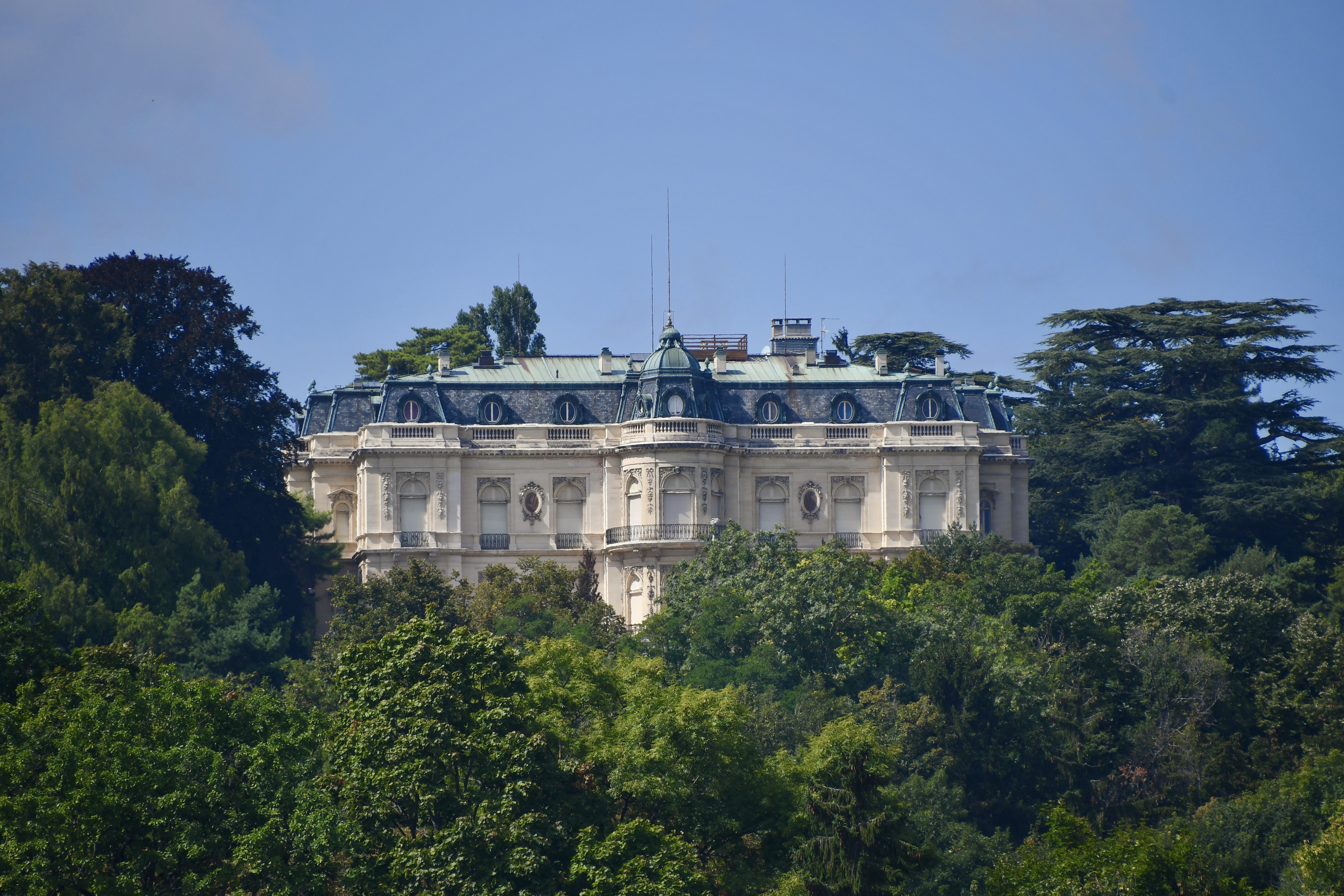
The château, 2021

The château was built in 1858 by the Swiss banker, Adolphe Carl de Rothschild, who died childless in 1900. He bequeathed to a cousin, Maurice de Rothschild of the Rothschild banking family of France, who in turn left it to his son, Edmond Adolphe de Rothschild.

During World War II, Château de Pregny escaped the Nazi looting that befell many other Rothschild properties across Europe.

Maurice de Rothschild bequeathed his estate to the State of Geneva upon his death in 1957, retaining a right of usufruct for the Rothschild family. The chateau was then occupied by his son, Edmond de Rothschild, and his wife, Nadine. From 2017 to 2021, the chateau was inhabited by Benjamin de Rothschild and his wife, Ariane, and then, following his death, solely by the latter.

== See also ==
- List of castles in Switzerland
