= Crafton, Buckinghamshire =

Hamlet in Buckinghamshire, England

Coordinates: 51.869°N 0.710°W

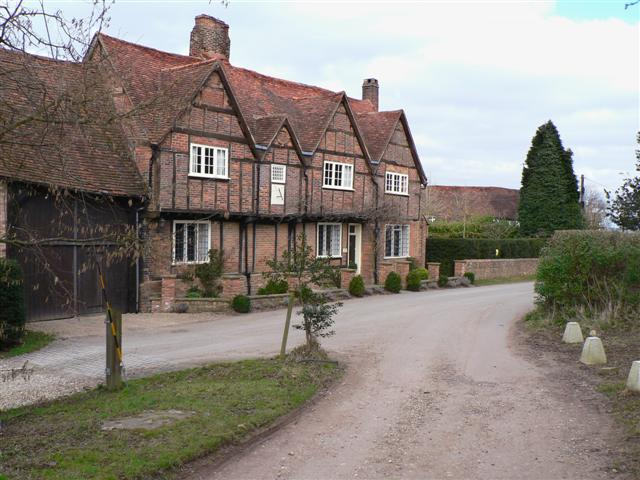
Crafton Farmhouse, 2006

Crafton is a hamlet in the civil parish of Mentmore, in Buckinghamshire, England.

The hamlet's name is Anglo Saxon in origin, and means 'farm where saffron grows'. Edith of Wessex, a queen of England, had a hunting lodge in the small area between Mentmore and Crafton known as Berrystead. The remains of the Lodge, converted in the 15th century to a farmhouse, were demolished when Mentmore Towers was under construction in the mid 19th century.

The hamlet while in the ecclesiastic parish of Wing, is nearer to Wingrave. It is however under the jurisdiction the parish council of Mentmore. There are two 16th-century farmhouses, one of which (known as Hellesthorpe) has the unusual distinction of having a Crafton postal address, but is in the parish of Wingrave. Many residents of the hamlet are equally confused by their parish's whereabouts, most have chosen to worship and be buried at Mentmore, the village most socially connected to Crafton.

Crafton once had a small Methodist chapel; this is now a private house.

The remainder of the settlement comprises small terraced 18th century cottages. However the hamlet was substantially rebuilt after the 1850s when it became part of the Mentmore estate of Baron Mayer de Rothschild.

In addition to building some cottages the Baron built his famed Crafton Stud farm in the hamlet. In the short space of ten years following its creation the stud farm bred two Epsom Derby winners for the Baron. These were Ladas and Sir Visto.

One of the most attractive buildings in the hamlet is Keeper's Cottage, originally the home of the head game-keeper it also served as the lodge to the Crafton drive of Mentmore Towers.

The hamlet is reached only by one small cul-de-sac road. It contains no public house or shop.
