= George Henry Stokes (architect) =

English architect (1826–1876)

George Henry Stokes (1826–1876) was an English architect.

After being a pupil in the joint firm of George Gilbert Scott and William Bonython Moffatt from 1843 to 1847, he became an assistant to Joseph Paxton on projects such as Lismore Castle and the Rothschild family properties of Mentmore Towers and the château de Pregny. He married Paxton's daughter Emily in 1853 and Paxton also passed the commission for Battlesden Park on to him in 1860.

He retired from practice after Paxton's death in 1865 due to ill health, even withdrawing his entry to design St Pancras Station and handing his part in Aston Clinton (another Rothschild project) on to George Devey. He is buried in the graveyard at Edensor.
