= Cicero (horse) =

British Thoroughbred racehorse

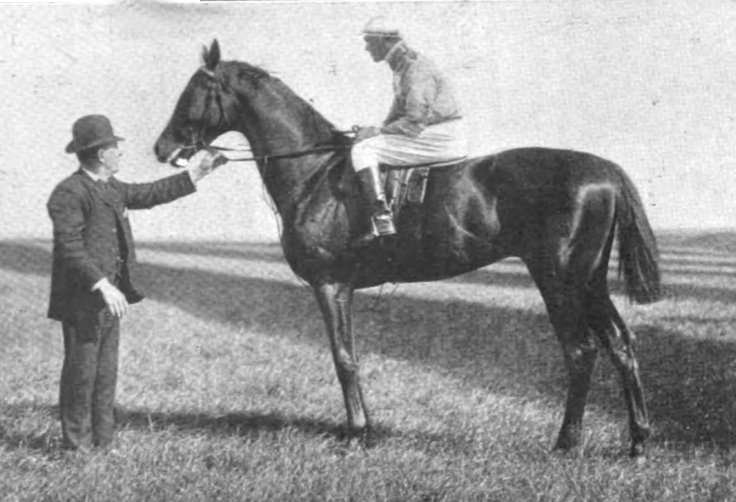
- Cicero in a photograph by W.A. Rouch.
- Sire: Cyllene
- Grandsire: Bona Vista
- Dam: Gas
- Damsire: Ayrshire
- Sex: Stallion
- Foaled: 1902
- Country: United Kingdom of Great Britain and Ireland
- Colour: Chestnut
- Breeder: Archibald Primrose, 5th Earl of Rosebery
- Owner: Archibald Primrose, 5th Earl of Rosebery
- Trainer: Percy Peck
- Record: 10: 8-1-0
- Earnings: £17,750

Major wins
- Woodcote Stakes (1904); Coventry Stakes (1904); July Stakes (1904); Epsom Derby (1905)

Cicero (1902–1923) was a British Thoroughbred racehorse and sire. He was the best English two-year-old of 1904, winning all five of his races. In 1905 Cicero became one of the shortest priced successful favourites in the history of the Derby, winning at 4/11 to remain undefeated. He won only once from his remaining three races before retiring to a modestly successful career at stud.

== Background ==
Cicero, a small chestnut colt, was bred by his owner Lord Rosebery, the former Prime Minister, at his stud at The Durdans, near Epsom. He was sired by Cyllene, an Ascot Gold Cup winner, who went on to become a highly successful stallion. In addition to Cicero, he sired three other winners of The Derby and through his grandson, Phalaris, he is the direct male-line ancestor of most modern thoroughbreds. His dam, Gas, a filly also bred by Lord Rosebery, was a half-sister of the Derby winner Ladas and proved to be an influential broodmare: her descendants included the classic winners Vaucluse (1915 1000 Guineas), Happy Laughter (1000 Guineas) and Shirley Heights (1978 Epsom Derby).

Cicero was sent into training with Percy Peck at Harraton Court, Exning, near Newmarket, Suffolk. In training, Cicero was a lively, high-spirited type who could be seen bucking and kicking at exercise. One writer commented that he "doubtless takes something out of himself with his vagaries, but then there is such a lot to take!"

== Racing career ==
=== 1904: two-year-old season ===
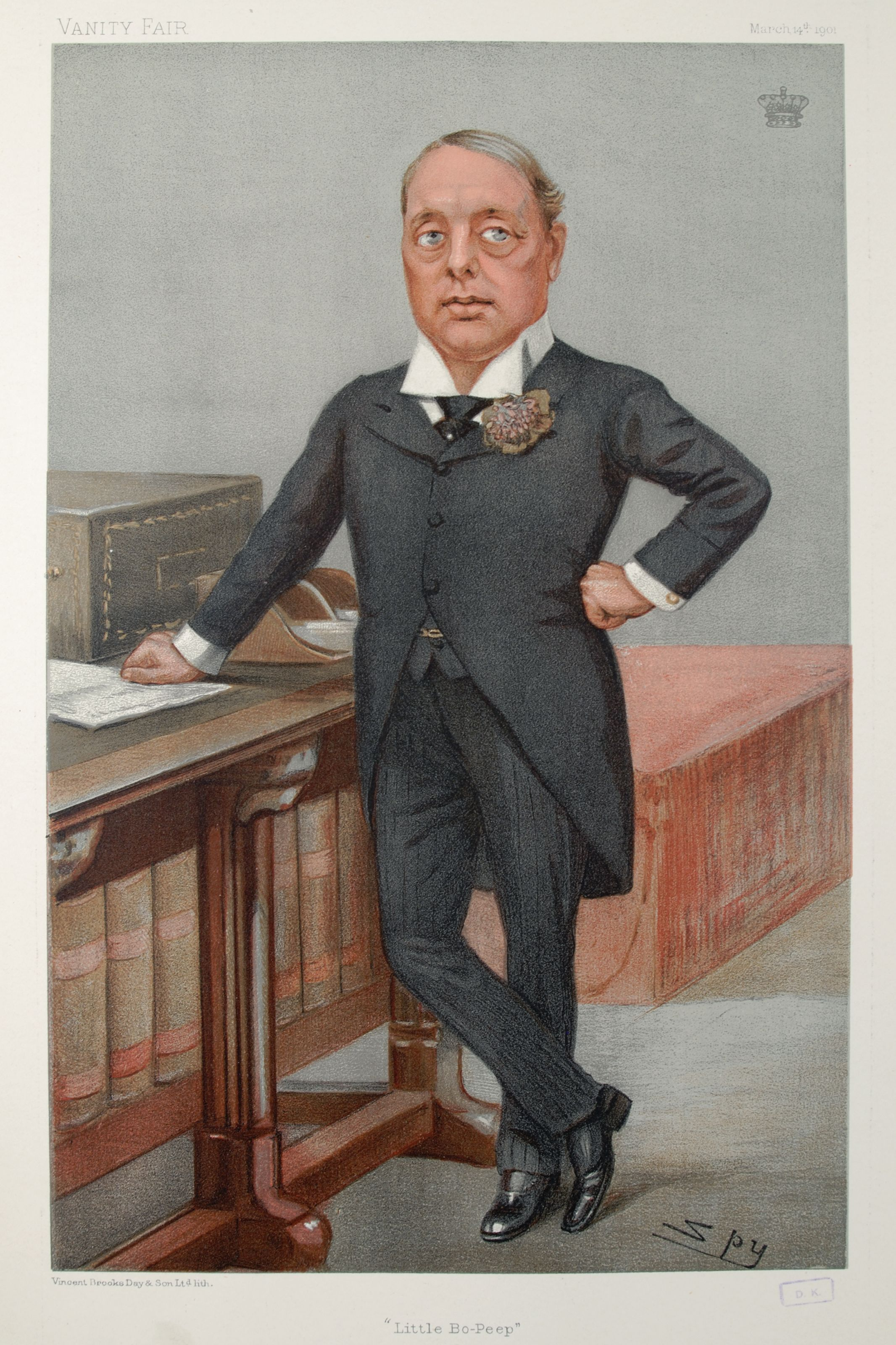
Lord Rosebery, who bred and owned Cicero

Cicero was unbeaten in five races as a two-year-old. At the Craven meeting at Newmarket in April he won the Fitzwilliam Stakes, beating the King's, horse Rosemarket who started favourite. Cicero beat Rosemarket again in the Woodcote Stakes at Epsom in June, this time as the even money favourite. He was then sent to Royal Ascot where he won the Coventry Stakes at Royal Ascot beating Vedas by two lengths. He won the July Stakes at Newmarket at the unusual odds of 1/20 and then carried 135lbs to victory in the valuable National Breeder's Produce Stakes at Sandown in mid July. He sustained an injury in the Sandown race and missed the rest of the season, but nevertheless went into the winter break as favourite for the Derby.

=== 1905: three-year-old season ===
Cicero had not been entered in the 2000 Guineas, which was won by Vedas and instead made his debut in the Newmarket Stakes. He won easily from Llangibby and was made favourite for the Derby. Vedas was ruled out of the Derby by injury and at Epsom Cicero was sent off at odds of 4/11, making him one of the shortest-priced favourites in the race's history. The second favourite was the French-trained Jardy, who was also undefeated, but reportedly suffering from a respiratory infection which had affected many of the horses in the stables of his owner, Edmond Blanc. Ridden by Danny Maher Cicero tracked the leaders in the early stages before making his challenge in the straight. Unable to find a run along the rails, Maher switched Cicero to the outside and took the lead only to be faced by the "strenuous challenges" of Jardy and Signorino. He ran on strongly under pressure to win after a "bitter struggle" by three quarters of a length from Jardy with Signorino a head further back in third. The winning time of 2:39.6 was a new race record.

Lord Rosebery celebrated the victory in extravagant style with a firework display at The Durdans, followed by a “lavish treat” for the four hundred inmates of the local workhouse and a garden party for three-thousand local "working men".

On his next start Cicero attempted to defend his unbeaten record in the Eclipse Stakes at Sandown for which he started 8/13 favourite. His main rival was expected to be Val d'Or, a stable companion of Jardy and the winner of the Poule d'Essai des Poulains. Cicero took up the lead in the straight and was immediately challenged by the French colt. Maher rode a vigorous finish, but Val d'Or, who was receiving three pounds from Cicero, pulled ahead in the closing stages to win by a half a length.

Cicero then developed leg problems and, although considered as a contender for the St Leger he did not appear on the racecourse for the rest of the year.

=== 1906: four-year-old season ===
On his four-year-old debut on 20 April 1906, Cicero carried 140 lbs to beat Shilfa, his only opponent, in the one and a half mile Biennial Stakes at Newmarket, recording a time of 2:32.8. He was then aimed at the Ascot Gold Cup, for which he started second favourite, but after racing in second, he faded badly and finished unplaced behind Bachelor's Button and Pretty Polly.

On the advice of his trainer, Cicero was then retired.

== Assessment ==
During his racing career, there was some disagreement about Cicero's merits: some considered him a "really great horse", while others felt that he was merely "the best of a moderate lot" of English colts.

In their book A Century of Champions, John Randall and Tony Morris rated Cicero an “average” Derby winner.

== Stud career ==
Cicero stood as a stallion at his owner's studs at Mentmore, Buckinghamshire. He was a modest success, with his best offspring being the Prince of Wales's Stakes winner Friar Marcus. In 1921 his stud fee was 200 guineas. In 1923 he was retired from stud duties and moved back to his birthplace, The Durdans. Shortly after his arrival, however, Cicero had to be euthanized after suffering an intestinal rupture when cast in his box. He was buried at The Durdans.

== Pedigree ==
Pedigree of Cicero (GB), chestnut stallion, 1902
Sire Cyllene (GB) 1895	Bona Vista (GB); 1889	Bend Or	Doncaster
Sire Cyllene (GB) 1895	Bona Vista (GB); 1889	Bend Or	Rouge Rose
Sire Cyllene (GB) 1895	Bona Vista (GB); 1889	Vista	Macaroni
Sire Cyllene (GB) 1895	Bona Vista (GB); 1889	Vista	Verdure
Sire Cyllene (GB) 1895	Arcadia (GB); 1887	Isonomy	Sterling
Sire Cyllene (GB) 1895	Arcadia (GB); 1887	Isonomy	Isola Bella
Sire Cyllene (GB) 1895	Arcadia (GB); 1887	Distant Shore	Hermit
Sire Cyllene (GB) 1895	Arcadia (GB); 1887	Distant Shore	Lands End
Dam Gas (GB) 1892	Ayrshire (GB); 1885	Hampton	Lord Clifden
Dam Gas (GB) 1892	Ayrshire (GB); 1885	Hampton	Lady Langden
Dam Gas (GB) 1892	Ayrshire (GB); 1885	Atalanta	Galopin
Dam Gas (GB) 1892	Ayrshire (GB); 1885	Atalanta	Feronia
Dam Gas (GB) 1892	Illuminata (GB); 1877	Rosicrucian	Beadsman
Dam Gas (GB) 1892	Illuminata (GB); 1877	Rosicrucian	Madame Eglentine
Dam Gas (GB) 1892	Illuminata (GB); 1877	Paraffin	Blair Athol
Dam Gas (GB) 1892	Illuminata (GB); 1877	Paraffin	Paradigm (Family: 1-l)

== See also ==
- List of racehorses
