= Crafton, Virginia =

Unincorporated community in Virginia, United States

Coordinates: 37°55′11″N 78°17′42″W

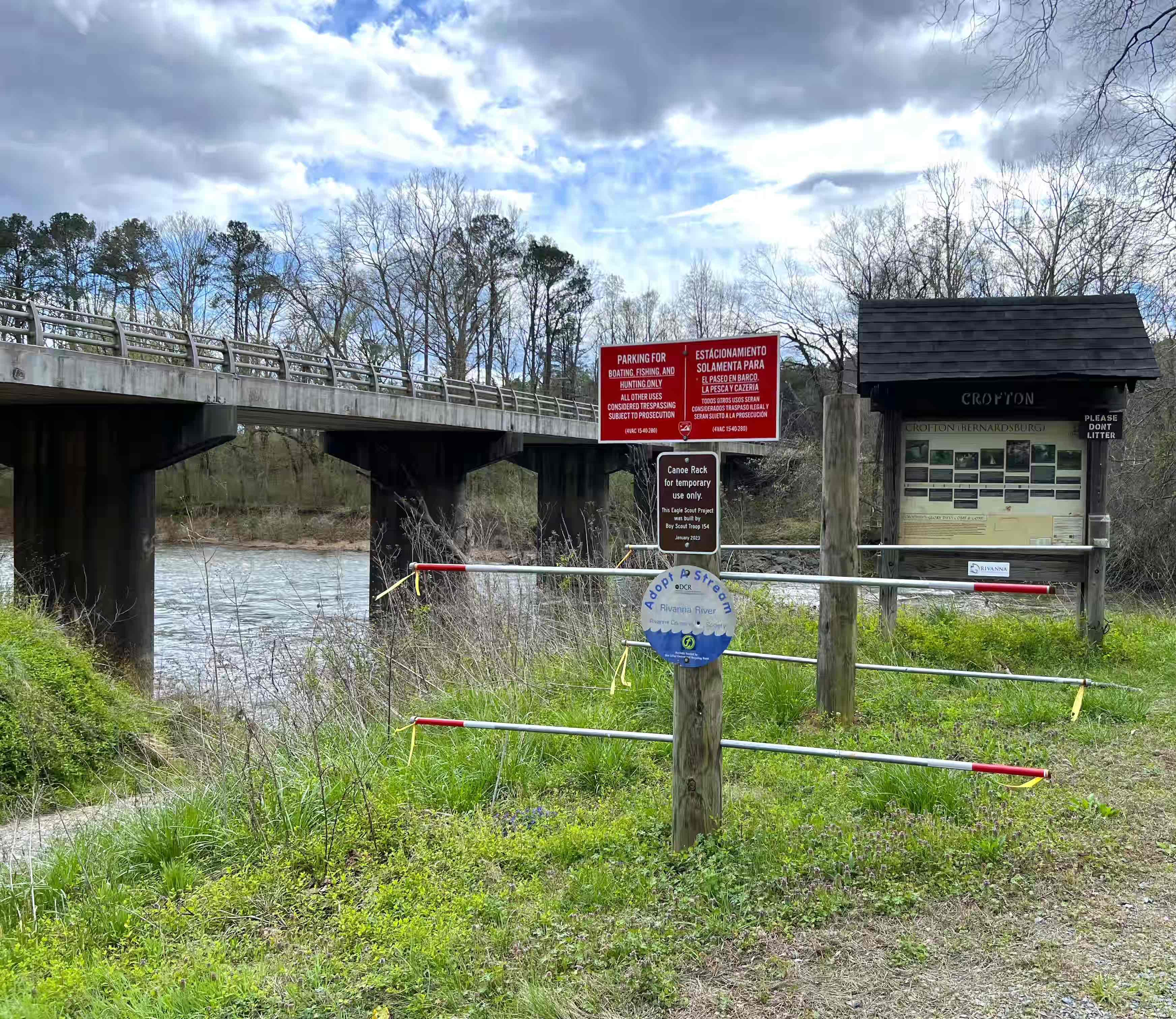
Boat launch point in Crafton for the Rivanna River.

Crafton is an unincorporated community in Fluvanna County, in the U.S. state of Virginia.
